= National pavilions at the Venice Biennale =

National representation at the Venice Biennale

Coordinates: 45.429°N 12.358°E

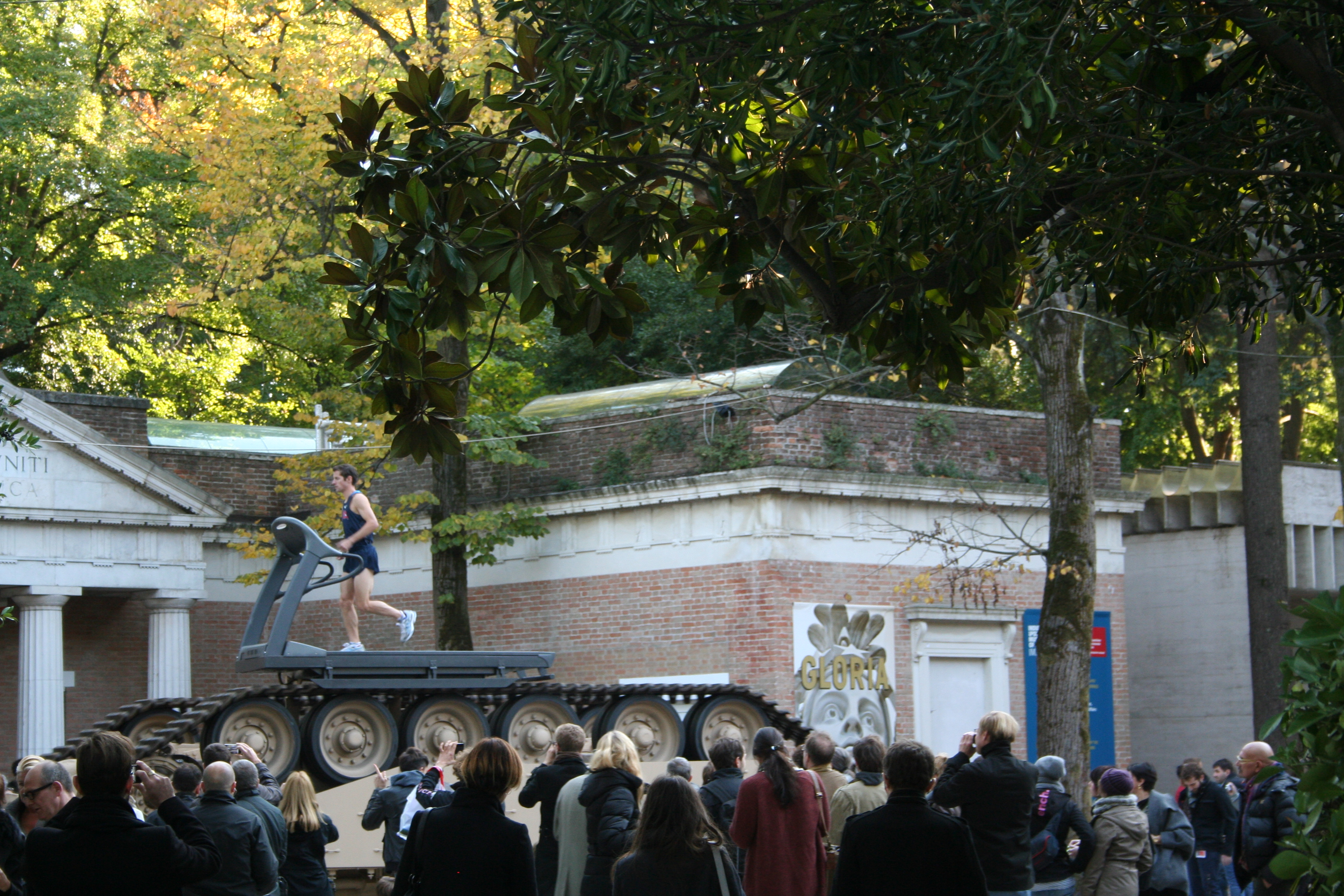
Crowds near the United States pavilion in 2011

The national pavilions host each participating nation's official representation at the Venice Biennale, an international art biennial exhibition held in Venice, Italy. Some countries own pavilion buildings in the Giardini della Biennale, while others rent buildings throughout the city; however, each country controls its own selection process and production costs.

== Background ==
The Venice Biennale is an international art biennial exhibition held in Venice, Italy. Often described as "the Olympics of the art world", participation in the Biennale is a prestigious event for contemporary artists. The festival has become a constellation of shows: a central exhibition curated by that year's artistic director, national pavilions hosted by individual nations, and independent exhibitions held throughout Venice. The Biennale's parent organisation also runs regular festivals in other arts: architecture, dance, film, music and theatre.

Outside the central international exhibition, individual nations produce their own shows, known as pavilions, as their national representation. Nations that own their pavilion buildings – such as the 30 housed in the Giardini – are responsible for their own upkeep and construction costs as well. Nations without dedicated buildings create pavilions in venues throughout the city.

== Giardini national pavilions ==
Nation	Location	First exhibition	Year of construction
Austria	Giardini		1934
Australia	Giardini		1988
Belgium	Giardini		1907
Brazil	Giardini		1964
Canada	Giardini		1957
Central Pavilion	Giardini		1895
Czech Republic and Slovakia	Giardini		1926
Denmark	Giardini		1932
Egypt	Giardini		1932
Estonia	Giardini		1997
Finland	Giardini		1956
France	Giardini		1912
Germany	Giardini		1909
Great Britain	Giardini		1909
Greece	Giardini		1934
Hungary	Giardini		1909
Israel	Giardini		1952
Japan	Giardini		1956
the Netherlands	Giardini		1912
Nordic countries (Sweden/Norway/Finland)	Giardini		1962
Poland	Giardini		1932
Romania	Giardini		1938
Russia	Giardini		1914
Serbia	Giardini		1938
South Korea	Giardini		1995
Spain	Giardini		1922
Switzerland	Giardini		1952
United States	Giardini		1930
Uruguay	Giardini		1962
Venezuela	Giardini		1956
Venice	Giardini		1932

=== Qatar ===
In 2024, the Venice Biennale announced a proposal for a Qatar pavilion in the Giardini as part of a deal between the city of Venice and the Qatar Museums, which will manage the pavilion. Following an international competition, an advisory panel chaired by Rem Koolhaas selected Lina Ghotmeh as the architect to create the permanent pavilion in 2025.

== Pavilions outside Giardini ==
=== Albania ===
List of exhibitors in the Albanian Pavilion:

- 1999 — Alban Hajdinaj, Besnik & Flutura Haxhillari, Edi Hila, Lala Meredith-Vula, Gazmend Muka, Adrian Paci, Edi Rama, Anri Sala, Astrit Vatnikaj, Sislej Xhafa. (Curator: Edi Muka)
- 2005 — Sislej Xhafa. (Commissioner and Curator: Andi Tepelena and Cecilia Tirelli)
- 2007 — Helidon Gjergji, Genti Gjokola, Alban Hajdinaj, Armando Lulaj, Heldi Pema. (Commissioner: Rubens Shima. Curator: Bonnie Clearwater)
- 2009 — Anila Rubiku, Orion Shima, Gentian Shkurti, Eltjon Valle, Driant Zeneli. (Commissioner: Parid Tefereçi. Curator: Riccardo Caldura)
- 2015 — Armando Lulaj. (Curator: Marco Scotini)
- 2017 — Leonard Qylafi. (Curator: Vanessa Joan Müller)
- 2024 — Iva Lulashi (Curator:Antonio Grulli)

=== Andorra ===
List of exhibitors in the Andorran Pavilion:

- 2011 - Helena Guàrdia, Francisco Sánchez
- 2013 - Javier Balmaseda, Samantha Bosque and Fiona Morrisson
- 2015 - Agustí Roqué, Joan Xandri
- 2017 - Eve Ariza

=== Argentina ===
In 1901, Argentina was the first Latin American nation to participate in the Biennale. In 2011, it was granted a pavilion in the Sale d'Armi, which it will restore.

List of exhibitors in the Argentine Pavilion:

- 1903 — Pío Collivadino
- 1905 — Pío Collivadino
- 1907 — Pío Collivadino
- 1954 — Lucio Fontana
- 1956 — Sarah Grilo
- 1958 — Lucio Fontana, Juan del Prete, Raquel Forner
- 1962 — Antonio Berni
- 1966 — Lucio Fontana, Julio Le Parc
- 1968 — Lucio Fontana
- 1970 — Luis Fernando Benedit
- 1972 — Lucio Fontana
- 1978 — Lucio Fontana
- 1980 — Sergio de Castro, Fabriciano
- 1982 — Marino di Teana
- 1984 — Antonio Seguí
- 1986 — Marta Minujin
- 1995 — Jorge Orta
- 1997 — Ana Eckell
- 1999 — Jaques Bedel, Luis Benedit, Oscar Bony
- 2001 — Leandro Erlich, Graciela Sacco (Curator: Irma Arestizábal)
- 2003 — Charly Nijensohn
- 2005 — Jorge Macchi, Edgardo Rudnitzky
- 2007 — Guillermo Kuitca, Jorge Macchi, Edgardo Rudnitzky (Commissioner: Adriana Rosenberg)
- 2009 — Luis Felipe Noé (Curator: Fabián Lebenglik)
- 2011 — Adrián Villar Rojas (Curator: Rodrigo Alonso)
- 2013 — Nicola Costantino (Curator: Fernando Farina)
- 2015 — Juan Carlos Distéfano (Curator: María Teresa Constantín)
- 2017 — Claudia Fontes (Curator: Christine Macel)
- 2019 — Mariana Telleria (Curator: Florencia Battiti)
- 2022 — Mónica Heller (Curator: Alejo Ponce de León)
- 2024 — Luciana Lamothe (Curator: Sofía Dourron)

=== Bahrain ===
- 2013 — Waheeda Malullah

=== Benin ===
List of exhibitors in the Beninese Pavilion:

- 2024 – Ishola Akpo, Mofouli Bello, Romuald Hazoumé, Chloé Quenum (Curator: Azu Nwagbogu)

=== Bosnia and Herzegovina ===
List of exhibitors in the Bosnian Pavilion:

- 2003 — Maja Bajevic, Jusuf Hadžifejzovic, Edin Numankadic, Nebojša Šeric-Šoba
- 2013 — Mlаden Miljаnović
- 2017 — Radenko Milak (Curators : Christopher Yggdre, Sinziana Ravini, Fredrik Svensk, Anna van der Vliet)
- 2019 — Danica Dakić (Curators: Anja Bogojević, Amila Puzić, Claudia Zini)

=== Central Asia ===
The first Central Asian Pavilion was an initiative of Victor Miziano in 2005. The second pavilion was organized by Yulia Sorokina (Almaty) and the third by Beral Madra (Istanbul). Each of these was different in format and approach. The first one – Art from Central Asia. A Contemporary Archive – aimed at placing Central Asia on the 'map' of international art. Along the works of invited artists, there were many video compilations of films, performance and happenings presented by Central Asian artists from the end of the 1990s and beginning of 2000.

List of exhibitors in the Central Asia Pavilion:

- 2005 — Said Atabekov, Vyacheslav Akhunov & Sergey Tychina, Maksim Boronilov & Roman Maskalev, Elena Vorobyeva & Viktor Vorobyev, Kasmalieva & Djumaliev, Sergey Maslov, Almagul Menlibaeva, Erbossyn Meldibekov, Alexander Nikolaev, Rustam Khalfin & Yulia Tikhonova (Curators: Viktor Misiano, Commissioner: Churek Djamgerchinova)
- 2007 — Roman Maskalev, Almagul Menlibaeva & German Popov, Gulnur Mukazhanova, Alexander Nikolaev, Aleksey Rumyantsev, Alexander Ugay, Asia Animation, Said Atabekov, Vyacheslav Akhunov, Alla Girik & Oksana Shatalova, Digsys, Natalia Dyu, Zadarnovsky Brothers, Gaukhar Kiyekbayeva, Vyacheslav Useinov, Jamol Usmanov, Aytegin Muratbek Uulu, Jamshed Kholikov, ZITABL (Commissioner and curator: Yulia Sorokina)
- 2009 — Ermek Jaenish, Jamshed Kholikov, Anzor Salidjanov, Oksana Shatalova, Elena Vorobyeva & Viktor Vorobyev (Curator: Beral Madra, Commissioner: Vittorio Urbani)
- 2011 — Natalia Andrianova, Said Atabekov, Artyom Ernst, Galim Madanov and Zauresh Terekbay, Yerbossyn Meldibekov, Alexander Nikolaev, Marat Raiymkulov, Aleksey Rumyantsev and Alla Rumyantseva, Adis Seitaliev (Curators: Boris Chukhovich, Georgy Mamedov, Oksana Shatalova, Commissioners: Asel Akmatova, Andris Brinkmanis)

=== Chile ===
List of exhibitors in the Chilean Pavilion:

- 2009 — Iván Navarro (Curators: Antonio Arévalo, Justo Pastor Mellado)
- 2011 — Fernando Prats (Curator: Fernando Castro Flórez)
- 2013 — Alfredo Jaar (Curator: Madeleine Grynsztejn)
- 2015 — Paz Errázuriz, Lotty Rosenfeld (Curator: Nelly Richard)
- 2017 — Bernardo Oyarzún (Curator: Ticio Escobar)
- 2024 – Valeria Montti (Curator: Andrea Pacheco)

=== Croatia ===
List of exhibitors in the Croatian Pavilion:

- 1993 — Milivoj Bijelić, Ivo Deković, and Željko Kipke
- 1995 — Martina Kramer, Goran Petercol, Mirko Zrinščak, Ivan Faktor, Nina Ivančić, Damir Sokić, Mladen Stilinović, Dean Jokanović Toumin, Goran Trbuljak, Gorki Žanić
- 1997 — Dalibor Martinis
- 1999 — Zlatan Vrkljan
- 2001 — Julije Knifer
- 2003 — Boris Cvjetanović and Ana Opalić
- 2007 — Ivana Franke (curator: Branko Franceschi, Željko Kipke)
- 2011 — Saša Begović, Marko Dabrović, Igor Franić, Tanja Grozdanić, Petar Mišković, Silvije Novak, Veljko Oluić, Helena Paver Njirić, Lea Pelivan, Toma Plejić, Goran Rako, Saša Randić, Turato Idis, Pero Vuković e Tonči Žarnić
- 2013 — Kata Mijatović (Curator: Branko Franceschi)
- 2015 — Damir Očko (Curator: Marc Bembekoff)
- 2017 — Tina Gverović, Marko Tadić (Curator: Branka Benčić)
- 2019 — Igor Grubić (Curator: Katerina Gregos)

=== Cyprus ===
- 2026 — Marina Xenofontos (Curator: Kyle Dancewicz)

=== Estonia ===
The expositions at the Estonian pavilion are regularly commissioned by the Estonian Centre for Contemporary Art.

List of exhibitors in the Estonian pavilion:

- 2003 — Kaido Ole
- 2005 — Mark Raidpere (Curator: Hanno Soans)
- 2007 — Marko Mäetamm (Curator: Mika Hannula)
- 2009 — Kristina Norman (Curator: Marko Laimre)
- 2011 — Liina Siib
- 2013 — Dénes Farkas
- 2015 — Jaanus Samma (Curator: Eugenio Viola)
- 2017 — Katja Novitskova (Curator: Kati Ilves)
- 2019 — Kris Lemsalu
- 2022 — Kristina Norman, Bita Razavi, Emilie Rosalie Saal (Curator: Corina L. Apostol)

=== Gabon ===
Gabon first participated in the Venice Biennale in 2009.

List of exhibitors in the Gabonese Pavilion:

- 2009 — Owanto (Curator: Fernando Frances)

=== Georgia ===
List of exhibitors in the Georgian Pavilion:

- 2009 — Koka Ramishvili (Curator: Khatuna Khabuliani)
- 2013 — Bouillon Group, Thea Djordjadze, Nikoloz Lutidze, Gela Patashuri with Ei Arakawa and Sergei Tcherepnin, Gio Sumbadze (Commissioner: Marine Mizandari, curator: Joanna Warsza)
- 2015 — Rusudan Khizanishvili, Irakli Bluishvili, Dimitri Chikvaidze, Joseph Sabia, Ia Liparteliani, Nia Mgaloblishvili, Sophio Shevardnadze (Curator: Nia Mgaloblishvili)
- 2017 — Vajiko Chachkhiani (Curator: Julian Heynen)
- 2019 — Anna K.E. (Curator: Margot Norton)

=== Ghana ===
In 2019, Ghana will officially participate in the Venice Biennale for the first time.

List of exhibitors in the Ghanaian Pavilion:

- 2019 — El Anatsui, Ibrahim Mahama, Felicia Abban, Lynette Yiadom-Boakye, John Akomfrah, Selasi Awusi Sosu (Curator: Nana Oforiatta Ayim)

=== Grenada ===
In 2017, Grenada participated in the Venice Biennale at an exclusive space in Zattere, Dorsoduro, all allocated for the exhibition entitled The Bridge, where international artists from nations with sea outlets explored the collective idea of "own identity".

- 2017 — Alexandre Murucci, Khaled Hafez, Jason de Caires Taylor, Asher Mains, Milton Williams, Rashid bin Khalifa Al Khalifa, Zena Assi, and Mahmoud Obaidi (Curator: Omar Donia)

=== Hong Kong ===
List of exhibitors in the Hong Kong Pavilion:

- 2009 — Pak Sheung Chuen (Curator: Tobias Berger)
- 2011 — Kwok Mang Ho (known as Frog King)
- 2013 — Lee Kit (Curators: Lars Nittve, Yung Ma)
- 2015 — Tsang Kin-wah (Curators: Doryun Chong, Stella Fong)
- 2017 — Samson Young (Curator: Ying Kwok)
- 2019 — Shirley Tse (Curator: Christina Li)
- 2022 — Angela Su (Curator: Freya Chou)

=== Holy See ===
- 2013 — Studio Azzurro, Lawrence Carroll, Josef Koudelka
- 2015 — Monika Bravo, Elpida Hadzi-Vasileva, Mário Macilau (Curator: Micol Forti)
- 2024 — Maurizio Cattelan, Claire Fontaine, Simone Fattal, Claire Tabouret, Marco Perego

=== Iceland ===
In 1984, as Finland had joined Norway and Sweden in the Nordic Pavilion, Iceland was given the opportunity to rent the Finnish pavilion until 2006. The Icelandic Art Center commissions the Icelandic Pavilion at the Venice Biennale.

List of exhibitors in the Icelandish Pavilion:

- 1960 — Jóhannes Sveinsson Kjarval, Ásmundur Sveinsson
- 1972 — Svavar Guðnason, Þorvaldur Skúlason
- 1980 — Magnús Pálsson
- 1982 — Jón Gunnar Árnason, Kristján Guðmundsson
- 1984 — Kristján Davidsson
- 1986 — Erró
- 1988 — Gunnar Örn
- 1990 — Helgi Þorgils Friðjónsson
- 1995 — Birgir Andrésson
- 1997 — Steina Vasulka
- 1999 — Sigurður Árni Sigurðsson
- 2001 — Finnbogi Pétursson
- 2003 — Rúrí
- 2005 — Gabríela Friðriksdóttir
- 2007 — Steingrímur Eyfjörð (Curator: Hanna Styrmisdóttir)
- 2009 — Ragnar Kjartansson (Curators: Markús Thór Andrésson, Dorothée Kirch)
- 2011 — Libia Castro & Ólafur Ólafsson (Curator: Ellen Blumenstein)
- 2013 — Katrín Sigurðardóttir (Curators: Mary Ceruti, Ilaria Bonacossa)
- 2015 — Christoph Büchel (Curator: Nína Magnúsdóttir)
- 2017 — Egill Sæbjörnsson (Curator: Stefanie Böttcher)
- 2019 – Shoplifter - born Hrafnhildur Arnardóttir (Curator: Birta Gudjónsdóttir)

=== India ===
In 2011, India was represented for the first time after 116 years, with the support of the culture ministry and the organizational participation of the Lalit Kala Akademi. Biennale organizers had reportedly invited the country in past years, but the government had declined, a decision attributed to a lack of communication between the culture ministry and the country's National Gallery of Modern Art.

- 2011 – Mriganka Madhukaliya, Sonal Jain, Zarina Hashmi, Gigi Scaria, Praneet Soi (Curator: Ranjit Hoskote)
- 2015 – Shilpa Gupta, Rashid Rana (Exhibition jointly held with Pakistan)
- 2019 – Nandalal Bose, Atul Dodiya, Rummana Hussain, GR Iranna, Jitish Kallat, Shakuntala Kulkarni, Ashim Purkayastha

=== Indonesia ===
List of exhibitors in the Indonesian Pavilion:

- 2003 – Arahmaiani, Dadang Christanto, Tisna Sanjaya, Made Wianta (Curator: Amir Sidharta)
- 2005 – Krisna Murti, Noor Ibrahim, Entang Wiharso, and Yani Mariani Sastranegara (Curator: Dwi Marianto)
- 2013 – Albert Yonathan Setyawan, Sri Astari, Eko Nugroho, Entang Wiharso, and Titarubi (Curators: Carla Bianpoen and Rifky Effendy)
- 2015 – Heri Dono (Curators: Carla Bianpoen, Restu Imansari Kusumaningrum, and Asmudjo Jono Irianto)
- 2017 – Tintin Wulia (Curator: Agung Hujatnikajennong)
- 2019 – Handiwirman Saputra and Syagini Ratna Wulan (Curator: Asmudjo Jono Irianto)

=== Iran ===
- 1958 - Sirak Melkonian, Parviz Tanavoli, Monir Shahroudy Farmanfarmaian
- 2003 - Behrouz Daresh, Hossein KhoroJerdi, and Ahmad Nadalian
- 2015 - Furat al Jamil (b. 1965), Lida Abdul, Bani Abidi, Adel Abidin, Amin Agheai, Ghodratollah Agheli, Shahriar Ahmadi, Parastou Ahovan, Farhad Ahrarnia, Rashad Alakbarov, Nazgol Ansarinia, Reza Aramesh, Alireza Astaneh, Sonia Balassanian, Mahmoud Bakhshi Moakhar, Wafaa Bilal, Mehdi Farhadian, Shadi Ghadirian, Shilpa Gupta, Ghasem Hajizadeh, Shamsia Hassani, Sahand Hesamiyan, Sitara Ibrahimova, Pouran Jinchi, Amar Kanwar, Babak Kazemi, Ryas Komu, Farideh Lashai, Farokh Mahdavi, Ahmad Morshedloo, Mehrdad Mohebali, Huma Mulji, Azad Nanakeli, Jamal Penjweny, Imran Qureshi, Sara Rahbar, Rashid Rana, Atefeh Samaei, T. V. Santhosh, Walid Siti, Monir Shahroudy Farmanfarmaian, Mohsen Taasha Wahidi, Mitra Tabrizian, Parviz Tanavoli, Newsha Tavakolian, Sadegh Tirafkan, Hema Upadhyay, Saira Wasim
- 2017 - Bizhan Bassiri
- 2019 - Samira Alikhanza, Ali Mir-Azimi, and Reza Lavasani

=== Iraq ===
In 2011, Iraq returned to the Biennale for the first time after a 35-year absence. The title of the Iraq Pavilion was "Acqua Ferita" (translated as "Wounded Water"). Six Iraqi artists from two generations interpreted the theme of water in their works, which made up the exhibition.

List of exhibitors in the Iraqi Pavilion:

- 1976 — Saadi Al Kaabi, Dia al-Azzawi
- 2011 — Adel Abidin, Halim Al Karim, Ahmed Alsoudani, Ali Assaf, Azad Nanakeli, Walid Siti.
- 2013 — 'Welcome to Iraq', curated by Jonathan Watkins, commissioned by Ruya Foundation. Artists: Abdul Raheem Yassir (b. 1951), Akeel Khreef (b. 1979), Ali Samiaa (b. 1980), Bassim Al-Shaker (b. 1986), Cheeman Ismaeel (b. 1966), Furat al Jamil (b. 1965), Hareth Alhomaam (b. 1987), Jamal Penjweny (b. 1981), Kadhim Nwir (b. 1967), Yaseen Wami (b. 1973), Hashim Taeeh.
- 2015 — 'Invisible Beauty', curated by Philippe Van Cauteren, commissioned by Ruya Foundation. Artists: Latif Al Ani, Akam Shex Hadi, Rabab Ghazoul, Salam Atta Sabri and Haider Jabbar.
- 2017 — 'Archaic', curated by Tamara Chalabi and Paolo Colombo, commissioned by Ruya Foundation. Artists: Sherko Abbas, Sadik Kwaish Alfraji, Francis Alÿs, Ali Arkady, Luary Fadhil, Shakir Hassan Al Said, Nadine Hattom, Jawad Saleem, Sakar Sleman
- 2019 — 'Fatherland: Serwan Baran', curated by Tamara Chalabi and Paolo Colombo, commissioned by Ruya Foundation. Artist: Serwan Baran (b. 1968).

=== Ireland ===
List of exhibitors in the Irish Pavilion:

- 1950 — Norah McGuinness, Nano Reid
- 1956 — Louis le Brocquy, Hilary Heron
- 1960 — Patrick Scott
- 1993 — Dorothy Cross, Willie Doherty
- 1995 — Kathy Prendergast
- 1997 — Jaki Irvine, Alastair MacLennan
- 1999 — Anne Tallentire
- 2001 — Siobhan Hapaska, Grace Weir
- 2003 — Katie Holten (Commissioner: Valerie Connor)
- 2005 — Stephen Brandes, Mark Garry, Ronan McCrea, Isabel Nolan, Sarah Pierce, Walker and Walker (Commissioner: Sarah Glennie)
- 2007 — Gerard Byrne (Commissioner: Mike Fitzpatrick)
- 2009 — Sarah Browne, Gareth Kennedy, Kennedy Browne
- 2011 — Corban Walker (Commissioner: Emily-Jane Kirwan)
- 2013 — Richard Mosse (Commissioner: Anna O'Sullivan)
- 2015 — Sean Lynch, The Rubberbandits (Commissioner: Mike Fitzpatrick; curator: Woodrow Kernohan)
- 2017 — Jesse Jones, Olwen Fouéré (Curator: Tessa Giblin)
- 2019 — Eva Rothschild (Curator: Mary Cremin)
- 2022 — Niamh O'Malley (Curator: Temple Bar Gallery & Studios)

=== Italy ===
"Palazzo Pro Arte": Enrico Trevisanato, façade by Marius De Maria and Bartholomeo Bezzi, 1895; new façade by Guido Cirilli, 1914; "Padiglione Italia", present façade by Duilio Torres, 1932. The pavilion has a sculpture garden by Carlo Scarpa, 1952 and the "Auditorium Pastor" by Valeriano Pastor, 1977.

Partial list of exhibitors at the Italian Pavilion:

- 1895 — Giuseppe Ferrari
- 1905 — Giuseppe Ferrari
- 1912 — Aldo Carpi
- 1922 — Giuseppe Ferrari (posthumus)
- 1934 — Aldo Carpi, Carlo Martini
- 1936 — Aldo Carpi, Carlo Martini, Quinto Martini
- 1942 — Aldo Carpi, Trento Longaretti
- 1948 — Aldo Carpi, Trento Longaretti, Carlo Martini
- 1950 — Aldo Carpi, Trento Longaretti, Carlo Martini
- 1966 — Ferruccio Bortoluzzi, Trento Longaretti
- 1968 — Valerio Adami, Rodolfo Aricò, Gianni Bertini, Arturo Bonfanti, Gianni Colombo, Mario Deluigi, Gianfranco Ferroni, Luciano Gaspari, Lorenzo Guerrini, Giovanni Korompay, Leoncillo Leonardi, Carlo Mattioli, Livio Marzot, Mirko, Marcello Morandini, Mario Nigro, Gino Morandis, Pino Pascali, Gastone Novelli, Achille Perilli, Michelangelo Pistoletto, Tancredi, Guido Strazza, Giacomo Porzano
- 1984 — Roberto Barni, Alberto Burri, Enrico Castellani, Mario Ceroli, Sandro Chia, Giorgio de Chirico, Luciano Fabro, Tano Festa, Carlo Maria Mariani, Gino Marotta, Titina Maselli, Luigi Ontani, Giulio Paolini, Claudio Parmiggiani, Vettor Pisani, Michelangelo Pistoletto, Giò Pomodoro, Mario Schifano, Toti Scialoja, Massimo Scolari, Giuseppe Uncini, Luigi Nono (Curator: Maurizio Calvesi)
- 1986 — Getulio Alviani, Giovanni Anselmo, Marco Bagnoli, Toni Benetton, Alighiero Boetti, Paolo Borghi, Francesco Borromini, Nicola Carrino, Claudio Costa, Sergio Dangelo, Giorgio de Chirico, Luciano Fabro, Piero Fogliati, Lucio Fontana, Alberto Giacometti, Piero Manzoni, Fausto Melotti, Mario Merz, Maurizio Mochetti, Luigi Ontani, Mimmo Paladino, Giulio Paolini, Claudio Parmiggiani, Pino Pascali, Luca Patella, Giuseppe Penone, Attilio Pierelli, Vettor Pisani, Michelangelo Pistoletto, Fabrizio Plessi, Enrico Prampolini, Alberto Savinio, Paolo Tessari, Emilio Vedova, Gilberto Zorio (Curator: Maurizio Calvesi)
- 1988 — Carla Accardi, Roberto Barni, Alberto Burri, Andrea Cascella, Antonio Catelani, Mario Ceroli, Sandro Chia, Eduardo Chillida, Francesco Clemente, Enzo Cucchi, Daniela De Lorenzo, Piero Dorazio, Carlo Guaita, Felice Levini, Eliseo Mattiacci, Marisa Merz, Maurizio Mochetti, Ennio Morlotti, Mimmo Paladino, Maurizio Pellegrin, Alfredo Pirri, Arnaldo Pomodoro, Giò Pomodoro, Renato Ranaldi, Giuseppe Santomaso, Susana Solano, Alberto Viani (Curator: Giovanni Carandente)
- 1990 — Davide Benati, Gino De Dominicis, Nicola De Maria, Luigi Mainolfi, Giuseppe Maraniello, Carlo Maria Mariani, Claudio Olivieri (Curators: Laura Cherubini, Flaminio Gualdoni, Lea Vergine)
- 1993 — Francesco Clemente, Luciano Fabbro, Sergio Fermariello, Emilio Isgrò, Fabio Mauri, Eugenio Miccini, Hidetoshi Nagasawa, Luisa Protti, Sergio Sarra, Franco Vaccari (Curator: Achille Bonito Oliva)
- 1995 — Lorenzo Bonechi, Ida Cadorin Barbarigo, Roberto Capucci, Francesco Clemente, Amalia Del Ponte, Stefano Di Stasio, Paolo Gallerani, Paola Gandolfi, Nunzio, Luigi Ontani, Claudio Parmiggiani, Gianni Pisani, Pier Luigi Pizzi, Angelo Savelli, Ruggero Savino, Ettore Spalletti, Vito Tongiani, Mino Trafeli, Giuliano Vangi (Curator: Jean Clair)
- 1997 — Maurizio Cattelan, Enzo Cucchi, Ettore Spalletti (Curator: Germano Celant)
- 1999 — Monica Bonvicini, Bruna Esposito, Luisa Lambri, Paola Pivi, Grazia Toderi (Curator: Harald Szeemann)
- 2001 — Alighiero Boetti, Barry McGee, Todd James, Steve Powers (Curators: Pio Baldi, Paolo Colombo, Sandra Pinto)
- 2003 — Charles Avery, Avish Khebrehzadeh, Sara Rossi, Carola Spadoni (Curators: Pio Baldi, Monica Pignatti Morano and Paolo Colombo). A12, Alessandra Ariatti, Micol Assaël, Diego Perrone, Patrick Tuttofuoco, Zimmer Frei (curator: Massimiliano Gioni)
- 2005 — Carolina Antich, Manfredi Beninati, Loris Cecchini, Lara Favaretto (Curators: Pio Baldi, Monica Pignatti Morano and Paolo Colombo)
- 2007 — Giuseppe Penone, Francesco Vezzoli (Curator: Ida Gianelli)
- 2009 — Matteo Basilé, Manfredi Beninati, Valerio Berruti, Bertozzi & Casoni, Nicola Bolla, Sandro Chia, Marco Cingolani, Giacomo Costa, Aron Demetz, Roberto Floreani, Daniele Galliano, Marco Lodola, MASBEDO, Gian Marco Montesano, Davide Nido, Luca Pignatelli, Elisa Sighicelli, Sissi, Nicola Verlato, Silvio Wolf (Curators: Luca Beatrice and Beatrice Buscaroli)
- 2011 — L'Arte non è Cosa Nostra, a group show with 250 artists, including Valerio Adami, Vanessa Beecroft, Agostino Bonalumi, Enzo Cucchi, Roberto Ferri, Silvio Formichetti, Michelangelo Pistoletto, Rabarama and Oliviero Toscani (Curator: Vittorio Sgarbi)
- 2013 — Francesco Arena, Massimo Bartolini, Gianfranco Baruchello, Elisabetta Benassi, Flavio Favelli, Luigi Ghirri, Piero Golia, Francesca Grilli, Marcello Maloberti, Fabio Mauri, Giulio Paolini, Marco Tirelli, Luca Vitone, Sislej Xhafa (Curator: Bartolomeo Pietromarchi)
- 2015 — Alis/Filliol, Andrea Aquilanti, Francesco Barocco, Vanessa Beecroft, Antonio Biasiucci, Giuseppe Caccavale, Paolo Gioli, Jannis Kounellis, Nino Longobardi, Marzia Migliora, Luca Monterastelli, Mimmo Paladino, Claudio Parmeggiani, Nicola Samorì, Aldo Tambellini (Curator: Vincenzo Trione)
- 2017 — Giorgio Andreotta Calò, Roberto Cuoghi, Adelita Husni-Bey (Curator: Cecilia Alemani)
- 2019 — Enrico David, Chiara Fumai, Liliana Moro (Curator: Milovan Farronato)
- 2021 – Gian Maria Tosatti (Curator: Eugenio Viola)

=== Republic of Kazakhstan ===
List of exhibitors and curators in the Kazakhstan Pavilion:

- 2022 — ORTA Collective: Alexandra Morozova, Rustem Begenov, Darya Jumelya, Alexandr Bakanov, Sabina Kuangaliyeva. (Curator: ORTA Collective, Commissioner: Meruyert Kaliyeva)

=== Republic of Kosovo ===
List of exhibitors in the Kosovo Pavilion:

- 2013 — Petrit Halilaj (Curator: Kathrin Rhomberg. Commissioner: Erzen Shkololli)
- 2015 — Flaka Haliti (Curator: Nicolaus Schafhausen)
- 2017 — Sislej Xhafa (Curator: Arta Agani, Commissioner: Valon Ibraj)
- 2019 — Alban Muja (Curator: Vincent Honoré)

=== Kuwait ===
List of exhibitors in the Kuwait Pavilion:

- 2013 — "National Works" featuring works by Sami Mohammad and Tarek Al-Ghoussein (Curator: Ala Younis, Commissioner: National Council for Culture, Arts and Letters)

=== Lebanon ===
Lebanon was present at the Biennale for the first time in 2007. After being absent in 2009 and 2011, it is coming back in 2013.

- 2007 — Foreword: Fouad Elkoury, Lamia Joreige, Walid Sadek, Mounira Al Solh and Akram Zaatari (Curators: Saleh Barakat, Sandra Dagher)
- 2013 — Akram Zaatari (Curators: Sam Bardaouil, Till Fellrath)
- 2017 — Zad Moultaka (Curator: Emmanuel Daydé)

=== Latvia ===
List of exhibitors in the Latvian Pavilion:

- 2001 — Laila Pakalniņa

=== Lithuania ===
List of exhibitors in the Lithuanian Pavilion:

- 1999 — Mindaugas Navakas and Eglė Rakauskaitė
- 2001 — Deimantas Narkevičius
- 2003 — Svajonė Stanikas and Paulius Stanikas
- 2005 — Jonas Mekas
- 2007 — Nomeda Urbonienė and Gediminas Urbonas
- 2009 — Žilvinas Kempinas
- 2011 — Darius Mikšys
- 2013 — Gintaras Didžiapetris, Elena Narbutaitė, Liudvikas Buklys, Kazys Varnelis, Vytautė Žilinskaitė, Morten Norbye Halvorsen, Jason Dodge, Gabriel Lester, Dexter Sinister (Curator: Raimundas Malašauskas)
- 2015 — Dainius Liškevičius
- 2017 — Žilvinas Landzbergas
- 2019 — Rugilė Barzdžiukaitė, Vaiva Grainytė, Lina Lapelytė
- 2022 — Robertas Narkus
- 2024 — Pakui Hardware (Neringa Černiauskaitė and Ugnius Gelguda) and Marija Teresė Rožanskaitė

=== Luxembourg ===
The Cà del Duca, situated on the Canale Grande, has been the permanent site for Luxembourg's participations in the Venice Biennale since 1999.

List of exhibitors in the Luxembourg Pavilion:

- 1990 — Marie-Paule Feiereisen
- 1993 — Jean-Marie Biwer, Bertrand Ney
- 1995 — Bert Theis
- 1997 — Luc Wolf
- 1999 — Simone Decker
- 2001 — Doris Drescher
- 2003 — Su-Mei Tse
- 2007 — Jill Mercedes
- 2009 — Gast Bouschet, Nadine Hilbert
- 2011 — Martine Feipel, Jean Bechameil (Curator: René Kockelkorn)
- 2013 — Catherine Lorent
- 2015 — Filip Markiewicz (Curator: Paul Ardenne)
- 2017 — Mike Bourscheid (Curator: Kevin Muhlen)
- 2019 — Marco Godinho

=== Macao ===
List of exhibitors in the Macao Pavilion:

- 2015 — Mio Pang Fei

=== Maldives ===
The Maldives Pavilion was introduced in 2013.

List of exhibitors in the Maldives Pavilion:

- 2013 — Mohamed Ali, Sama Alshaibi, Ursula Biemann, Stefano Cagol, Wael Darwesh, Moomin Fouad, Thierry Geoffrey (aka Colonel), Khaled Hafez, Heidrun Holzfeind & Christoph Draeger, Hanna Husberg, Laura McLean & Kalliopi Tsipni-Kolaza, Achilleas Kentonis & Maria Papacaharalambous, Paul Miller (aka DJ Spooky), Gregory Niemeyer, Khaled Ramada, Oliver Ressler, Klaus Schafler, Patrizio Travagli, Wooloo (Sixten Kai Nielsen and Martin Rosengaard), (Curators CPS – Chamber of Public Secrets: Alfredo Cramerotti, Aida Eltorie, Khaled Ramadan)

=== Malta ===
The Malta Pavilion returned to the Venice Biennale in 2017. They also exhibited in 2000 and 1958.

List of exhibitors in the Malta Pavilion:

- 1958 — Carmelo Mangion, Antoine Camilleri, Emvin Cremona, Frank Portelli, Josef Kalleya
- 1999 — Vince Briffa, Norbert Francis Attard, Ray Pitre (Curator: Adrian Bartolo)
- 2017 — Adrian Abela, John Paul Azzopardi, Aaron Bezzina, Pia Borg, Gilbert Calleja, Austin Camilleri, Roxman Gatt, David Pisani, Karine Rougier, Joe Sacco, Teresa Sciberras, Darren Tanti and Maurice Tanti Burlo’ and artefacts from Heritage Malta’s National collection, Ghaqda tal-Pawlini, private collections and various archives (Curators: Raphael Vella and Bettina Hutschek)
- 2022 – Arcangelo Sassolino

=== Mauritius ===
The Pavilion of Mauritius was introduced in 2015 with an exhibition ‘From One Citizen You Gather an Idea’.

- 2015 — Tania Antoshina, Djuneid Dulloo, Sultana Haukim, Nirmal Hurry, Alix Le Juge, Olga Jürgenson, Helge Leiberg, Krishna Luchoomun, Bik Van Der Pol, Vitaly Pushnitsky, Römer + Römer, Kavinash Thomoo (Curators: Olga Jürgenson, Alfredo Cramerotti, Commissioner: pARTage)
- 2017 — Michael Lalljee, Robert Rauschenberg, SEO, Jacques Desiré, Wong So (Curator: Olga Jürgenson, Executor: Krishna Luchoomun, Commissioner: Thivynaidoo Perumal Naiken)

=== Mexico ===
The Mexican Pavilion was introduced for the first time in 1950 with the participation of the Muralists: David Alfaro Siqueiros, Diego Rivera, José Clemente Orozco and Rufino Tamayo. For this participation, David Alfaro Siqueiros was awarded the 1st prize to foreign artists. The national participation was interrupted until 2007. The exhibitors that have represented the pavilion are:

- 1950 — David Alfaro Siqueiros, Diego Rivera, José Clemente Orozco, Rufino Tamayo
- 2007 — Rafael Lozano-Hemmer
- 2009 — Teresa Margolles
- 2011 — Melanie Smith
- 2013 — Ariel Guzik
- 2015 — Tania Candiani, Luis Felipe Ortega
- 2017 — Carlos Amorales (Curator: Pablo León De La Barra)

=== Mongolia ===
Names of exhibitions, exhibitors, curators and organizers of the Mongolia Pavilion:

- 2015 — Other Home. Artists Unen Enkh and Enkhbold Togmidshiirev, Commissioner Gantuya Badamgarav, Curator Uranchimeg Tsultem and Organizer Mongolian Contemporary Art Support Association
- 2017 — Lost in Tngri. Artists Chimeddorj Shagdarjav, Enkhtaivan Ochirbat, Munkkh - Munkhbolor Ganbold, Davaajargal Tsaschikher, Bolortuvshin Jargalsainkhan, Commissioner Munkh-Orgil Tsend, Project Director Gantuya Badamgarav, Curator Dalkh-Ochir Yondonjunai and Organizer Mongolian Contemporary Art Support Association
- 2019 — A Temporality. Artist Jantsankhorol Erdenebayar, with the participation of Mongolian throat singers Ashit Nergui, Damdin Khadkhuu, Undarmaa Altangerel, Davaasuren Damjin and guest artist Carsten Nicolai. Curator Gantuya Badamgarav, co-curator Carsten Nicolai, Commissioner The Ministry of Education, Culture, Science and Sports of Mongolia and Organizer Mongolian Contemporary Art Support Association
- 2022 — A Journey Through Vulnerability. Artist Munkhtsetseg Jalkhaajav. Curator Gantuya Badamgarav. Commissioner Nomin Chinbat, Minister of Culture.

=== Namibia ===
The Republic of Namibia officially participated for the first time at the 59th Venice Biennale in 2022 with the exhibition A Bridge to the Desert curated by Marco Furio Ferrario, exhibiting the works of solo artist Renn. Covering an area of 20 hectares, the national participation was the most extensive of its edition and one of the most extensive of the history of Biennale. The exhibition included two introductory paths to the main works: a 140x2 meters wall covered with Namib desert pictures by Roland Blum (photographer) and an immersive-interactive installation titled Seek to believe by Studio Amebe.

List of exhibitors in the Namibian Pavilion:

- 2022 — Renn (Curator: Marco Furio Ferrario; Exhibition Director & Curatorial research: Stefano Morelli; Introductory Landscape Desert Photos by Roland Blum, Seek to Believe installation by AMEBE)

=== Nauru ===
The Republic of Nauru officially participated for the first time at the 61st Venice Biennale in 2026. Exhibitors, curators and organizers of the Nauru Pavilion:

- 2026 — Artists: Kauw Tsitsi, CPS-Chamber of Public Secrets, Patricia Jacomella Bonola, Tedo Rekhviashvili, Sylvia Grace Borda, Ron Laboray, Dorian Batycka, Khaled Hafez, Iv Toshain, Stefano Cagol. Commissioner Isabella Dageago. Curators Khaled Ramadan, Camilla Boemio, Stefano Cagol. Commissioned by Ministry of National Heritage, Culture, and Tourism of the Republic of Nauru

=== New Zealand ===
List of exhibitors in the New Zealand Pavilion:

- 2001 — Peter Robinson and Jacqueline Fraser (Curator: Gregory Burke)
- 2003 — Michael Stevenson (Curators: Robert Leonard and Boris Kremer)
- 2005 — et al. (Curator: Natasha Conland)
- 2007 — Brett Graham and Frank Fu
- 2009 — Judy Millar (Curator: Leonhard Emmerling) and Francis Upritchard (Curators: Heather Galbraith and Francesco Manacorda)
- 2011 — Michael Parekowhai (Curator: Jenny Harper)
- 2013 — Bill Culbert (Curator: Justin Paton)
- 2015 — Simon Denny (Curator: Robert Leonard)
- 2017 — Lisa Reihana (Curator: Rhana Devenport)
- 2019 — Dane Mitchell (Curators: Chris Sharp and Zara Stanhope)
- 2022 — Yuki Kihara (Curator: Natalie King)
- 2024 – cancelled

=== Nigeria ===
List of exhibitors in the Nigerian Pavilion:

- 2017 – Peju Alatise, Victor Ehikhamenor, Quddus Onikeku (Curator: Adenrele Sonariwo)
- 2024 — Tunji Adeniyi-Jones, Ndidi Dike, Onyeka Igwe, Toyin Ojih Odutola, Abraham Oghobase, Precious Okoyomon, Yinka Shonibare, Fatimah Tuggar (Curator: Aindrea Emelife)

=== North Macedonia ===
List of exhibitors in the Macedonian Pavilion:

- 1993 — Gligor Stefanov and Petre Nikoloski
- 1997 — Aneta Svetieva
- 1999 — Iskra Dimitrova
- 2001 — Javon Sumkovski
- 2003 — Zaneta Bangeli and Vana Urosebic
- 2005 — Antoni Maznevski
- 2007 — Blagoja Manevski
- 2009 — Nikola Uzunovski and Goce Nanevski
- 2011 — Zarko Basevski and ZERO
- 2013 — Elpida Hadzi-Vasileva
- 2015 — Hristina Ivanoska, Yane Calovski (Curator: Basak Senova)
- 2017 — Tome Adzievski (Curator: Branislav Sarkanjac)
- 2019 — Nada Prlja (Curator: Jovanka Popova)

=== Northern Ireland ===
List of exhibitors in the Northern Ireland Pavilion:

- 2005 — "The Nature of Things", group show with Patrick Bloomer, Patrick Keogh, Ian Charlesworth, Factotum, Séamus Harahan, Michael Hogg, Sandra Johnston, Mary McIntyre, Katrina Moorhead, William McKeown, Darren Murray, Aisling O'Beirn, Peter Richards and Alistair Wilson (curator: Hugh Mulholland)
- 2007 — Willie Doherty (Curator: Hugh Mulholland)
- 2009 — Susan MacWilliam (Curator: Karen Downey)

=== Pakistan ===
In 2019, Pakistan officially participated in the Venice Biennale for the first time.

List of exhibitors in the Pakistani Pavilion:

- 2019 — Naiza Khan (Curator: Zahra Khan)

=== Panama ===
The Republic of Panama officially participated for the first time at the 60th Venice Biennale in 2024 with the exhibition Traces: On the Body and on the Land curated by Ana Elizabeth González, Mónica Kupfer, and Luz Bonadies.

List of exhibitors at the Panamanian Pavilion:

- 2024 — Giana De Dier, Isabel De Obaldía, Brooke Alfaro, Cisco Merel.

=== Peru ===
List of exhibitors in the Peruvian Pavilion:

- 2015 — Raimond Chávez, Gilda Mantilla (Curator: Max Hernández-Calvo)
- 2017 — Juan Javier Salazar (Curator: Rodrigo Quijano)

=== Philippines ===
List of exhibitors in the Philippines Pavilion:

- 1964 — Jose Joya
- 2015 — Manuel Conde, Carlos Francisco, Manny Montelibano, Jose Tence Ruiz (Curator: Patrick D. Flores)
- 2017 — Manuel Ocampo, Lani Maestro (Curator: Joselina Cruz)
- 2019 — Mark Justiniani (Curator: Tessa Maria Guazon)

=== Portugal ===
In 1997, Portugal announced plans to build its own pavilion; these have not materialized since.

List of exhibitors:

- 1997 – Julião Sarmento
- 2007 – Ângela Ferreira
- 2011 – Francisco Tropa (Curator: Sergio Mah)
- 2013 – Joana Vasconcelos (Curator: Miguel Amado)
- 2015 – João Louro (Curator: María de Corral)
- 2017 – José Pedro Croft (Curator: João Pinharanda)
- 2019 – Leonor Antunes (Curator: João Ribas)
- 2022 – Pedro Neves Marques (Curator: João Mourão and Luís Silva ) at Palazzo Franchetti
- 2024 – Mónica de Miranda, Sónia Vaz Borges and Vânia Gala (Curator: Sara Antónia Matos) at Palazzo Franchetti
- 2026 – Alexandre Estrela (Curator: Ana Baliza and Ricardo Nicolau) at Fondaco Marcello

=== San Marino ===
List of exhibitors:

- 1982 — Gilberto Giovagnoli, Walter Gasperoni (curated by Achille Bonito Oliva)
- 2011 — Group exhibition of 13 artists, including Dorothee Albrecht, Marco Bravura, Cristian Ceccaroni, Daniela Comani, Ottavio Fabbri, Verdiano Manzi, Patrizia Merendi, Omar Paolucci, Cristina Rotondaro, Lars Teichmann, Thea Tini, Daniela Tonelli, Paola Turroni
- 2015 — Group exhibition of 11 artists, including Xu De Qi, Liu Ruowang, Ma Yuan, Li Lei, Zhang Hong Mei, Eleonora Mazza, Giovanni Giulianelli, Giancarlo Frisoni, Tony Margiotta, Elisa Monaldi, Valentina Pazzini
- 2019 — Group exhibition of 12 artists including Gisella Battistini, Gabriele Gambuti, Giovanna Fra, Thea Tini, Chen Chengwei, Li Geng, Dario Ortiz, Tang Shuangning, Jens W. Beyrich, Xing Junqin, Xu de Qi, and Sebastián. Special Project by Martina Conti curated by Alessandro Castiglioni and Emma Zanella

=== Scotland ===
Scotland has participated in the Biennale since 2003 as a collateral event. Scotland + Venice is a partnership between the Scottish government and various British arts organizations, including the British Council and the National Galleries of Scotland.

List of exhibitors in the Scottish Pavilion:

- 2003 — Claire Barclay, Jim Lambie, Simon Starling
- 2005 — Alex Pollard, Joanne Tatham & Tom O'Sullivan, Cathy Wilkes
- 2007 — Charles Avery, Henry Coombes, Louise Hopkins, Rosalind Nashashibi, Lucy Skaer, Tony Swain,
- 2009 — Martin Boyce
- 2011 — Karla Black
- 2013 — Corin Sworn, Duncan Campbell, Hayley Tompkins
- 2015 — Graham Fagen
- 2017 — Rachel Maclean
- 2019 — Charlotte Prodger
- 2022 – Alberta Whittle
- 2024 – cancelled
- 2026 – Bugarin + Castle

=== Seychelles ===
The Seychelles Pavilion was first introduced in 2015, by the proposal of artist Nitin Shroff, featuring "A Clockwork Sunset". The Pavilion was commissioned by the Seychelles Art Projects Foundation and curated by Sarah J. McDonald and Victor Schaub Wong.

List of exhibitors in the Seychelles Pavilion:

- 2015 — George Camille, Leon Wilma Lois Radegonde
- 2017 — Alyssa Adams, Tristan Adams, George Camille, Christine Chetty-Payet, Zoe Chong Seng, Daniel Dodin, Charle Dodo, Allen Ernest Christine Harter, Nigel Henri, Alcide Libanotis, Marc Luc, Egbert Marday, Colbert Nourrice, Leon Radegonde, Danny Sopha (Curator: Martin Kennedy)

=== Singapore ===
List of exhibitors in the Singapore Pavilion:

- 2001 — Chen KeZhan, Salleh Japar, Matthew Ngui, Suzann Victor (Curators: Ahmad Mashadi and Joanna Lee)
- 2003 — Heman Chong, Francis Ng, Tan Swie Hian (Curator: Low Sze Wee)
- 2005 — Lim Tzay Chuen (Curator: Eugene Tan)
- 2007 — Tang Da Wu, Vincent Leow, Jason Lim and Zulkifle Mahmod (Curator: Lindy Poh)
- 2009 — Ming Wong (Curator: Tang Fu Kuen)
- 2011 — Ho Tzu Nyen (Curator: June Yap)
- 2015 — Charles Lim (Curator: Shabbir Hussain Mustafa)
- 2017 — Zai Kuning (No curator)
- 2019 — Ang Song-Ming (Curator: Michelle Ho)
- 2022 — Shubigi Rao (Curator: Ute Meta Bauer)
- 2024 — Robert Zhao Renhui (Curator: Haeju Kim)

=== Slovenia ===
List of exhibitors in the Slovenian Pavilion:

- 2007 — Tobias Putrih
- 2009 — Miha Štrukelj
- 2013 — Jasmina Cibic
- 2015 — Jaša Mrevlje Pollak (Curators: Michele Drascek, Aurora Fonda)
- 2017 — Nika Autor (Curator: Andreja Hribernik)
- 2019 — Marko Peljhan

=== South Africa ===
- 1993 — Jackson Hlungwane, Sandra Kriel, Tommy Matswai (Curator: Christopher Till)
- 1995 — Randolph Hartzenberg, Brett Murray (Curator: Malcolm Payne)
- 2011 — Mary Sibande, Siemon Allen, Lyndi Sales (Curator: Thembinkosi Goniwe)
- 2013 — Nelisiwe Xaba, Zanele Muholi, Wim Botha, Joanne Bloch, David Koloane, Gerhard Marx, Maja Marx, Philip Miller, Cameron Platter, John Muafangejo, Johannes Phokela, Andrew Putter, Alfred Martin Duggan-Cronin, Penny Siopis, Kay Hassan, Sue Williamson, Donna Kukama, Athi-Patra Ruga, James Webb, Kemang wa Lehulere, Sam Nhlengethwa (Curator: Brenton Maart)
- 2015 — Willem Boshoff, Haroon Gunn-Salie, Angus Gibson, Mark Lewis, Gerald Machona, Mohau Modisakeng, Nandipha Mntambo, Brett Murray, Serge Alain Nitegeka, Jo Ratcliffe, Robin Rhode, Warrick Sony, Diane Victor, Jeremy Wafer (Curators: Christopher Till and Jeremy Rose)
- 2017 — Candice Breitz, Mohau Modisakeng (Curator: Lucy MacGarry)
- 2019 — Mawande Ka Zenzile, Dineo Seshee Bopape, Tracey Rose (Curators: Nkule Mabaso, Nomusa Makhubu )

=== Taiwan ===
The Taiwan Pavilion is housed in the Palazzo delle Prigioni

- 2011 - Hong-Kai Wang and Yu-Hsien Su (Curated by Amy Cheng)
- 2013 - Bernd Behr, Chia-Wei Hsu, Kateřina Šedá and BATEŽO MIKILU (Curated by Esther Lu)
- 2015 - Wu Tien-chang
- 2017 - Tehching Hsieh (Curated by Adrian Heathfield)
- 2019 - Shu Lea Cheang (Curated by Paul B. Preciado)

=== Türkiye ===
In 2013, Türkiye signed a 20-year lease for a national pavilion at the Venice Biennale. The state-funded Istanbul Foundation for Culture and Arts is the co-ordinator of the Turkish pavilion.

List of exhibitors in the Turkish Pavilion:

- 1956 - Group exhibition, by Istanbul Academy of Fine Arts (Commissioner: Sabri Berkel)
- 1958 - Group exhibition, by Istanbul Academy of Fine Arts (Commissioner: Nijad Sirel, Sabri Berkel)
- 1962 - Group exhibition, by Istanbul Academy of Fine Arts (Commissioner: Sabri Berkel)
- 1990 — Kemal Önsoy, Mithat Şen (Curator: Beral Madra)
- 1993 — Erdağ Aksel, Serhat Kiraz, Jȧrg Geismar, Adem Yılmaz (Curator: Beral Madra)
- 2001 — Murat Morova, Butch Morris, Ahmet Öktem, Sermin Sherif, Xurban.net (Güven Icirlioğlu & Hakan Topal) (Curator: Beral Madra)
- 2003 — Nuri Bilge Ceylan, Ergin Çavuşoğlu, Gül Ilgaz, Neriman Polat, Nazif Topçuoğlu (Curator: Beral Madra)
- 2005 — Hussein Chalayan (Curator: Beral Madra)
- 2007 — Hüseyin Alptekin (Curator: Vasif Kortun)
- 2009 — Banu Cennetoğlu, Ahmet Öğüt (Curator: Basak Senova)
- 2011 — Ayşe Erkmen (Curator: Fulya Erdemci)
- 2013 — Ali Kazma (Curator: Emre Baykal)
- 2015 — Sarkis (Curator: Defne Ayas)
- 2017 — Cevdet Erek
- 2019 — İnci Eviner (Curator: Zeynep Öz)

=== Tuvalu ===
Despite the cost to the third world country, Tuvalu decided to develop its first national pavilion in 2013 to highlight the negative effects of global warming on the nation, which is forecast to be one of the first countries to disappear due to sea level rise caused by climate change. After working closely with Taiwanese eco artist Vincent J.F. Huang at the 2012 UNFCCC COP18 session in Doha, Qatar and collaborating with the artist on several occasions, Tuvalu's government invited Huang to act as the representative artist for the pavilion. All of the artworks at the 2013 Tuvalu Pavilion focused on climate change and included In the Name of Civilization, a giant oil rig turned agent of destruction, and Prisoner's Dilemma, a depiction of the Statue of Liberty kneeling in apology to ghostly portraits of terra-cotta penguins symbolic of ecological sacrifices made to further the development of human civilization.

List of exhibitors for the Tuvalu Pavilion:

- 2013 — Vincent J.F. Huang (Curators: An-Yi Pan, Li Szuhsien, Shih Shuping)
- 2015 — Vincent J.F. Huang (Curator: Thomas J. Berghuis)

=== Ukraine ===
The PinchukArtCentre sponsored Ukraine's pavilions in 2007, 2009 and 2015.

List of exhibitors in the Ukrainian Pavilion:

- 2003 – Victor Sydorenko "Millstones of Time", Ukraine
- 2005 — Mykola Babak «Your Children, Ukraine» (Curator: Oleksiy Tytarenko)
- 2007 – Victor Sydorenko "«A Poem about an Inland Sea» (in collaboration)
- 2011 — Oksana Mas «Post-vs-Proto-Renaissance» (Curator: Oleksiy Rogotchenko)
- 2013 — Ridnyi Mykola, Zinkovskyi Hamlet, Kadyrova Zhanna (Curators: Soloviov Oleksandr, Burlaka Victoria)
- 2015 — Yevgenia Belorusets, Nikita Kadan, Zhanna Kadyrova, Mykola Ridnyi & Serhiy Zhadan, Artem Volokitin, Anna Zvyagintseva and Open Group (Curator: Björn Geldhof)
- 2017 — Boris Mikhailov (Curator: Peter Doroshenko)

=== United Arab Emirates ===
The United Arab Emirates' Venice pavilion first opened in 2009, but 2015 was the first time an Emirati has served as curator.

List of exhibitors in the UAE Pavilion:

- 2009 — Lamya Gargash (Commissioner: Dr Lamees Hamdan; Curator: Tirdad Zolghadr)
- 2011 — Abdullah Al Saadi, Sheikha Lateefa bint Maktoum, Reem Al Ghaith (Curator: Vasif Kortun)
- 2013 — Mohammed Kazem (Commissioner: Dr. Lamees Hamdan; Curator: Reem Fadda)
- 2015 — Hassan Sharif, Mohammed Kazem, Abdullah Al Saadi, Ahmed Al Ansari, Moosa Al Halyan, Mohammed Al Qassab, Abdul Qader Al Rais, Mohammed Abdullah Bulhiah, Salem Jawhar, Dr. Najat Makki, Abdulraheem Salim, Obaid Suroor, Dr. Mohamed Yousif, and Abdulrahman Zainal (Curator: Hoor Al Qasimi)
- 2017 — Nujoom Al-Ghanem, Sara Al Haddad, Vikram Divecha, Lantian Xie, Mohamed Yousif. (Curator: Hammad Nasar)
- 2019 — Nujoom Al-Ghanem (Curators: Sam Bardaouil and Till Fellrath)

=== Wales ===
The Wales pavilion was introduced in 2003.

List of exhibitors in the Wales Pavilion:

- 2003 — Bethan Huws & Cerith Wyn Evans & Simon Pope Simon Pope | Art Work - About
- 2005 — Peter Finnemore, Laura Ford & Paul Granjon
- 2007 — Richard Deacon, Merlin James, Heather and Ivan Morison
- 2009 — John Cale
- 2011 — Tim Davies
- 2013 — Bedwyr Williams
- 2015 — Helen Sear (Curator: Ffotogallery)
- 2017 — James Richards
- 2019 — Sean Edwards (Curator: Marie-Anne McQuay)

=== Zimbabwe ===
- 2011 — Tapfuma Gutsa, Misheck Masamvu, Berry Bickle, Calvin Dondo (Commissioner: Doreen Sibanda; curator: Raphael Chikukwa)
- 2013 — Portia Zvavahera, Michele Mathison, Rashid Jogee, Voti Thebe, Virginia Chihota (Commissioner: Doreen Sibanda; curator: Raphael Chikukwa)
- 2015 — Chikonzero Chazunguza, Masimba Hwati, Gareth Nyandoro (Commissioner: Doreen Sibanda; curator: Raphael Chikukwa)
- 2017 — Charles Bhebe, Admire Kamudzengerere, Sylvester Mubayi, Dana Whabira (Commissioner: Doreen Sibanda; curator: Raphael Chikukwa)
- 2019 — Kudzanai-Violet Hwami, Neville Starling, Georgina Maxim, Cosmas Shiridzinomwa (Commissioner: Doreen Sibanda; curator: Raphael Chikukwa)
- 2021 — Wallen Mapondera, Ronald Muchatuta, Kresiah Mukwazhi, Terrence Musekiwa (Commissioner: Raphael Chikukwa; Curator: Fadzai Veronica Muchemwa)

=== List of Countries at the 2026 festival ===
source https://www.labiennale.org/en/art/2026/national-participations

list

Albania Argentina Armenia (Republic of) Australia Austria Azerbaijan (Republic of) Bahamas (The) Belgium Bosnia and Herzegovina Brazil Bulgaria Cameroon (Republic of) Canada Chile China (People's Republic of) Congo (Democratic Republic of) Croatia Cuba Cyprus (Republic of) Czech (Republic) and Slovak (Republic) Denmark Ecuador Egypt El Salvador Equatorial Guinea (Republic of) Estonia Ethiopia Finland France Georgia Germany Grand Duchy of Luxembourg Great Britain Greece Grenada Guatemala Guinea (Republic of) Haiti (Republic of) Holy See Hungary Iceland India Indonesia Ireland Israel Italy Japan Kazakhstan (Republic of) Korea (Republic of) Kosovo (Republic of) Kyrgyz Republic Latvia Lebanon Lithuania Malta Mexico Moldova (Republic of) Mongolia Montenegro Morocco (Kingdom of) Nauru (Republic of) Netherlands (The) New Zealand Nordic Countries (Finland, Norway, Sweden) North Macedonia (Republic of) Oman (Sultanate of) Pakistan Panama (Republic of) Peru Philippines Poland Portugal Qatar Romania Russia San Marino (Republic of) Saudi Arabia Senegal Serbia Seychelles (Republic of) Sierra Leone (Republic of) Singapore Somalia (Federal Republic of) Spain Switzerland Syrian Arab Republic Tanzania (United Republic of) Timor-Leste (Democratic Republic of) Türkiye Uganda Ukraine United Arab Emirates United States of America Uruguay Uzbekistan (Republic of) Viet nam (Socialist Republic of) Zimbabwe (Republic of)

== Bibliography ==
- Russeth, Andrew (April 17, 2019). "The Venice Biennale: Everything You Could Ever Want to Know". ARTnews. Archived from the original on April 20, 2019.
- Volpi, Cristiana (2013). "Pavilions/Historical Background". In Re Rebaudengo, Adele (ed.). Pavilions and Garden of Venice Biennale. Rome: Contrasto. pp. 163–195. ISBN 978-88-6965-440-4.
