= Vajiko Chachkhiani =

Georgian visual artist

Vajiko Chachkhiani (Georgian: ვაჟიკო ჩაჩხიანი) is a Georgian artist whose work mostly involves film, sculpture, photography and visual installations. Currently he lives and works in Berlin, Germany and Tbilisi, Georgia. Chachkhiani's work has been shown at the Venice Biennale.

== Early life ==
Vajiko Chachkhiani was born in Tbilisi, Georgia. He studied Mathematics and Informatics at the Georgian Technical University, Tbilisi, before turning to Fine Arts, which he studied at Universität der Künste, Berlin, Germany and Gerrit Rietveld Academie in Amsterdam, Netherlands.

== Career ==
At the Venice Biennale in 2017, he showcased a Georgian log cabin, that he received from the mining town of Chiatura. The cabin was filled with typical furniture and ordinary objects. Eventually, the rain started getting inside the work, causing moss to grow and creating an inversion between inside and outside. The title "A Living Dog in the Midst of Dead Lions" probably relates to the exhibition's location in Venice, whose symbol is the lion.

At the Bonn Art and Exhibition Hall of the Federal Republic of Germany (also known as the Bundeskunsthalle) in 2018, Chachkhiani showed the disturbing story of a family in the short-film "Heavy Metal Honey". The film starts with a quiet family meeting and turns unreal when the mother starts shooting the family members. In the ending, everyone is sitting unharmed at the table.

== Solo exhibitions ==
- 2014 – Both, Museum of Contemporary Art (Siegen), Siegen, Germany
- 2017 – Living Dog Among Dead Lions, Georgian Pavillon, 57th Venice Biennale, Venice, Italy
- 2018 – Winter Which Was Not There, Turku Art Museum, Finland
- 2018 – Heavy Metal Honey, Bundeskunsthalle, Bonn
- 2018 – Flies bite, Its going to rain, Yarat Contemporary Art Space, Baku, Azerbaijan
- 2019 – Film, Berlinische Galerie, Berlin, Germany
- 2022 - The New Year, Pori Art Museum, Finland

== Collections ==
- Frac Auvergne, Clermont-Ferrand, France
- Han Nefkens Foundation, Barcelona, Spain
- Museum of Contemporary Art (Siegen), Siegen, Germany

== Awards ==
- 2013 – DAAD-award, Bonn, Germany
- 2014 – 7th Rubens Promotional Award, Museum für Gegenwartskunst, Siegen, Germany
- 2015 – Arbeitsstipendium, Stiftung Kunstfonds, Bonn, Germany
- 2017 – Future Generation Art Prize 2017, PinchukArtCentre, Kyiv, Ukraine
- 2019 – One of 4 recipients of a Villa Aurora fellowship for visual arts, Los Angeles, USA
