= Kipke =

Kipke is a surname. Notable people with the surname include:

- Harry Kipke (1899–1972), American football, basketball, and baseball player and coach
- Nic Kipke (born 1979), American politician
- Željko Kipke (born 1953), Croatian artist
