= Aiko Miyanaga =

Japanese sculptor (born 1974)

- Born: 1974 (age 51–52); Kyoto, Japan
- Education: Kyoto University of Art and Design; Tokyo National University of Fine Arts and Music
- Known for: Sculpture and installation works
- Notable work: Aiko Miyanaga : strata, origins
- Style: Contemporary art
- Awards: Nissan Art Award

Aiko Miyanaga (born 1974) is a contemporary Japanese artist known for sculpture and installation works that give visual form to time by revealing the evidential traces of its passing. Miyanaga has made many works using naphthalene which leads to the disintegration of the work over time.

== Early life and education ==
Aiko Miyanaga was born in 1974 into a family of potters in Kyoto, Japan, heir to the Miyanaga Tozan kiln. Miyanaga's father is a ceramic artist and a former member of the now disbanded avant-garde modern Japanese ceramics collective Sodeisha.

She went to school at Kyoto University of Art and Design and Tokyo National University of Fine Arts and Music graduating in 2008.

== Exhibitions ==
In 2014, Miyanaga presented a work entitled "Soramimimisora (Hearing Things)", a sound installation employing ceramics.

In 2015, Miyanaga took part in an exhibition inside the exclusion zone near the Fukushima Daiichi Nuclear Power Plant along with Ai Weiwei, Taryn Simon, Meiro Koizumi, Takekawa Nobuaki, Ahmet Öğüt and Trevor Paglen. The exhibition was not accessible by anyone during the exhibition dates due to unsafe levels of radioactivity in the area

Miyanaga was in a two-person show with Albert Yonathan Setyawan in 2018 at Mizuma Gallery, Singapore

In 2019, Miyanaga created an installation called "Hair Salon Kotobuki" for Setouchi Triennale in the Seto Inland Sea.

In 2020, Miyanaga featured in an exhibition titled "New View" at Art Gallery Artium, Fukuoka

In 2020, Miyanaga was due to exhibit at the 2020 Tokyo Biennale, before it was postponed to 2021 following the COVID-19 pandemic.

In 2021, she displayed her work at the Northern Alps Art Festival.

== Awards and fellowships ==
Among the honors which Miyanaga has earned are:

22nd Gotoh Memorial Foundation New Artist Award in 2011

Grand Prize at Nissan Art Award 2013

== Books ==
- Aiko Miyanaga : strata, origins (2014)
- Aiko Miyanaga - Nakasora The Reason For Eternity (2012)
