= Banu Cennetoğlu =

Turkish artist (born 1970)

- Born: 1970 (age 55–56); Ankara
- Notable work: The List (2007-Present)

Banu Cennetoğlu (b. Ankara, 1970) is a visual artist based in Istanbul. She uses photography, installation, and printed matter to explore the classification, appropriation and distribution of data and knowledge. Her work deals with listings, collections, rearrangements, and archives. She is the founding director of BAS, an Istanbul-based artist-run initiative that collects and displays artists’ books and printed material as artwork. In Turkey, she is "best known as an apostle of the artist’s book.".

== Education ==
Cennetoğlu received a BA in psychology and then studied photography in Paris. From 1996 to 2002, she lived in New York where she worked on documentary and fashion photography for publications such as Purple and Self Service. In 2002, she moved to Amsterdam where she studied a.o. at the Rijksakademie van beeldende kunsten and got involved with artists' books. In 2005, she moved back to Turkey. In 2016, she was a guest at the DAAD Artists-in-Berlin Program.

== Selected works ==
=== BAS, 2006-ongoing ===
In 2006, Cennetoğlu initiated an artist-run project called BAS, which roughly translates as "print". The space currently hosts a collection of artists' books and ephemera on permanent display, which has grown from her own collection. The collection comprises three main categories: artists' publications, periodicals, and project publications with an online inventory. The artists' books in the collection are produced in large editions and circulate outside of mainstream art channels. This can be considered as an extension of her artistic research on the collection, organization, and dissemination of information. To develop the BAS Collection, Cennetoğlu prioritizes diversity over personal taste as she has an open acquisition policy when buying, accepting, and bartering artists' books. The collection is open to the public. BAS has hosted exhibitions, including Masist Gül (2011); Artists' books from Georgia and BAS Collection (2011); KORIDOR 1988–1995 (2010); Artists' books by Sol LeWitt (2009), and more.

In 2014, collectorspace, an Istanbul-based nonprofit, collaborated with Cennetoğlu and the BAS Collection to work on an exhibition with a newspaper project borrowed from the collection, titled Corrections and Clarifications (2001–ongoing) by artist Anita Di Bianco.

Alongside BAS, Cennetoğlu collaborated with artist Philippine Hoegen to establish Bent, the publishing project that focused on commissioning artists' books by artists from Turkey. The first publication was Pavement Myth-The Life of the Pavement’s Wolf (1, 2, 3, 4, 5, 6) by Masist Gül, followed by artists' books Takip/Poursuite (2006) by Aslı Çavuşoğlu, Bent003 by Emre Hüner, Sahil Sahnesi Sesi (2008) Cevdet Erek, KILAVUZ (2009) by the artist collective Atılkunst, among others.

=== The List, 2007–ongoing ===
Since 2007, Cennetoğlu has been developing The List in collaboration with UNITED for Intercultural Action, an Amsterdam-based network and NGO in support of migrants and refugees. The work is a collection of data about thousands of immigrants, asylum seekers, and refugees who died on their way to or at the border of the European Union since 1993. It is presented in multiple forms, including posters, billboards, newspaper supplements, and public screens, in various cities including Amsterdam, Athens, Basel, Istanbul, Sofia, Bonn, Milano, Los Angeles, Berlin, London, and Liverpool.The List featured data about 7,128 individuals when first exhibited in Amsterdam in 2007. As of May 2018, it includes 34,361 cases. Cennetoğlu does not consider the project "an art piece"; she does not edition it, sell it or sign it. Although she doesn't consider this project an artwork, she acknowledges a connection between The List and her artistic practice, as her artworks deal with witness-bearing. This work exemplifies how Cennetoğlu assumes different positions such as caretaker and a facilitator—not only an author—when she deals with lists and archives.

"Governments don’t keep these record for the public; they don’t want the public to see these records because it exposes their policies, so you have NGOs trying to put data together, and that data is incomplete and fragile, but there again someone has to do it. And I want to contribute to that with what I have and what I do—but not by aestheticizing it. You cannot represent this kind of darkness through art."

The 2017 edition was distributed as an insert in Tagesspiegel Berlin. The 2018 edition was printed and distributed as a supplement by The Guardian in a print run of 210,000 on World Refugee Day, June 20, 2018. Subsequently, it was exhibited in the form of posters at Great George Street in Liverpool as part of the Liverpool Biennial 2018 and in conjunction with Cennetoğlu's solo exhibition at Chisenhale Gallery, London. On August 1, 2018, the posters in Liverpool were anonymously destroyed and removed. Some suggested that a council worker may have mistaken the work as an illegal poster and taken it down, but a spokesperson from the city council refused the allegation. The work was reinstalled on August 5, 2018, but was vandalised again shortly afterwards. Cennetoğlu left these damaged posters in place as a visual representation of the lack of empathy that originally instigated the creation of the work.

Frieze named the work No.18 of "The 25 Best Works of the 21st Century".

=== CATALOG 2009, 2009 ===
As part of Lapses, the two-artist exhibition (with Ahmet Öğüt) curated by Başak Şenova for the Pavilion of Turkey at the 53rd International Venice Biennale, Cennetoğlu produced CATALOG 2009 (2009), a book that mimics the format of a mail-order catalog, comprising 450 photographs organized in fifteen categories inspired by stock photography: composition, color, assumption, negotiation, operation, vanity, adjustment, excursion, caution, love, seizure, exploit, act, invasion and replacement. Cennetoğlu created subjective categories to organize her photographs along with a few found photographs, challenging the assumed hierarchies of value. For the duration of the exhibition in Venice, the viewers were encouraged to order and download the featured photographs from the Internet free or charge.

=== 04.09.2014, 2014 ===
In the early 2010s, Cennetoğlu started creating bound collections of daily newspapers printed in one day and has produced different editions of this work in several countries, including Turkey, Switzerland, and Germany. The work offers a juxtaposition of information in an unconventional way, and questions the politics of representation through print media. The artist calls it a "re-contextualization" of the newspaper and "an almost monumentalization" as the archiving of printed matter is meant to be temporary.

=== Gurbet's Diary, 2017 ===
Commissioned by documenta14, Gurbet's Diary is a work that comprises 82,661 words in mirror image placed on 145 press-ready lithographic limestone slabs. It draws from Gurbet's Diary. I Engraved My Heart into the Mountains by Gurbetelli Ersöz, first published in 1998 by Mezopotamien Verlag, Neuss. Ersöz was a chemist turned editor turned guerrilla—a Kurdish fighter who kept a journal as an act of resistance between 1995 and 1997. In her diary, she writes about her experience as a fighter as well as her observations in nature, poetry she likes, and the difference between being an intellectual and a fighter. She was killed in 1997. As part of the exhibition in Kassel, Cennetoğlu also created a related work, replacing the usual inscription of "Museum Fridericianum" with "Being safe is scary"—as a tribute to Ersöz.

=== 1 January 1970 – 21 March 2018 · H O W B E I T · Guilty feet have got no rhythm · Keçiboynuzu · AS IS · MurMur · I measure every grief I meet · Taq u Raq · A piercing Comfort it affords · Stitch · Made in Fall · Yes. But. We had a golden heart. · One day soon I’m gonna tell the moon about the crying game, 2018 ===
Cennetoğlu's most recent work is a 128 hours and 22 minutes long film work that comprises an unedited archive of all the digital images the artist has amassed between June 2006 and March 2018. The film features all the photographs and videos the artist took, the images she received on his phone and email, all of her video works, their documentation, exhibitions, as well as images from her private life. Considered as an act of "vulnerability and rebelliousness", the work is an investigation of collective histories through the images the artist has collected over 12 years. The title was inspired by Clarice Lispector's The Hour of the Star, a novel with thirteen subtitles separated by or's.

== Exhibitions ==
Cennetoğlu co-represented Turkey at the 53rd International Venice Biennale with Ahmet Öğüt in 2009.

In February 2024, Cennetoğlu, alongside artist Pilvi Takala, released a statement regarding her decision to join Strike Germany and withdraw from her solo exhibition at Neuer Berliner Kunstverein e.V., which was scheduled to open in June 2024. The artists cited that the institution "declined to accommodate an artistic gesture we proposed, which aimed to align with the collective solidarity with Palestine."

The artist is represented by Rodeo Gallery, based in London and Piraeus.

List of Exhibitions
Year	Title	Institution	Location	Ref.
2003		Berlin Biennial	Berlin	
2007		10th Istanbul Biennial	Istanbul	
2007		1st Athens Biennale	Athens	
2007		Walker Art Center	Minneapolis	
2008		3rd Berlin Biennale	Berlin	
2009	The Pavilion of Turkey	53rd Venice Biennale		
2010		Manifesta 8	Murcia	
2011		Kunsthalle Basel	Basel	
2013	Frozen Lakes	Artist's Space	New York	
2014	Burning Down The House	10th Gwangju Biennale	Gwangju	
2015		Bonner Kunstverein	Bonn	
2016	… und eine Welt noch	Kunsthaus Hamburg	Hamburg	
2017	It is Obvious from the Map	Redcat	Los Angeles	
2017	The Restless Earth	Fondazione Nicola Trussardi	Milan	
2017		documenta14	Athens and Kassel	
2017	3rd Berlin Herbstsalon	Maxim Gorki Theater	Berlin	
2018		Liverpool Biennial	Liverpool	
2018	Stories of Almost Everyone	Hammer Museum	Los Angeles	
2018		Chisenhale Gallery	London	
2019		Ständehaus, Kunstsammlung Nordrhein-Westfallen	Düsseldorf	
2019		SculptureCenter	New York	
2020		Kunsthalle Wien	Vienna	
2022		Musée cantonal des Beaux-arts	Lausanne	
2026		Kanal – Centre Pompidou	Brussels	
