= Venezuelan pavilion =

Venice Biennale national pavilion

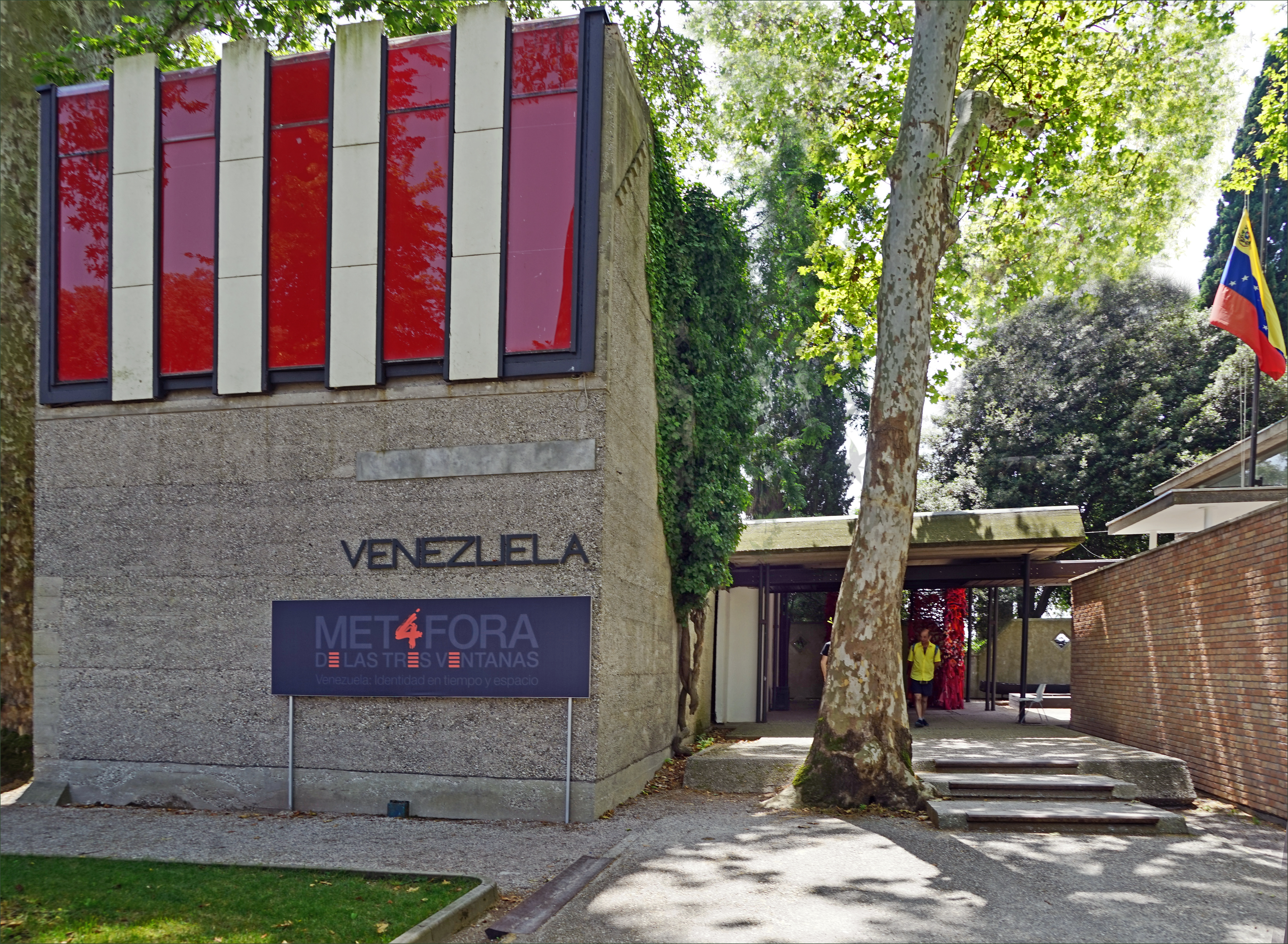
The Venezuelan Pavilion

The Venezuelan pavilion houses Venezuela's national representation during the Venice Biennale arts festivals. It is located in the Giardini della Biennale.

== Background ==
The Venice Biennale is an international art biennial exhibition held in Venice, Italy. Often described as "the Olympics of the art world", participation in the Biennale is a prestigious event for contemporary artists. The festival has become a constellation of shows: a central exhibition curated by that year's artistic director, national pavilions hosted by individual nations, and independent exhibitions held throughout Venice. The Biennale's parent organisation also runs regular festivals in other arts: architecture, dance, film, music and theatre.

Outside the central international exhibition, individual nations produce their own shows, known as pavilions, as their national representation. Nations that own their pavilion buildings – such as the 30 housed in the Giardini – are responsible for their own upkeep and construction costs as well. Nations without dedicated buildings create pavilions in venues throughout the city.

== Organization and building ==
The Biennale began in 1895. When it resumed after a break caused by World War II, Venezuela was invited to participate. The government of Marcos Pérez Jiménez agreed to fund a national pavilion, the first for a Latin American country. Designed by the Italian architect Carlo Scarpa, it was built between 1953 and 1956.

== Representation by year ==
=== Art ===
- 1954 — Armando Reverón
- 1956 — Mateo Manaure
- 1958 — Régulo Pérez
- 1960 — Hector Poleo
- 1962 — Oswaldo Vigas
- 1964 — Jesús Rafael Soto
- 1970 — Carlos Cruz-Diez
- 1978 — Luisa Richter
- 1976 — Alirio Rodríguez
- 1980 — Oswaldo Subero
- 1988 — Jacobo Borges
- 1990 — Julio Pacheco Rivas
- 1995 — Meyer Vaisman
- 1999 — Victor Lucena
- 2005 — Santiago Pol (Commissioner: Vivian Rivas Gingerich)
- 2007 — Antonio Briceño, Vincent & Feria (Commissioner: Zuleiva Vivas)
- 2009 — Claudio Perna, Antonieta Sosa, Alejandro Otero
- 2011 — Francisco Bassim, Clemencia Labin, Yoshi (Curator: Luis Hurtado)
- 2013 — Colectivo de Artistas Urbanos Venezolanos (Curator: Juan Calzadilla)
- 2015 — Argelia Bravo, Félix Molina (Flix) (Curator: Oscar Sotillo Meneses)
- 2017 — Juan Calzadilla

== Bibliography ==
- Russeth, Andrew (April 17, 2019). "The Venice Biennale: Everything You Could Ever Want to Know". ARTnews.
- Volpi, Cristiana (2013). "Venezuela". In Re Rebaudengo, Adele (ed.). Pavilions and Garden of Venice Biennale. Rome: Contrasto. p. 186. ISBN 978-88-6965-440-4.
