= Ivana Franke =

Croatian contemporary visual artist (born 1957)

- Born: 21 December 1973 (age 52); Zagreb, SR Croatia, Yugoslavia
- Occupation: Contemporary visual artist
- Known for: Large scale spatial and light installations; spatial drawings
- Notable work: Full Empty Space, 2001; Latency, 2007; Seeing with Eyes Closed, 2011–; Retreat into Darkness. Towards a Phenomenology of the Unknown, 2017; Resonance of the Unforeseen, 2020; Limits of Perception Lab, 2020–

Ivana Franke (born 21 December 1973) is a Croatian contemporary visual artist who currently lives and works in Berlin, Germany.

She uses light, space and transparent materials to create immersive installations and spatial drawings that appear ephemeral, elusive, fragile and intangible, and ultimately confront people with the limits of their perception.

== Education and artistic career ==
Ivana Franke was born in Zagreb, Croatia, at the time it was part of the former Yugoslavia. She graduated at the School of Contemporary Dance and Rhythmics and Graphic Arts at the Academy of Fine Arts in Zagreb, 1992–1997, under Professor Miroslav Šutej, a member of the New Tendencies, the neo-avant garde movement that influenced her work. In 2001-2002 she participated in the fellowship program of the Center for Contemporary Art Kitakyushu, Japan. In 2004 she was a fellow of the Nordic Institut for Contemporary Art (NIFCA) in Helsinki. In 2009-2010 she was a grantee of the Institut für Raumexperimente and in 2014 she was a resident of ISGM, Gardner Museum in Boston.

In June 2024 she was elected associate member of the Croatian Academy of Sciences and Arts.

Her first solo exhibition took place in Nova Gallery in Zagreb in 1997. She received wider recognition in New York MoMA P.S.1 2001 special project program with her ephemeral installation Full Empty Space. In 2007 Franke represented Croatia at the 52nd Venice Biennale with the multi-part site-specific exhibition Latency in Palazzo Querini Stampalia.

Her large scale installations have been featured in many other international biennials, such as kinetic installation Frameworks at 9th Venice Biennale of Architecture, 2004, site-specific installation Liminal Level, 2008 in Manifesta 7 in Bolzano, architectural installation Disorientation Station at 11th Shanghai Biennale in 2016 and Resonance of the Unforeseen in 2020 at 9th Yokohama Triennale, among others.

== Work ==
Ivana Franke's practice is driven by philosophical questions about the nature of reality, about the relationship between appearances - subjective experience of how things manifest in our perception and thought, in phenomenal consciousness - and materiality - how things are according to physics or science in general -. She builds complex geometric structures/sculptures often employing transparent materials. By sophisticated use of light and space she modulates their appearance and devises situations that address visual and spatial perception to 'question their epistemological power'.

In her immersive time-based light installations, the materiality of geometric sculptures is often negated and sometimes those constructions are made completely invisible. Instead, those structures serve as a background, a three-dimensional screen for rendering and reflecting light, hosting secondary perceptual "objects", made of light reflections, which as such do not exist, but are inferred in the mind of the observer. Animated Sphere, 2008, a geodesic sphere interwoven with more than four thousands of thin lines of monofilament is illuminated by tiny incandescent bulb which reflects itself on each of those thousands of lines, but does not shed enough light to make the spherical construction visible. Those constellations of reflected light dots, immaterial objects and fleeting phenomena are animated by the observer, move with him/her; they are experienced as ultimately subjective, transient, elusive, fragile and intangible.

=== Full Empty Space, 2001 ===
In tradition of light and space artists, Ivana Franke uses light and light reflections to transform architectural elements in all-encompassing light installations, however her artistic practice differs crucially from that of Turrell or Eliasson, for example, in that she attaches so much importance to her "via negativa", that is, the possibility of defining the meaning of the work as a function of the non-existent.

In her installation Full Empty Space in MoMA PS1 in New York, 2001, she has filled almost an entire room with fishing line and adhesive tape suspended to form structures with three x,y,z axes, the multiple origins of Cartesian lines that start forming space but never define it completely. With those dematerialised, almost invisible structures, she points to the "materiality" of spatial emptiness and light. A visitor is invited to enter the room, but the fragility and invisibility of the structure questions the mere ability to control space that we easily take for granted. In her following installation Prostor, 2003, in Museum of Contemporary Art, Zagreb, the ambience was created by measuring and multiplying a multitude of spatial units drawn in space with threads of transparent fishing line stretched over the three walls of the room, so that the entrance itself was blocked for the visitor and opened only to take over the screen function. However, the paradox is that the network exists, since we have already mentioned it as a tangible obstacle, but it is at no point as such fully visible. Light, which implies the possibility of a visual representation of the world, is not rendered by transparent threads of fishing lines, and almost completely dematerializes white space, making it intangible and invisible.

=== Latency, 2007 ===
In 2007 Ivana Franke represented Croatia at the 9th Venice Biennale with multi-part architecture-related exhibition Latency situated in the Area Scarpa of Pallazo Querini Stampalia. In the central installation Latency (Sala Luzzato) she covered walls and the floor with transparent glossy acryl glass which enabled the daylight, garden and the water to enter the space in the form of reflected unstable images, while the actual Scarpa's architecture remained visible in the background. Remaining three rooms were deprived of daylight and transformed into something evading and fragile – something that ultimately eludes the pragmatism of early modernism.

With the similar intention of "moving into a historical location, and uncovering its invisible dimension", Franke's installation Entanglement is a Fragile State, 2012, a geometric structure, a woven linear wall made of semi transparent rope catching light from the windows in the Saint-Nicolas church in Caen in France, reveals the geometry and metaphysical significance of the late Romanesque architecture.

In Infinite Threshold, 2017, she installed a glossy foil on the floor of the Hamburger Bahnhof museum in Berlin, reflecting the light and images coming through the windows at the entrance of the space, which originally was the threshold to a train station.

=== Seeing with Eyes Closed, 2011- ===
Seeing with Eyes Closed is an ongoing project dealing with quasi-hallucinatory flow of images behind user's closed eyes by stroboscopic light. Phenomena widely researched in neuroscience since beginning of 20th century and used for diagnosing photosensitive epilepsy, where Franke, an epileptic patient, first encountered it, as well used in art - Brion Gysin's Dreamachine. Fascinated by the character of the experience and the possibility of creating an artwork directly in the mind of the observer, Ivana Franke developed a series of installations of different spatial organisation and "internal movies" devised by programming flicker frequencies in sequences of different durations and customising lights.

Seeing with Eyes Closed, 2011, the first installation in the series is a curved object with screen of lights, in front of which the visitor sits on the cushion, and engages in an introvert, meditative individual experience. It has been widely shown internationally.

We close our eyes and see a flock of birds, 2013, commissioned by MONA and Sharjah Art Foundation, which accommodates five people at the same time offers a possibility of sharing experience with others, and primes the visitors with its title.

Disorientation Station (White), 2016, commissioned by the Shanghai Biennale is a large circular room with stroboscopic light wall accommodating larger number of people at the same time.

=== Retreat into Darkness. Towards a Phenomenology of the Unknown, 2017 ===
Ivana Franke has been continuously working with the minimisation of the sensory stimuli, in order to achieve the awareness of the process of perception as such. This has reached its culmination in installations that are operating out of the current "window of visibility" in perceived total darkness. In Towards a Phenomenology of the Unknown, she subjected the audience to total darkness in a room-filling installation in the Schering Stiftung. Visitors could not perceive the room's architecture or any objects within it, and they did not know what to expect. This was an intensely physical experience, and people often reacted with fear. They needed five to ten minutes for their eyes to adjust before they could begin to perceive the points of light hovering about the room. Even when the audience was able to make out the light sources after some time, the strings of light encircling the room remained a mystery.

In the iteration of this installation titled Lovers Seeing Darkness. Ubiety Unknown, 2018 in MACBA, the complexity of the slowly appearing figures has been increased by the use of time-based media - programmed choreography of the lights, increasing the vertigo.

Other Franke's installations in complete darkness include Waver, in Circles and Instants of Visibility, 2009, In the Faraway Past and in the Future and From the Faraway Past and From the Future, 2014, Travel Along Unknown, 2020.

=== Resonance of the Unforeseen, 2020 ===
Commissioned for the Yokohama Triennale 2020 under Raqs Media Collective's curatorship, Resonance of the Unforeseen was a monumental public art project wrapping the entire front façade of the Yokohama Museum of Art. In a certain distance the building seemed to disappear under the grey material, but as you got closer it seemed to come to life at the breeze, thanks to the subtle moiré effect of the mesh.

=== Limits of Perception Lab, 2020- ===
Ivana Franke's exhibition Your Country of Two Dimensions is Not Spacious Enough. Limits of Perception Lab in Savvy Contemporary in Berlin, 2020, focused on multidimensionality and included a "laboratory" for possible exploration of the phenomenal experiences of the voluntary participants, employing 5-D altered states of consciousness questionnaire.

Multidisciplinary practice of employing visual/spatial phenomena used in her artworks for quasi-scientific practice of employing visual/spatial phenomena used in her artworks for quasi-scientific experiments - the experiments use scientific methodology in artist's devised setups - investigating perceptual and cognitive processes during exposure to those stimuli has been part of her practice since 2009, such as hallucinatory responses to flickering light in installations Seeing with Eyes Closed, with neuroscientist Ida Momennejad and impossible objects produced by specular highlights - reflections of light on monofilament structures with vision scientist Bilge Sayim.

In this context and in conjunction with her art projects, a number of interdisciplinary events took place to further the inquiry into the themes, from different angles by experts from the fields of neuroscience, vision science, psychology, physics, history of science, critical theory and arts, including Seeing with Eyes Closed in Peggy Guggenheim in Venice (2011), at Deutsche Guggenheim in Berlin (2012), in Lauba in Zagreb (2012), Towards a Phenomenology of the Unknown in Silent Green presented in Lange Nacht der Wissenschaften in Schering Stiftung Berlin (2017), and Limits of Perception Lab, Summer Solstice Invocations, online event organised by Savvy Contemporary in Berlin in 2020.

=== Collaborations ===
Ivana Franke co-authored several artworks with other artists and architects, including Frameworks, a kinetic installation first exhibited at the 9th Venice Architecture Biennale in 2004, installed permanently in front of the Museum of Contemporary Art in Zagreb, with architects Petar Mišković, Lea Pelivan and Tomo Plejić.

In 2019 together with architects Tommi Grönlund / Petteri Nisunen she realised the installation Imminence, shown in the Museum of Modern and Contemporary Art in Rijeka and subsequently in Anhava Gallery in Helsinki in 2020, and public light installation Time Slip, under the Titov Bridge in Rijeka, both as part of Rijeka European Capital of Culture 2020 project

In 2005 she collaborated on the exhibition Izbjegavanje / Avoid, in the Museum of Contemporary Art in Zagreb with artists Silvio Vujicić and Damir Ocko, in 2015 on Srebrenica 1995-2015, an audio-visual event commemorating 20 years from Srebrenica genocide in collaboration with Carl Michael von Hausswolff

=== Spatial Drawings ===
Although known for her large scale spatial and light installations, Ivana Franke is also recognized for drawings and objects investigating concepts, visualisations and perception of spatial dimensions, and perceptual multistability. In the series of transparent acrylic glass three-dimensional objects Frame of Reference, 2006, she created a perceptual loss of dimension appearance of two-dimensional drawings. The animated drawings in her artist flip book 2-3D, 2004, reproducing Necker cube on transparent foil in a series of four-dimensional sections in five-dimensional space questions relationship of our physical vs. mental space where the perceptual dimensionality flips. In the exhibition Potential Degrees of Freedom, 2014, in Richter Collection, Museum of Contemporary Art, Zagreb, she employs projection of Tesseract - hypercube - silkscreened on translucent paper which opens two dimensionality of the drawing into space. The apparently hypnotic lace-like mandalas of Planetary Nebula, 2019, are drawn from renderings of complex higher dimensional polyhedra, and in Entrance to Six-dimensional Cellar, 2019, a projection of six-dimensional cube printed on the floor creates an imaginary habitable space with an entrance. Further developed into often linear spatial drawings, three-dimensional objects and installations such as Room for Running Ghosts, 2011, a large scale sculpture where tensegrity-based structure points to perception of immateriality, Light Carpet, 2010, relief made of layers of geometric glass sheets embedded into the floor and Traces of Elsewhere, 2018, necker cube based wall relief with positive-negative inversions operating on perceptual multi-stability.

== Collections ==
Her works are represented in public collections including Barcelona Museum of Contemporary Art, MACBA, Museum of Contemporary Art in Zagreb, Museum of Modern and Contemporary Art, Rijeka, Filip Trade Collection of Contemporary Art, Zagreb. In 2013, a series of five prints was purchased from the artist by the European Parliament for its Art Collection.
