= Gurbetelli Ersöz =

Chemist, Kurdish journalist

Gurbetelli Ersöz (1965, Palu, Elazığ– 8 October 1997, South Kurdistan) was a chemist, journalist and later also member of the Kurdistan Workers' Party (PKK).

== Biography ==
Gurbetelli was born in Palu, Elazığ, and studied chemistry at the University. Later she worked as an assistant at the Çukurova University. As a chemist, she calls the Chernobyl catastrophe of 1986 and the chemical attack in Halabja in 1988 two major events turning points in her life. Following, she began to get involved politically, she wanted to make a change. Due to her political activities, she was arrested in 1990, and prosecuted and sentenced for supporting the PKK. She stayed in prison for two years. After her release, she became the editor-in-chief of Özgür Gündem, a newspaper which showed the Kurdish side of the Kurdish-Turkish conflict. But her tenure was short-lived as she was detained with 107 other people during a search of the newspapers headquarters in Istanbul on the 10 December 1993. Eventually she was arrested on the 12 January 1994. During the trial the prosecutor demanded up to 15 years imprisonment. Gurbetelli and the other prosecuted journalists were supported by the Committee to Protect Journalists and writers like Harold Pinter or Noam Chomsky. She was sentenced to 3 Years and 9 months imprisonment but released in June 1994. After she was not allowed no work as a journalist, she joined the PKK in 1995. She was killed in combat on the 8 October 1997.

A case was opened at the European Court of Human Rights in 1998 mentioning her together with other former staff members of Özgür Gündem. The court decided not to consider her being a applicant to the court as she has died in 1997.

== Legacy ==
Gurbetelli is seen as a proficient journalist in the Kurdish society and within the Musa Anter and Free Press Martyrs Journalism Awards of the Free Journalists Association of Turkey, there exists a Gurbetelli Award in her memory. To the award ceremony of 2016, several politicians of the Peoples Democratic Party (HDP) attended. The Press Academy of the PKK also bears her name. The visual artist Banu Cennetoğlu presented an art work about her diary at the Documenta 14 in Athens. Her diary was published in Germany in 1998 and called I Engraved My Heart into the Mountains and in 2014 the book was also published in Turkey, but soon after the book was banned by the Turkish authorities.
