= Ahmet Öğüt =

Turkish-Dutch artist

Ahmet Öğüt (born 1981 in Diyarbakır, Turkey) is a Kurdish conceptual artist living and working in Amsterdam, Netherlands and Istanbul. He works with a broad range of media including video, photography, installation, drawing, painting and printed media.

== Education ==
Ahmet Öğüt received his BA from the Fine Arts Faculty of Hacettepe University, Ankara, in 2003, and his MFA from the Art and Design Faculty of Yıldız Technical University in Istanbul, Turkey, in 2006. Öğüt has been a guest artist at the Rijksakademie van Beeldende Kunsten in Amsterdam in 2007–2008.

== Career ==
In 2009, Ahmet Öğüt represented Turkey with Banu Cennetoğlu at the 53rd Venice Biennale in Venice, Italy.

He is the founder of 'The Silent University', a programme for and with asylum seekers, refugees and migrants to give and take courses. Parts of the participative project were hosted between 2012 and 2013 at Tate Modern, Delfina Foundation, and The Showroom in London, UK.

In 2020, Öğüt had a solo exhibition at Yarat Contemporary Art Space in Baku, Azerbaijan. Due to the institution's use of the exhibition banner as a propaganda means in the Nagorno-Karabakh conflict, he asked for his exhibition to be taken down.

== Teaching ==
Ahmet Öğüt has been a guest professor, tutor, advisor, and research teacher at several schools. Among the schools are Institut für Kunst im Kontext at Universität der Künste Berlin; Jan van Eyck Academie, Maastricht; Sandberg Institute Amsterdam; Finnish Academy of Fine Arts, Helsinki; TransArts - Transdisziplinäre Kunst, Institut für Bildende und Mediale Kunst Universität für angewandte Kunst Wien; and DAI (Dutch Art Institute) Arnhem.

Since 2021 Öğüt is guest professor at Universität der Künste Berlin at the Institut für Kunst im Kontext.

== Solo exhibitions ==
- 'Ahmet Öğüt', Mala Galerija / The Museum of Modern Art of Ljubljana, 2005
- 'Ahmet Öğüt and Borga Kantürk', Platform Garanti Contemporary Art Center, Istanbul, 2006
- 'Softly But Firmly', Galerija Miroslav Kraljevic, Zagreb, 2007
- 'Across the Slope', Centre d'Art Santa Mònica, Barcelona, 2008
- 'Mutual Issues, Inventive Acts', Kunsthalle Basel, 2008
- 'Things we count', Künstlerhaus Bremen, 2009
- 'Speculative Social Fantasies', Artspace, Sydney, 2010
- 'Ahmet Öğüt: No Protest Lost', curated by Henriette Bretton-Meyer, at Kunsthal Charlottenborg, Copenhagen, Denmark, 2017-2018
- 'Ahmet Öğüt: No poem loves its poet', curated by Mari Spirito, at Yarat Contemporary Art Space, Baku, Azerbaijan, 2020
- 'Jump up!', MoCA Skopje – Museum of Contemporary Art, Skopje, North Macedonia, 2022

== Group exhibitions ==
- 9th Istanbul Biennial, 2005
- 'Normalization', Rooseum Center for Contemporary Art, Malmö, 2006
- 1st Contemporary Art Biennale of Thessaloniki, 2007
- 'Stalking with Stories', Apexart, 2007
- 'Car Culture', Scottsdale Museum of Contemporary Art, 2008
- 'Be[com]ing Dutch', Van Abbemuseum, 2008
- 'Fuild Street', Kiasma Museum of Contemporary Art, 2008
- 5th Berlin Biennial, 2008
- 7th SITE Santa Fe Biennial, 2008
- 'The Generational', The New Museum of Contemporary Art, 2009
- 'Take the Money and Run', De Appel, Amsterdam, 2009
- 28th Biennial of Graphic Arts, Ljubljana, 2009
- 'Lapses', Turkish Pavilion, 53rd Venice Biennale, curated by Basak Senova, at the Arsenale, Venice, Italy, 2009

== Books ==
- Today in History (published by Book Works, London and Platform Garanti Contemporary Art Center, Istanbul, 2007) ISBN 978-1-906012-02-1
- Softly but Firmly (published by Galerija Miroslav Kraljevic, Zagreb, 2007) ISBN 978-3-86588-420-6
- On The Road to Other Lands (published by A Prior and 5th Berlin Biennial, 2008)
- Informal Incidents (published by art-ist contemporary art, Istanbul, 2008) ISBN 978-975-00290-5-9
