= Walid Siti =

Kurdish artist (born 1952)

Walid Siti (born 1952, Duhok, Iraqi Kurdistan) is a Kurdish painter and artist. He is currently based in London, United Kingdom.

== Education and early life ==
He was born into a family of a Sunni Muslim background and had four brothers and a sister. His father was involved in the Kurdish revolutionary movement and often in prison. The father was the breadwinner of his family and as his was often absent, he and his siblings had to work after school. His artistic skills have already raised some awareness in primary school, but weren't met with appraisal by the family at the time. Nevertheless, his father supported his desire to study art. He studied art at the Institute of Fine Arts in Baghdad from which he graduated in 1976. He then travelled to Yugoslavia (present day Slovenia) and where he studied graphic art between 1977 and 1982 at the Academy of Fine Arts in Ljubljana, from where he obtained a MSc. In 1984 he moved on to London due to the difficult situation in Baathist Iraq.

== Artistic career ==
He has developed a proficiency in several artistic fields like painting, printing and installations. Initially trained in artistic prints his artwork is now also including sketches and paintings. In his artistic artwork he lets himself get inspired by his cultural heritage of his homeland.

== Exhibitions ==
- 1987, Three Kurdish Artists, Kufa Gallery, London
- 1994, Timescapes, curated by Rose Issa, Leighton House Museum, London
- 2008, Land on Fire, curated by Rose Issa, Leighton House Museum, London
- 2011, The River Zei, Rose Issa Projects, London.
- 2012, Alienation, Barjeel Art Foundation, Saudi Arabia
- 2013, In Dialogue with Modhir Ahmed, Abdulrahim Sharif and Rashid bin Khalifa Al Khalifa at the Art Centre, Bahrain.
- 2017, The Black Tower, Zilberman Gallery, Berlin
