= Ruya Foundation =

Iraqi non-profit organization promoting contemporary art

- Ruya Foundation for Contemporary Culture in Iraq
- Formation: January 1, 2012; 14 years ago
- Founder: Tamara Chalabi, Reem Shather-Kubba, Shwan Ibrahim Taha
- Founded at: Baghdad, Iraq
- Type: Non-profit organization, Non-governmental organization
- Purpose: Promote contemporary culture and art in Iraq
- Location: Baghdad, Iraq
- Coordinates: 33.3152°N 44.3661°E
- Region served: Iraq
- Products: Art exhibitions, publications, artist support
- Methods: Exhibitions, publications, artist collaborations
- Fields: Contemporary culture, art
- Official language: Arabic, English
- Chair: Tamara Chalabi
- Website: Official Website

The Ruya Foundation, or Ruya Foundation for Contemporary Culture in Iraq, is an Iraqi registered not-for-profit, non-governmental organization. Founded in 2012, Ruya Foundation's board is made up of Tamara Chalabi (chair), Reem Shather-Kubba, and Shwan Ibrahim Taha.

== Exhibitions ==
Ruya Foundation's exhibition programme comprises work by Iraqi artists in a variety of media: sculpture, painting, installation, video and photography. The organisation does not have a permanent collection, but a revolving exhibition programme onsite at its Ruya Shop location on Mutanabbi Street, Baghdad.

Date	Exhibition	Artists
2013	Welcome to Iraq, curated by Jonathan Watkins	Abdul Raheem Yassir (b. 1951), Akeel Khreef (b. 1979), Ali Samiaa (b. 1980), Bassim Al-Shaker (b. 1986), Cheeman Ismaeel (b. 1966), Furat al Jamil (b. 1965), Hareth Alhomaam (b. 1987), Jamal Penjweny (b. 1981), Kadhim Nwir (b. 1967), Yaseen Wami (b. 1973), Hashim Taeeh
2015	Invisible Beauty, curated by Philippe Van Cauteren	Latif al-Ani, Akam Shex Hadi, Rabab Ghazoul, Salam Atta Sabri and Haider Jabbar.
2017	Archaic, curated by Tamara Chalabi and Paolo Colombo	Sherko Abbas, Sadik Kwaish Alfraji, Francis Alÿs, Ali Arkady, Luary Fadhil, Shakir Hassan Al Said, Nadine Hattom, Jawad Saleem, Sakar Sleman
2019	Fatherland: Serwan Baran, curated by Tamara Chalabi and Paolo Colombo	Serwan Baran (b. 1968)

== Projects ==
Ruya Foundation maintains a database of Iraqi artists.

The Foundation has published Ruya Notebooks since 2017. A monograph on the work of Iraqi photographer Latif al-Ani which they co-published won the Historical Book Award at Les Rencontres d’Arles in 2017.

== RUYA MAPS ==
In 2018, Ruya Foundation launched a sister organisation, RUYA MAPS. The UK registered charity was established to address specific needs, identified by the Ruya Foundation whilst carrying out its unique work in Iraq, that were found to be applicable internationally. It is led by Tamara Chalabi and has a programme of exhibitions, commissions and publications. RUYA MAPS hosted Venezuelan artist Pepe López's first solo in the UK, Crisálida, at Fitzrovia Chapel in 2017. They held an unofficial collateral exhibition at the 58th Venice Biennale, 'Heartbreak,' which featured artists from areas of conflict around the Mediterranean.
