= Waheeda Malullah =

- Born: August 19, 1978; Muharraq
- Occupation: Installation artist, photographer, painter, video artist

Waheeda Malullah (born August 19, 1978) is a Bahraini video and installation artist, photographer, and painter.

Waheeda Malullah was born on August 19, 1978 in Al-Muharraq. She graduated from the Regional Institute for Advertising and Marketing in 2002 with a degree in graphic design.

Much of her work explores gender roles in the Islamic world. In her installation Stopped Ball (2003) and her video Play! (2005), she inserts herself into games of the traditionally male sport of football. Women's hair is the subject of her With All Due Respect (2007) and Combing Hair (2008). Her work A Villager's Day Out (2008), which features photographs of a woman in a black abaya waking around Manama, explores themes of modernization and culture shock. It was included in Bahrain's pavilion at the 2013 Venice Biennale. In 2010, she returned to painting, producing colorful expressionist canvases. In 2016, she had a retrospective at the Bin Matar House in Muharraq.
