= Albert Yonathan Setyawan =

Albert Yonathan Setyawan (born in Bandung, Indonesia, 1983) is an Indonesian contemporary ceramic artist, living in Japan.

== Early life and education ==
Setyawan studied ceramics at Bandung Institute of Technology (ITB) and Kyoto Seika University.

== Work ==
Setyawan's work investigates the transitory nature of existence. Setyawan works mainly with ceramics, as well as video, installation, drawing and performance.

In his ceramic work, he produces hundreds or thousands of organic or geometric forms by hand that are installed on walls or floors—”exalted aggregations” that resemble labyrinths or mandalas.

Setyawan's use of repetition through aesthetic forms as well as the repetitive labor of the handmade slip-casting process emphasize a meditative aspect in his work, which he relates back to factory-produced ceramics where slip-casting is used.

== Exhibitions ==
Setyawan was one of five artists exhibited in the Indonesian pavilion at the 55th Venice Biennale in 2013

Setyawan was featured in the Sunshower exhibition at Mori Art Museum in 2017

Pola Museum Annex held a solo show of Setyawan’s works in 2017

His work featured at Echigo Tsumari Art Field in 2018

Setyawan was in a two-person show with Aiko Miyanaga in 2018 at Mizuma Gallery, Singapore His work was included in the Contemporary Worlds exhibition at National Gallery Australia in 2019
