= Rashid Rana =

Contemporary painter and artist from Pakistan

- Born: Lahore, Pakistan
- Occupation: Visual artist
- Website: rashidrana.com

Rashid Rana (Urdu: راشد رانا) is a Pakistani artist. He participated in numerous exhibitions, both in Pakistan and abroad while working on themes like urbanization, faith, and tradition on canvas, billboards, digital media and more.

== Life ==
Rashid Rana was born in Lahore, Pakistan. He received a Bachelor of Fine Arts from the National College of Arts in Lahore, Pakistan in 1992, and a Master of Fine Arts from the Massachusetts College of Art in Boston, Massachusetts, US in 1994. He is currently Dean and one of the founding faculty members of the School of Visual Arts and Design (SVAD), Beaconhouse National University, Lahore.

== Art career ==
Utilizing mediums such as painting, video, installation, and photography, Rana's works deal with everyday issues encompassing such themes as urbanization, faith, and tradition.

His mentor is Zahoor ul Akhlaq.

His recent international exhibitions include:

- Solo Exhibition, Lisson Gallery, London
- Perpetual Paradox Solo Exhibition at Musée Guimet, Paris, France (2010)
- Where dreams Cross: 150 years of photography from India, Pakistan, and Bangladesh, to the Fotomuseum Winterthur in Switzerland, and Whitechapel Gallery, London, UK
- The Empire Strikes Back; India Art Today, Saatchi Gallery (2010), The Power of Ornament, Lower Belvedere, Vienna.

Dis-Location (2007), a major solo in a range of media showing his selected works spread across two galleries, including Gallery Chemould Prescott, marked his return to Mumbai after a gap of three years. Underlining the artist's notability on the global art stage, an accompanying note said: "He has come to represent an entire generation of Pakistani Contemporary Artists. Moreover, in the Indian art scene, he is the first artist from across the border to have been thoroughly embraced since the partition era artists such as Abdul Rehman Chughtai and Allah Bux. Working both on major public installations as well as gallery-based works, his art is now some of the most recognizable among artists from South Asia".

An edition of Red Carpet-1 was sold at Sotheby's New York in 2008 for $623,000, at the time the highest price paid for a work by a Pakistani artist.

=== 2011 ===
- Rashid Rana, Lisson Gallery, London
- Art Dubai, Chemould Prescott Road + Chatterjee & Lal, Dubai
- Collectors' Stage: Asian Contemporary Art from Private Collections, Singapore Art Museum, Singapore.
- The Rising Tide: New Directions in the Art from Pakistan 1990–2010, Mohatta Palace Museum, Karachi.

=== 2010 ===
- Perpetual Paradoxes, Musée Guimet, Paris
- Finding India: Exhibition of Contemporary Indian Art, Museum of Contemporary Art, Taipei
- Where Dreams Cross: 150 Years of Photography from India, Pakistan and Bangladesh, Fotomuseum, Winterthur
- Where Dreams Cross: 150 Years of Photography from India, Pakistan and Bangladesh, Whitechapel Gallery, London
- Beyond the Page – The Miniature as Attitude in Contemporary Art from Pakistan, Pacific Asia Museum, Pasadena
- The Empire Strikes Back: Indian Art Today, Saatchi Gallery, London

=== 2009 ===
- Art Basel, Chemould Prescott Road, Miami
- Living off the Grid, Anant Art Centre, New Delhi
- View Points and Viewing Points: Asian Art Biennial, National Fine Arts Museum, Taichung
- Hanging Fire: Contemporary Art from Pakistan, Asia Society, New York
- The 21st Century, the Feminine Century, and the Century of Diversity and Hope, Incheon Biennale, Incheon
- Mashq: Repetition Meditation Mediation, Green Cardamom, London
- How Nations Are Made, Cartwright Hall, Bradford
- Starring the Artist, Indus Valley School of Art and Architecture, Karachi
- The Power of Ornament, Orangery, Lower Belvedere, Vienna
- Lines of Control (travelling exhibition), Third Line gallery, Dubai; V.M. Gallery, Karachi; Green Cardamom, London

=== 2008 ===
- Hong Kong Art Fair, Chemould Prescott Road + Chatterjee & Lal, Hong Kong
- Critical Studio: Dialogue with South Asian Artists, Macy Gallery, Columbia University, New York
- Everywhere is War (and Rumors of War), Bodhi Art, Mumbai
- Passage to India, Frank Cohen Collection, Initial Access, West Midlands
- Re-Imaging Asia, House of World Cultures, Berlin

=== 2007 ===
- Solo show, Art Public – Cabinet P.H., Geneva
- Dis-Location, Chemould Prescott Road + Chatterjee & Lal, Mumbai
- Reflected Looking, Nature Morte, New Delhi
- Shanghai Contemporary, Best of Discovery, Nature Morte, Shanghai Exhibition Center, Shanghai
- Face East: Contemporary Asian Portraiture, Wedel Fine Art, London
- Moving Ahead, National Art Gallery, Islamabad
- Group show: Contemporary Art from Pakistan, Thomas Erben Gallery, New York
- The Politics of Fear, Albion, London
- Mirror Worlds, Two Rooms, Auckland

=== 2006 ===
- 5th Asia Pacific Triennale, Queensland Gallery of Art, Queensland
- EX-OTICA, Gallery Vitamin, Turin
- Artissima Art Fair, Turin
- Grid <>Matrix, Kemper Art Museum, St Louis
- Lille 3000: Desi Pop, Lille
- 1st Singapore Biennale, Singapore
- Beyond the Page: Contemporary Art from Pakistan, Asia House, London; Manchester Art Gallery, Manchester
- Asian Contemporary Art Week, Asia Society, Gallery Korea, New York
- Flights of Fancy, Royaat Gallery, Lahore
- Mirror Worlds: (travelling exhibition), Institute of Modern Art, Brisbane
- Parallel Realities: 3rd Fukuoka Triennale, Blackburn Museum of Art, Blackburn

=== 2005 ===
- Identical Views, Chatterjee & Lal, Mumbai
- Bitmap: International Digital Photo Project, Loop, Incheon
- New Media Art from Pakistan, Artist Village, Kowloon, Hong Kong
- Metrospective: Visual Representations of Metro-sexuality, Kitab Mahal, Mumbai
- Parallel Realities: 3rd Fukuoka Triennale, Fukuoka Museum of Art, Fukuoka
- Subhodh Gupta, Rashid Rana & L.N. Tallur, Bose Pacia, New York
- Mirror Worlds: Contemporary Video from Asia, Australian Center for Photography, Sydney
- Beyond Borders: Art from Pakistan, National Gallery of Modern Art, Mumbai

=== 2004 ===
- Identical Views, V.M. Gallery, Karachi
- Identical Views, Nature Morte, New Delhi
- South Asian Masters: Old Masters and Young Voices, Alhamra Art Gallery, Lahore
- Art Summit IV, National Gallery of Art, Jakarta
- KOVIDEO: 1st Durban Video Festival, Kazna Gallery, Durban
- Playing with a Loaded Gun, Museum Fridericianum, Kassel
- Along the X Axis: Video Art from India and Pakistan, Apeejay Gallery, New Delhi10th Asian Art Biennale Bangladesh, Shilpakala Academy, Dhaka

=== 2003-4 ===
- 9th Cairo International Biennale, Cairo
- Global Priority (travelling exhibition), San Francisco Arts Commission gallery, San Francisco
- Playing with a Loaded Gun, Apexart, New York
- Miniatures Pakistanises, Maison d’Art Contemporarian Chaillioux, Paris

=== 2002 ===
- Around Miniature, Royaat Gallery, Lahore
- Around Miniature, Canvas Gallery, Karachi
- Painting over the Lines: Five Contemporary Artists from Pakistan, York Quay Gallery, Toronto
- Painting over the Lines: Five Contemporary Artists from Pakistan, Indo Center for Art and Culture, New York

=== 2001 ===
- Non-Sense, Rohtas Gallery, Islamabad
- Crossing the Line (site-specific project at Jackson Heights), Queens Museum of Art, New York

=== 2000 ===
- Non-Sense, Zahoor ul Akhlaq Gallery, NCA, Lahore
- Context, Barefoot Gallery, Colombo
- Another Vision: 50 Years of Pakistani Art (travelling exhibition), The Brunei Gallery, SOAS, London;
- Gallery Oldham; Haddonfield Art Gallery; Victoria Art Gallery, Bath

== Curatorial projects ==
- 2010 Resemble Reassemble: Contemporary Art from Pakistan, Devi Art Foundation, Gurgaon.
