= Wooloo (art collective) =

Danish art collective

Wooloo is a Danish artist collective founded by Sixten Kai Nielsen, Russell Ratshin, and Martin Rosengaard.

== History ==
The collective was founded in 2002. In 2006 Wooloo exhibited their interactive conceptual work "Asylum" at the WhiteBox Gallery in New York City wherein five international artists were detained while they competed to win the service of an immigration lawyer to help them obtain an O-1 United States visa. The same year, the group received the Franklin Furnace "Future of the Present" award. In 2007 Wooloo created and staged the work "Life Exchange" in the environs of a private New York City apartment. Wooloo participated in the 2010 addition of the roving contemporary art biennial Manifesta in Murcia, Spain with 'New Life Residency" where the art group invited five artists to live in the dark.

A project by Wooloo was included in the Maldives pavilion at the 2013 55th edition of the Venice Biennale.

In the summer of 2019, Wooloo exhibited an edition of their long running project "The Human Hotel" at the Garage Museum of Contemporary Art in Moscow, Russia, as part of the group exhibition "The Coming World: Ecology as the New Politics 2030-2100".
