= Manfredi Beninati =

Italian artist

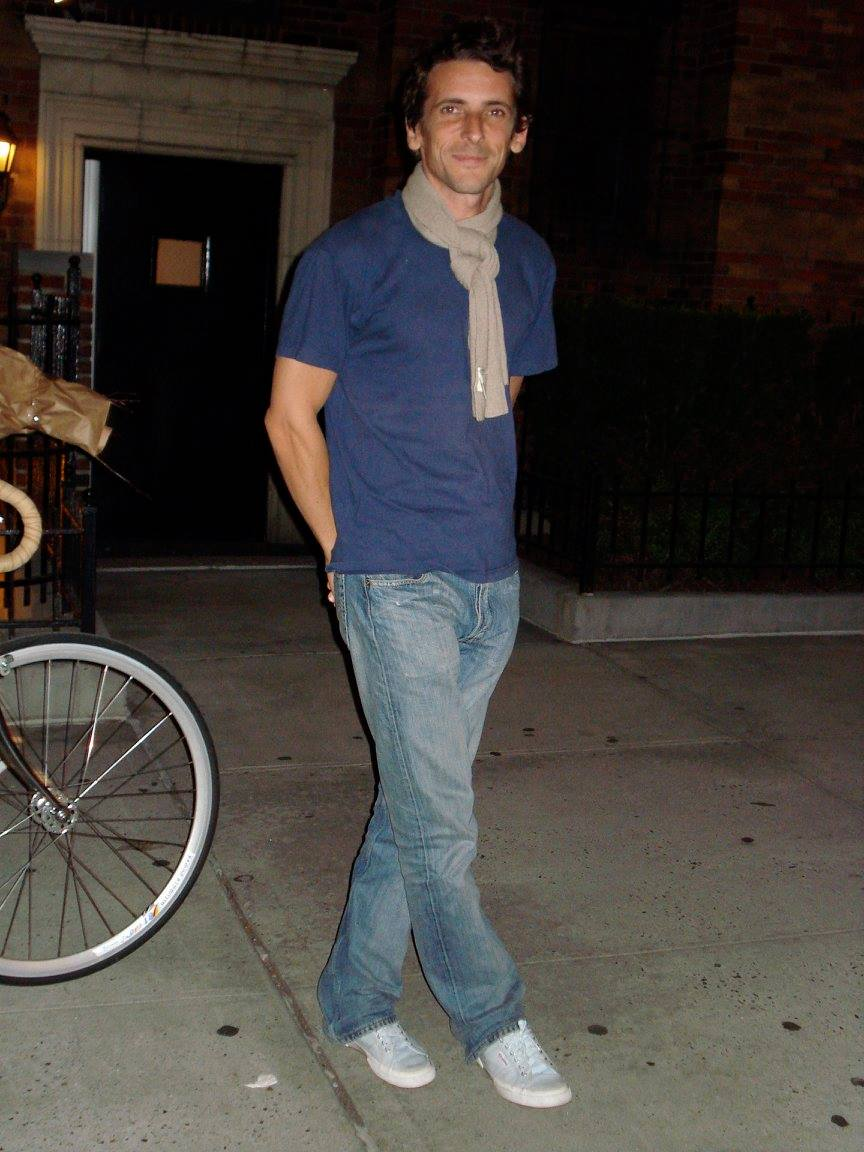
- Beninati in Chelsea, NYC in 2008
- Born: January 11, 1970 (age 56); Palermo, Italy
- Known for: Drawing, Painting, Installation, Sculpture, Film
- Movement: Installation art, post-modernism
- Website: www.manfredibeninati.net

Manfredi Beninati is an Italian artist born in Palermo (Sicily) in 1970. A contemporary figurative painter, his oeuvre also covers installations, drawings, sculpture, collage and film.

== Biography ==
After dropping out of both law and film school and collaborating with well-known Italian directors, Manfredi Beninati began working as an artist. He spent some time in Spain and England and, in 2002, when he came back to Italy, he began to make sculptures and figurative paintings that drew directly on real or imaginary childhood memories. Beninati first started studying law and then switched to film courses in the early 1990s while working as an assistant director in the Italian film industry.

In 1994 he moved to London where he started working as a visual artist. In 2005 he was selected as one of four artists to represent his country at the 51 Venice Biennale where he received the audience award for the Italian pavilion. In 2006 he was given a fellowship at the American Academy in Rome as part of the Rome Prize. He currently lives and works in Palermo, Rome and Los Angeles where, together with his wife Milena Muzquiz (of Los Super Elegantes) he has founded an experimental theatre group. He is represented by James Cohan Gallery in New York, Tomio Koyama in Tokyo and Galleria Lorcan O'Neill in Rome.

In 2014 Beninati had a solo show titled Nature is a Theatre at Inside-Out Art Museum in Beijing and in 2016 the Museo Civico in Castelbuono (Italy) has dedicated an anthological retrospective exhibition covering the first fifteen years of Beninati's work.

Beninati is also a patron of Italian cultural heritage, organizing exhibitions, workshops, seminars and producing publications on Italian talents, through a foundation he and his mother set up in the memory of his younger brother Flavio. Recent projects he has curated include a series of talks on Italian design and a workshop on architect Aldo Rossi held by American architect Thomas Tsang in Hong Kong and Palermo.

== Exhibitions ==
- 2016 "Dall'oggi al domani. 24 ore nell'arte contemporanea", MACRO, Rome, Italy
- 2012 "Double Take", 2nd Mardin Bienali, Mardin, Turkey
- 2009 "Heaven", 2nd Athens Biennale 2009, Athens, Greece
- 2008 "Made Up", Liverpool Biennial, Liverpool, U.K.

== Collections ==
- Zabludowicz Collection, Sarvisalo, London, New York
- Logan Collection, Denver
- Lodeveans Collection, London
- MAXXI - Museo nazionale delle arti del XXI secolo, Rome
- UBS Art Collection

== Awards and residencies ==
- IOAM - Inside-Out Art Museum, Beijing, 2013
- Civitella Ranieri Foundation Fellowship, 2010
- Rome Prize, American Academy in Rome, 2006
- Audience award – Italian pavilion, 51 Venice biennale, 2005
- Darc Prize for young Italian art, 2004

== Writings ==
- "Transhumanism according to Mr Campa", I quaderni di Eccegrammi, 2015
- Manfredi Beninati, "In an empty glass", Liverpool biennial catalog, 2008
- Manfredi Beninati, "Une image fixe vous tient en dehors d'elle-meme", Ligeia, 2006 (PDF in French)
