= Charles Avery (artist) =

Scottish artist

Charles Avery (born 1973) is a Scottish artist from Oban. He currently lives and works in London. Since 2004 he has devoted his practice to the perpetual description of an imaginary island. Through drawings, sculptures and texts. Avery describes the topology, cosmology and inhabitants of this fictional territory, from the market of the main town Onomatopoeia to the Eternal Forest where an unknown beast called the Noumenon is held to reside. The project can be read as a meditation on some of the central themes of philosophy of art-making, and on the colonization and ownership of the world of ideas.

== Exhibitions ==
The first most comprehensive presentation of The Islanders project, "The Islanders: An Introduction", was exhibited at Parasol Unit Foundation for Contemporary Art, London, in 2008 and toured to the Scottish National Gallery of Modern Art, Edinburgh, and Museum Boijmans Van Beuningen, Rotterdam, in 2009. Other solo presentations include the exhibition "Onomatopoeia, Part 1", which was exhibited at EX3- Centro per l’Arte Contemporanea, Florence in 2010 and toured to Kunstverein Hannover and Frac Ile-de-France/le Plateau, Paris in 2011.

Recent group exhibitions include: Life Forms, Bonniers Konsthall, Stockholm (2009); A Walk in Your Mind, Hayward Gallery, (2009); A Duck for Mr Darwin, Baltic Centre for Contemporary Art, (2009); and Altermodern: 4th Tate Triennial, London (2009). Avery represented Scotland at the 52nd Venice Biennale in 2007 and participated in the British Art Show 7 and Folkestone Triennial in 2011.

In 2014 Avery's work formed part of the "Generation" exhibition across Scotland, with his work displayed in the Edinburgh Gallery of Modern Art.

In 2015 Avery had a solo exhibition at GEM, the contemporary art museum in The Hague (Netherlands)
