= Helena Guàrdia =

Andorran artist (born 1966)

- Born: Helena Guàrdia Ribó; 19 December 1966 (age 59); Encamp, Andora
- Website: helenaguardia.com

Helena Guàrdia Ribó (born 19 December 1966) is an Andorran painter, photographer, installation artist, and video artist.

== Biography ==
Guàrdia was born Helena Guàrdia Ribó on 19 December 1966 in Encamp, Andora. She studied at the University of Barcelona, Escola de la Llotja, École des Beaux-Arts, and Bezalel Academy of Arts and Design.

She and Francisco Sánchez Sánchez were the artists selected to represent Andorra at the 54th Venice Biennale in 2011, the first time Andorra participated in the Biennale. Her contribution was Ciutat flotant ("floating city"), which curator Paolo De Grandis described as "photographs worked with techniques taken from the artisanal world." Guàrdia took photographs of scenes of Andorra reflected in a convex mirror, with an intent of showing Andorra "floating in the air" just as Venice seems to float on the water. The photographs were printed on a large scale and framed on various surfaces.

Guàrdia Ribó's artwork has appeared on postage stamps issued by the Andorran government: an image from her Venice Biennale contribution in 2011 and a stamp of the Coma Pedrosa in 2015.
