= Kunst- und Ausstellungshalle der Bundesrepublik Deutschland =

Museum in Bonn, Germany

Coordinates: 50°42′51″N 7°7′19.3″E

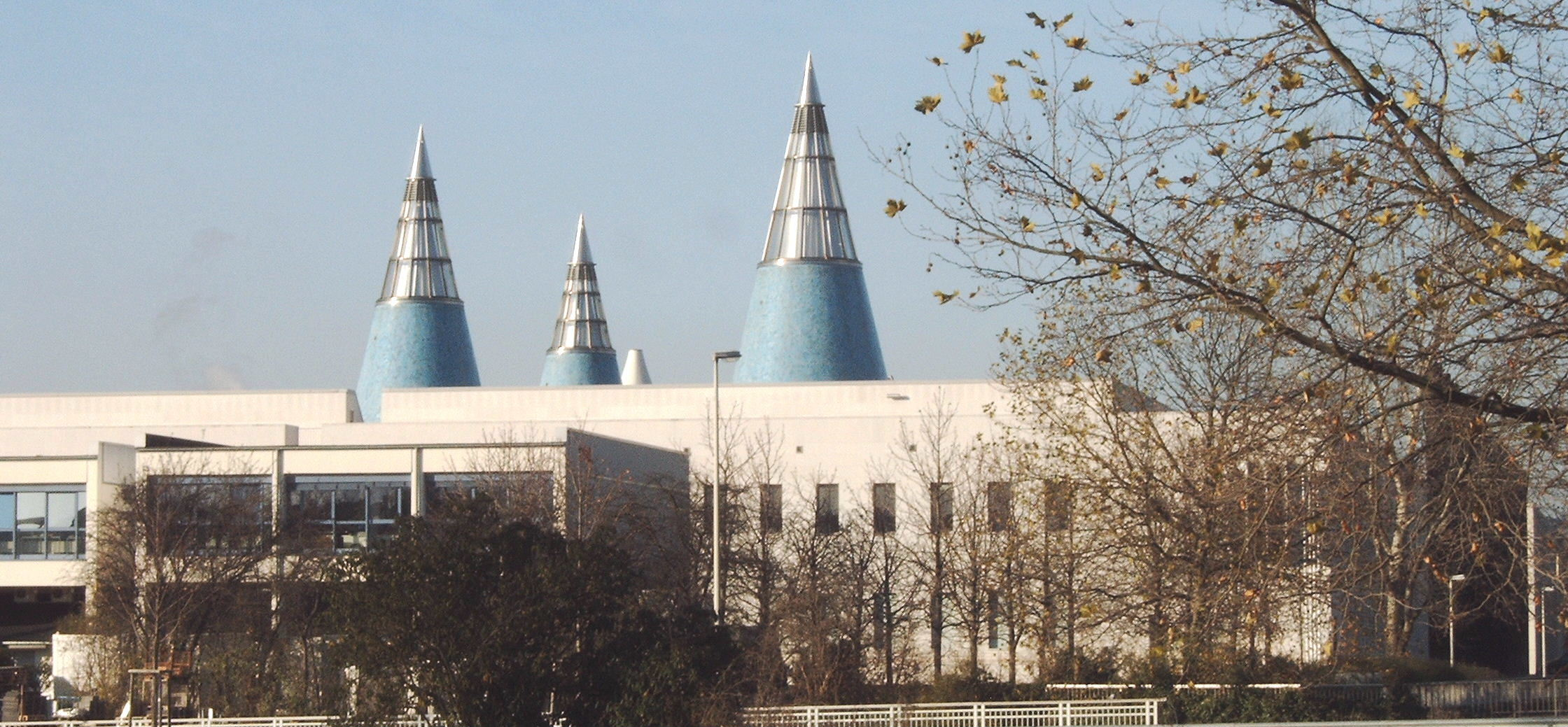
Art and exhibition hall of the Federal Republic of Germany

Kunst- und Ausstellungshalle der Bundesrepublik Deutschland, Bonn

Kunst- und Ausstellungshalle der Bundesrepublik Deutschland (Art and Exhibition Hall of the Federal Republic of Germany) is one of the most visited museums in Germany. Known as the Bundeskunsthalle for short, it is part of the so-called "Museum Mile" in Bonn. It holds exhibitions relating to art and cultural history from around the world. The museum is backed by the Federal Government and the States of Germany. The museum's director is Eva Kraus, a position she has held since 1 August 2020. Construction of the museum started in 1989 and was completed in 1992. The museum is located next to the Bonn Museum of Modern Art.

== Purpose ==
The 'Bundeskunsthalle' aims to exhibit the intellectual and cultural wealth of Germany, as well as create opportunities for cultural exchange with other countries. It also aims to be a forum for dialogue between culture and politics. From the start, the museum was conceived as a platform for temporary exhibitions and events of national and international importance and as a place which enriches German cultural life. The museum does not have its own collection.

The museum's main purpose is to hold exhibitions relating to art, culture, history, science, technology and the environment. Lectures and discussions are also held on the same topics. The architectural contest for the building included providing space for sculptures.

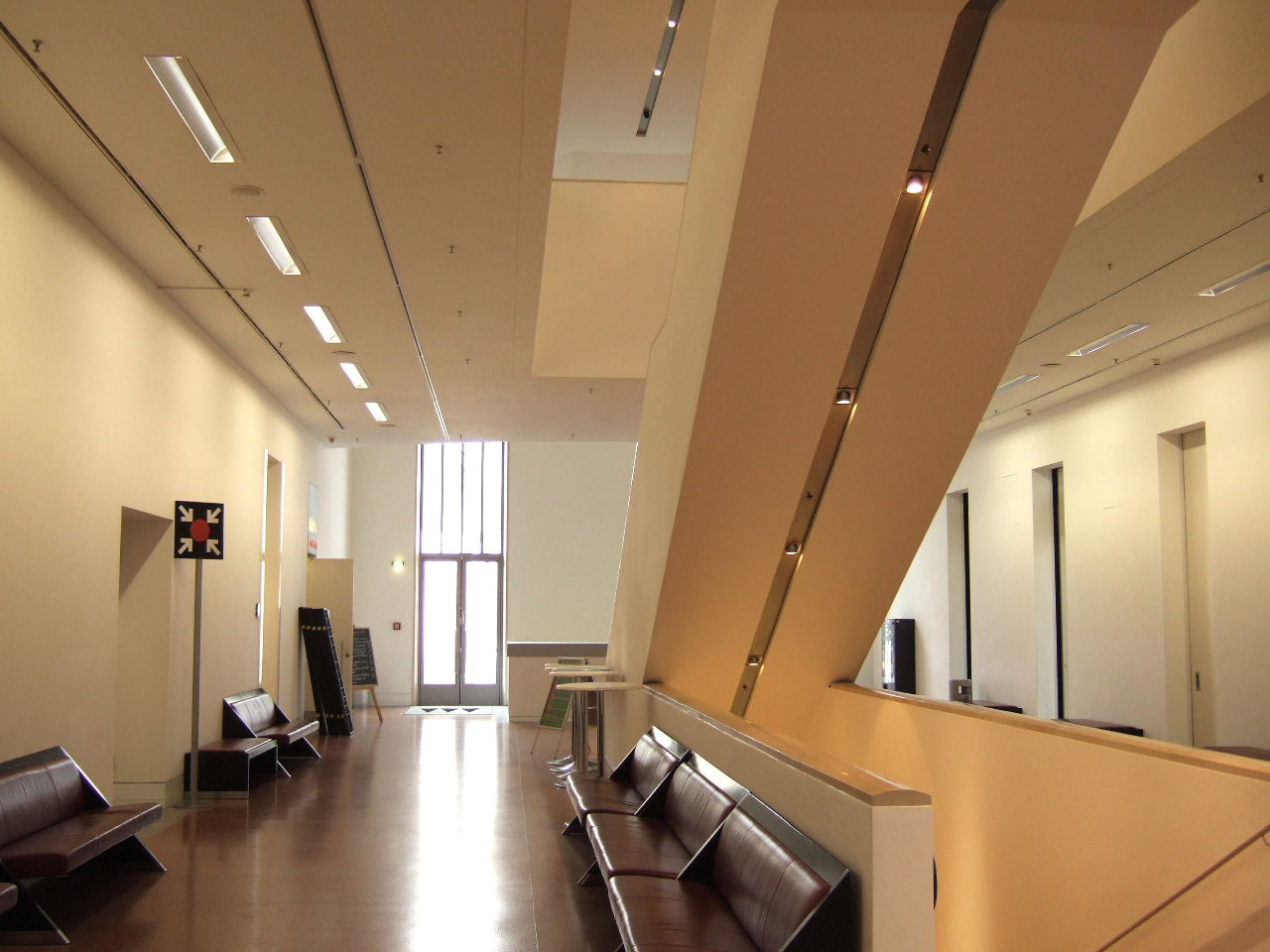
Interior view

== Special exhibitions ==
On its 5600 m^{2} exhibition area there are always two to four exhibitions on show. In the first ten years the Bundeskunsthalle presented more than 100 exhibitions from the fields of art and cultural history, science and technology. The exhibition with findings from the burial chamber of Tutankhamun from November 2004 to May 2005 attracted more than 850,000 visitors.
