= Tim Davies (pop art artist) =

British pop art artist

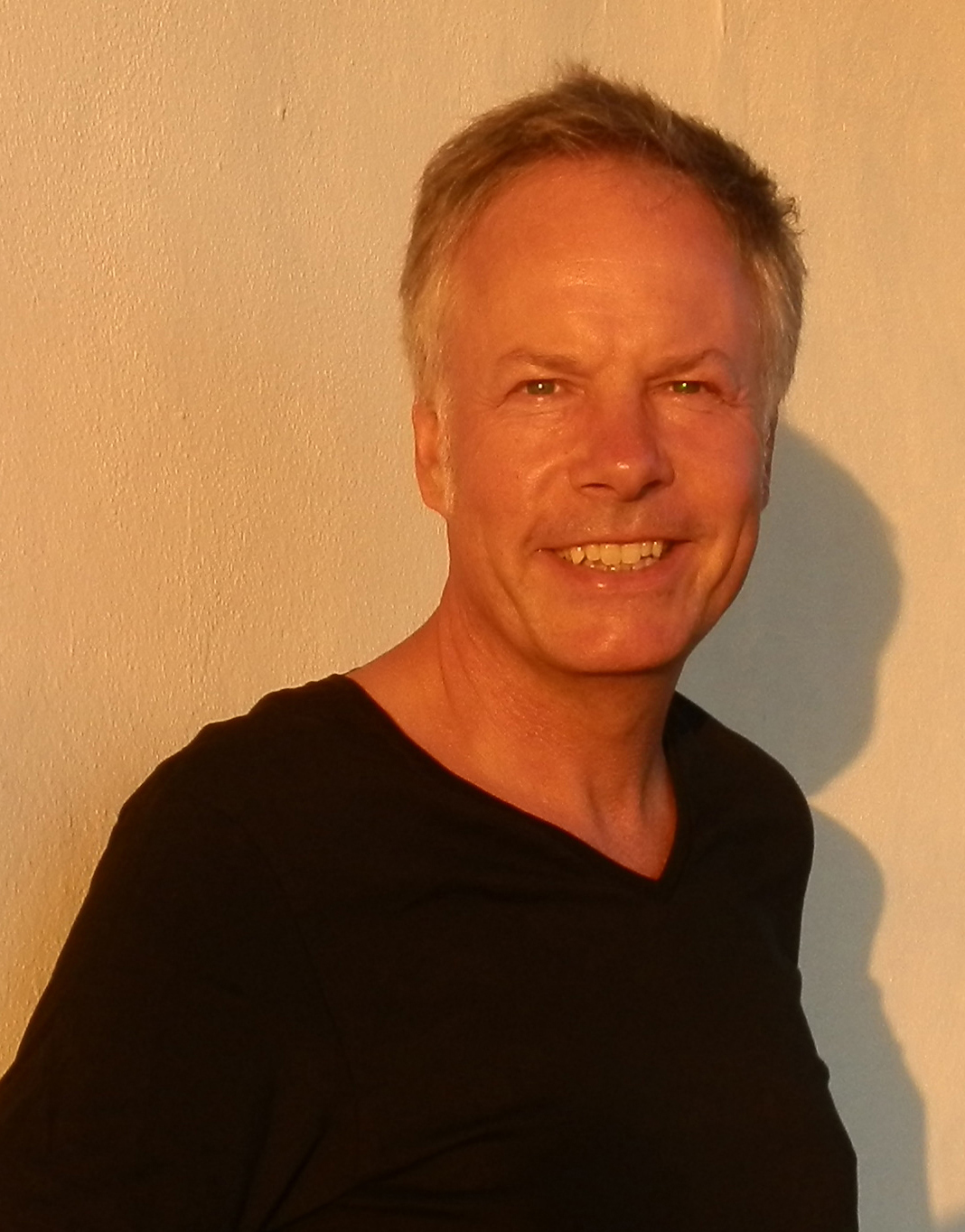
- Davies in 2013
- Born: 1959 (age 66–67)
- Education: Camberwell College of Arts; Saint Martin's School of Art
- Style: Pop art

Tim Davies (born 1959, Derbyshire, England) is a British pop art artist, currently living in Hanover, Germany. He is known for intensely colorful drawings nearly always depicting figures and often are related to music or dance. He designed CD covers for musicians like Al Di Meola, Robert Plant and Pink Floyd.

== Life ==
In 1983 Tim Davies finished art studies at the Camberwell School of Art, London (BA Hons degree in Graphic Arts, Master in Printmaking). At the Central St Martin's School of Art in London he studied from 1983 to 1985 under Norman Ackroyd.

In 1991 he had his first solo exhibition in London. He has created murals for restaurants, bars and clubs and also created designs for animation films. In 1995 he participated in the group exhibition England's Dreaming in Tokyo.

Other solo exhibitions took place 1997 in Zug, Zurich and St Moritz in Switzerland between 1998 and 2000. In 2001 and 2002 there were exhibitions in Hamburg, 2003 in Hanover (üstra Look Tim Davies). 2007 he created a mural for the London Transport Museum.

Since 2000, he has been creating glass and porcelain designs for the German Ritzenhoff company. For several musicians or music groups he designed CD covers.

In 2012 he created two robot figures on an original section of the Berlin Wall which was exhibited at Checkpoint Charlie.

Since he has been exhibiting and selling his artworks in the onboard galleries of the AIDA Cruises

== Gallery ==
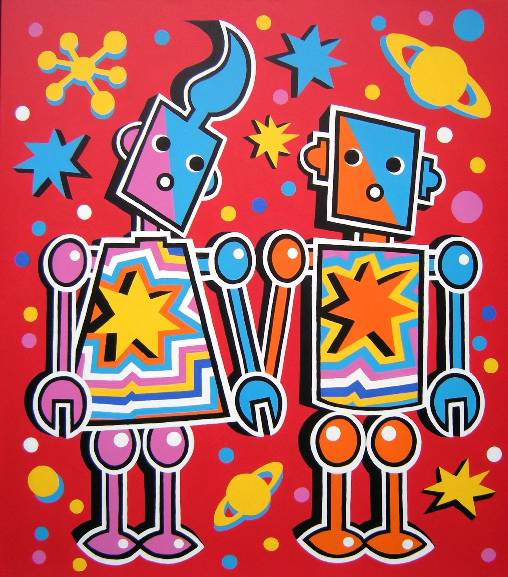
Space Robot Lovers (Scarlet version), 2012

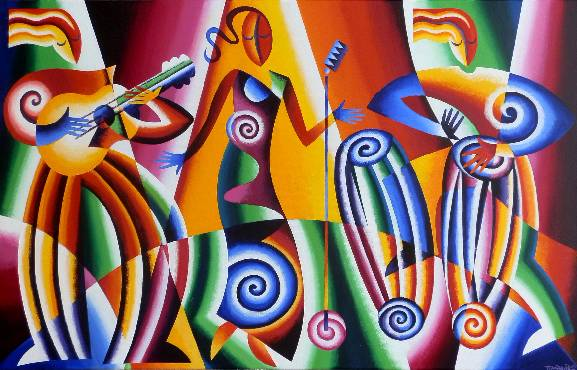
Summer Vibes, 2012

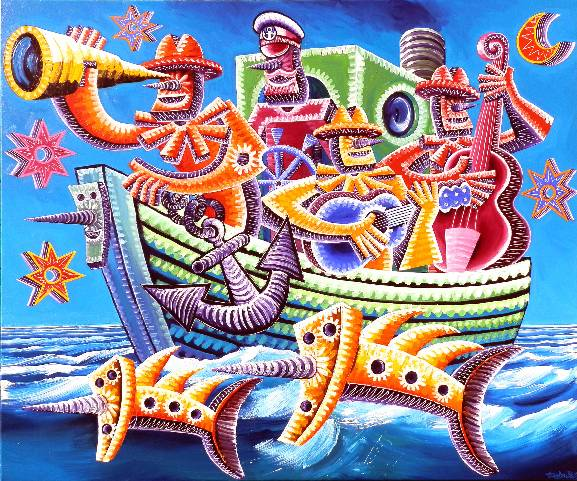
Trip To Formentera, 2013

== Literature ==
- Der Kunsthandel, Oktober 2013 (German)
- Tim Davies. In: ArtProfil - Magazin für Kunst, Heft 90, Dezember 2011 (German)
- Schweizer Illustrierte, Dezember 1997 und August 1998 (German)
