= Željko Kipke =

Croatian artist

Željko Kipke (born 3 March 1953) is a Croatian artist. His practice is based on painting and experimental film, but he is also a published art critic and theoretician. He was born in Čakovec, Croatia, but lives and works in Zagreb.

He was an associate in the Master Workshop of Ljubo Ivančić and Nikola Reiser (1976–1980). From 1982 he started orienting himself towards theory and began to publish essays and critiques about visual art and experimental film in newspapers and magazines. During the 1980s he began creating experimental film and to date has made a series of six films entitled Six Easy Pieces along with the video art works: Rhythm (1980) and Embedding into a Black Square (1984). He participated in Harald Szeemann’s exhibition Blood & Honey / Future’s in the Balkans in Klosterneuburg (Vienna) in 2003.

He has exhibited in a group show in the Artists’ Space in New York in 1989. His works are kept in many museum and gallery collections, including the Peter Stuyvesant Collection in Amsterdam, the FRAC Collection in Toulouse (Les Abattoirs), and MUMOK, (the Museum of Modern Art) in Vienna. He was the Croatian representative at the Venice Biennale in 1993 and at the Cairo Biennale two years later. He was the selector for the Croatian Pavilion at the 52nd Venice Biennale in 2007.

== Published works ==
- Illuminators of the New Cycle (1989)
- A Guide through Subterraneus (1992)
- Beware of Imitations (1993)
- From Plenty to the Moon (1998)
- Any Similarity to Real People or Events is Intentional (2004)
- From February to February (2005)
