= Başak Şenova =

Turkish art curator, writer, and designer

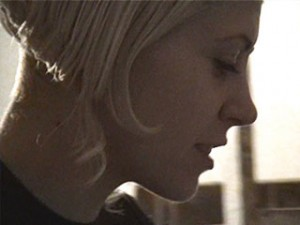
Basak Senova, 2007

Basak Senova is an art curator, writer and designer from Istanbul, Turkey. She has lived and worked in Vienna since 2017.

She holds an MFA in graphic design and a PhD in art, design and architecture from Bilkent University, and is active internationally with art and technology-related projects. She attended the Seventh Curatorial Training Programme of Stichting De Appel, Amsterdam in 2002. As an assistant professor, she lectured in various universities in Turkey, including Kadir Has University, Bilgi University, Koç University and Bilkent University. In 2017 she was the resident fellow at the University of the Arts, Helsinki in co-operation with HIAP. In 2017, she received associate professorship from the Higher Education Council of Turkey. From 2020 to 2022, she was a visiting professor at the University of Applied Arts Vienna, running a research-based educational platform, the Octopus Programme. She is now a senior postdoctoral researcher at the University of Applied Arts Vienna.

She has been writing on art art, technology and media, initiating and developing projects and curating exhibitions since 1995.

== Curatorial ==
Senova was the curator of the Pavilion of Turkey at the 53rd Venice Biennale. She co-curated the UNCOVERED (Cyprus) and the 2nd and 5th Biennial of Contemporary Art, D-0 ARK Underground (Bosnia and Herzegovina). In 2014, she acted as the Art Gallery Chair of (ACM) SIGGRAPH 2014 (Vancouver) the curator of the Helsinki Photography Biennial 2014 and the Jerusalem Show VII: Fractures. In 2015, she curated the Pavilion of Republic of Macedonia at the 56th Venice Biennale and in 2016, Lines of Passage (in medias res) Exhibition in Lesvos and in 2019 the inaugural exhibition of B7L9, Climbing through the Tide in Tunis. In 2019, she also completed a long-term research-based art project CrossSections in Vienna, Helsinki, and Stockholm. Between 2017-2019, she worked on CrossSections, a research/process-based art project, and curated five groups and three solo exhibitions in the context of the project in Vienna, Helsinki, Stockholm, and Rome in 2018 and 2019. In 2022, she concluded the Octopus Programme with two exhibitions that took place in Tunis and Vienna.

Şenova has initiated projects and curated exhibitions in Turkey and abroad since 1996. Her curatorial projects include ctrl-alt-del sound art project series (since 2003), "NOMAD-TV.network 01", "loosing.ctrl", "Serial Cases", "under.ctrl", "s-network", "Rejection Episodes", "Conscious in Coma", "Unrecorded", "Aftermath", "Soft Borders" and "The Translation". She curated Zorlu Center Collection for two years (2011-2012) and during that time she was the editor of its publications. She acted as an advisory board member of the Turkish Pavilion in the Venice Biennale and Istanbul Biennial.

== Editorial ==
Senova is the editor of art-ist 6, Kontrol Online Magazine, Lapses book series, UNCOVERED, Aftermath, Obje'ct, The Move, The Translation, Scientific Inquiries, Cultural Massacre, Ahmet Elhan-Ground Glass and Lines of Passage (in medias res) among other publications. She is one of the editorial correspondents of ibraaz.org and the Turkish correspondent of Flash Art International. She is a member of the International Biennial Association's (IBA) editorial board.
