= Collezione Farnesina Experimenta =

- Author: Maurizio Calvesi, Lorenzo Canova, Marco Meneguzzo, Marisa Vescovo.
- Language: English, Italian
- Subject: Farnesina Experimenta Art Collection, Italian Contemporary art
- Genre: Catalogue, Essay
- Publisher: Gangemi Editore
- Publication date: 2008
- Publication place: Italy
- Media type: Print (Paperback)
- Pages: 232
- ISBN: 978-88-492-1486-4
- OCLC: 268784254
- LC Class: N6918.6 .E97 2008

Collezione Farnesina Experimenta is a bilingual book (Italian and English) that assembles and catalogues the eighty works (reproduced in colour) of the Farnesina Experimenta Art Collection, housed in Palazzo della Farnesina.

Along with exhibitions of the collection that are promoted by the Italian Ministry of Foreign Affairs, the aim of the volume is to valorize and make known contemporary Italian art, by supporting those generations of artists who made names for themselves from the nineties to the year 2000.

== The volume ==
In addition to being a catalogue of the works, the volume contains biographical entries of the artists and four critical essays:

- What is its Function? by Maurizio Calvesi,
- Experiments For The Future by Lorenzo Canova,
- The Perception Of Young Italian Art by Marco Meneguzzo,
- Contemporary Paradigms by Marisa Vescovo,

which reveal how Italian contemporary art still shows a capacity to be reborn, to find a new meaning and new energies for facing the complexity of its own historical moment, by combining elements of the country’s prolific artistic history with the most evolved inclinations of contemporaneity.

== Catalogue of the collection ==
The Farnesina Experimenta Art Collection amplifies the Italian collection of art of Palazzo della Farnesina and represents the current state of art in Italy. The collection includes works that have been created using the different forms of expression that distinguish contemporary art: from video art to painting, from photography to digital art, from sculpture to drawing to installation. The eighty works in the collection are by artists from all over Italy.

=== Artists ===
- Andrea Aquilanti
- Stefano Arienti
- Stefania Aragona
- Matteo Basilè
- Alessandro Bazan
- Angelo Bellobono
- Carlo Benvenuto
- Fausto Bertasa
- Bianco-Valente
- Paola Binante
- Nicola Bolla
- Marco Bolognesi
- Enrica Borghi
- Domenico Borrelli
- Botto & Bruno
- Letizia Cariello
- Francesco Carone
- Gea Casolaro
- Loris Cecchini
- Filippo Centenari
- Francesco Cervelli
- Marco Cingolani
- Marco Colazzo
- Davide Coltro
- Paolo Consorti
- Vittorio Corsini
- Francesco De Grandi
- Fabrice de Nola
- Alberto Di Fabio
- Andrea Di Marco
- Fulvio Di Piazza
- Mauro Di Silvestre
- Stefania Fabrizi
- David Fagioli
- Roberto Falconieri
- Lara Favaretto
- Flavio Favelli
- Emanuela Fiorelli
- Licia Galizia
- Daniele Galliano
- Piero Golia
- Paolo Grassino
- Jonathan Guaitamacchi
- Francesco Impellizzeri
- Laboratorio Saccardi
- Massimo Livadiotti
- Federico Lombardo
- Raffaele Luongo
- Marcello Maloberti
- Andrea Martinelli
- Simone Martinetto
- Andrea Mastrovito
- Luca Matti
- Sabrina Mezzaqui
- Liliana Moro
- Luigi Mulas Debois
- Adriano Nardi
- Andrea Nicodemo
- Davide Nido
- Giorgio Ortona
- Luca Pancrazzi
- Perino & Vele
- Luca Pignatelli
- Paolo Piscitelli
- Laura Pugno
- Pierluigi Pusole
- Paolo Radi
- Mauro Reggio
- Antonio Riello
- Alessandro Scartabello
- Francesco Sena
- Federico Solmi
- Giuseppe Stampone
- Silvano Tessarollo
- Saverio Todaro
- Sabrina Torelli
- Luisa Valentini
- Nicola Verlato
- Marco Verrelli
- Fabio Viale
- Cesare Viel
- Antonello Viola
- Luca Vitone

== See also ==
- Farnesina Experimenta Art Collection

== Editions ==
- Maurizio Calvesi, Lorenzo Canova, Marco Meneguzzo, Marisa Vescovo, Collezione Farnesina Experimenta, Gangemi Editore, 2008. pp. 232, ISBN 978-88-492-1486-4.
