= Farnesina Experimenta Art Collection =

Art collection in Rome, Italy

Coordinates: 41°56′12.5″N 12°27′26.5″E

The Farnesina Art Collection (Italian: Collezione Farnesina) is a contemporary Italian art collection exhibited at the Palazzo della Farnesina, the seat of the Italian Ministry of Foreign Affairs in Rome, Italy.

== The collection ==
The collection was first created to document in an anthological manner the production of the recent generations of artists and the tendencies of contemporary Italian art, in order to support and promote the artistic culture of Italy in the world.

The Farnesina Experimenta augments the collection of contemporary works of art of the Italian Ministry of Foreign Affairs, amplifying the historical Farnesina Collection of Italian art of the 20th century.

The works have been chosen by a scientific committee directed by Maurizio Calvesi and composed of Lorenzo Canova, Marco Meneguzzo and Marisa Vescovo. The works are chosen with the purpose of documenting the different artistic currents present in Italy from the 1990s to 2000.

== The works and the artists ==
The collection, documented by a bilingual catalogue (Italian and English), consists of eighty works by an equal number of artists, according to a principal of anthological representation of the varied and multiform panorama of contemporary Italian art.

The 80 artists of the Farnesina Experimenta, who come from all over Italy, are:

- Andrea Aquilanti
- Stefano Arienti
- Stefania Aragona
- Matteo Basilè
- Alessandro Bazan
- Angelo Bellobono
- Carlo Benvenuto
- Fausto Bertasa
- Bianco-Valente
- Paola Binante
- Nicola Bolla
- Marco Bolognesi
- Enrica Borghi
- Domenico Borrelli
- Botto & Bruno
- Letizia Cariello
- Francesco Carone
- Gea Casolaro
- Loris Cecchini
- Filippo Centenari
- Francesco Cervelli
- Marco Cingolani
- Marco Colazzo
- Davide Coltro
- Paolo Consorti
- Vittorio Corsini
- Francesco De Grandi
- Fabrice de Nola
- Alberto Di Fabio
- Andrea Di Marco
- Fulvio Di Piazza
- Mauro Di Silvestre
- Stefania Fabrizi
- David Fagioli
- Roberto Falconieri
- Lara Favaretto
- Flavio Favelli
- Emanuela Fiorelli
- Licia Galizia
- Daniele Galliano
- Piero Golia
- Paolo Grassino
- Jonathan Guaitamacchi
- Francesco Impellizzeri
- Laboratorio Saccardi
- Massimo Livadiotti
- Federico Lombardo
- Raffaele Luongo
- Marcello Maloberti
- Andrea Martinelli
- Simone Martinetto
- Andrea Mastrovito
- Luca Matti
- Sabrina Mezzaqui
- Liliana Moro
- Luigi Mulas Debois
- Adriano Nardi
- Andrea Nicodemo
- Davide Nido
- Giorgio Ortona
- Luca Pancrazzi
- Perino & Vele
- Luca Pignatelli
- Paolo Piscitelli
- Laura Pugno
- Pierluigi Pusole
- Paolo Radi
- Mauro Reggio
- Antonio Riello
- Alessandro Scartabello
- Francesco Sena
- Federico Solmi
- Giuseppe Stampone
- Silvano Tessarollo
- Saverio Todaro
- Sabrina Torelli
- Luisa Valentini
- Nicola Verlato
- Marco Verrelli
- Fabio Viale
- Cesare Viel
- Antonello Viola
- Luca Vitone

== The exhibitions ==
With the aim of promoting and supporting the most promising emerging artistic talents, the Farnesina Experimenta Art Collection was presented to the public on 5 July 2008 at an extraordinary opening of the Ministry of Foreign Affairs, in accordance with the formula Open Doors at the Farnesina.

In order to valorize Italian creativity and make it known internationally, Experimenta will be exhibited in Athens, Istanbul and Moscow during the year 2009, and in Berlin, Beijing, Shanghai, Sydney and São Paulo in 2010.

== Bibliography ==
Maurizio Calvesi, Lorenzo Canova, Marisa Vescovo, Marco Meneguzzo. Collezione Farnesina Experimenta. Rome, Gangemi Editori, 2008. ISBN 88-492-1486-3.

== See also ==
- Palazzo della Farnesina
- Art of Italy
- Culture of Italy
- Italian Ministry of Foreign Affairs
- 15th Rome Quadriennale
