= Bruno Ceccobelli =

Italian painter and sculptor

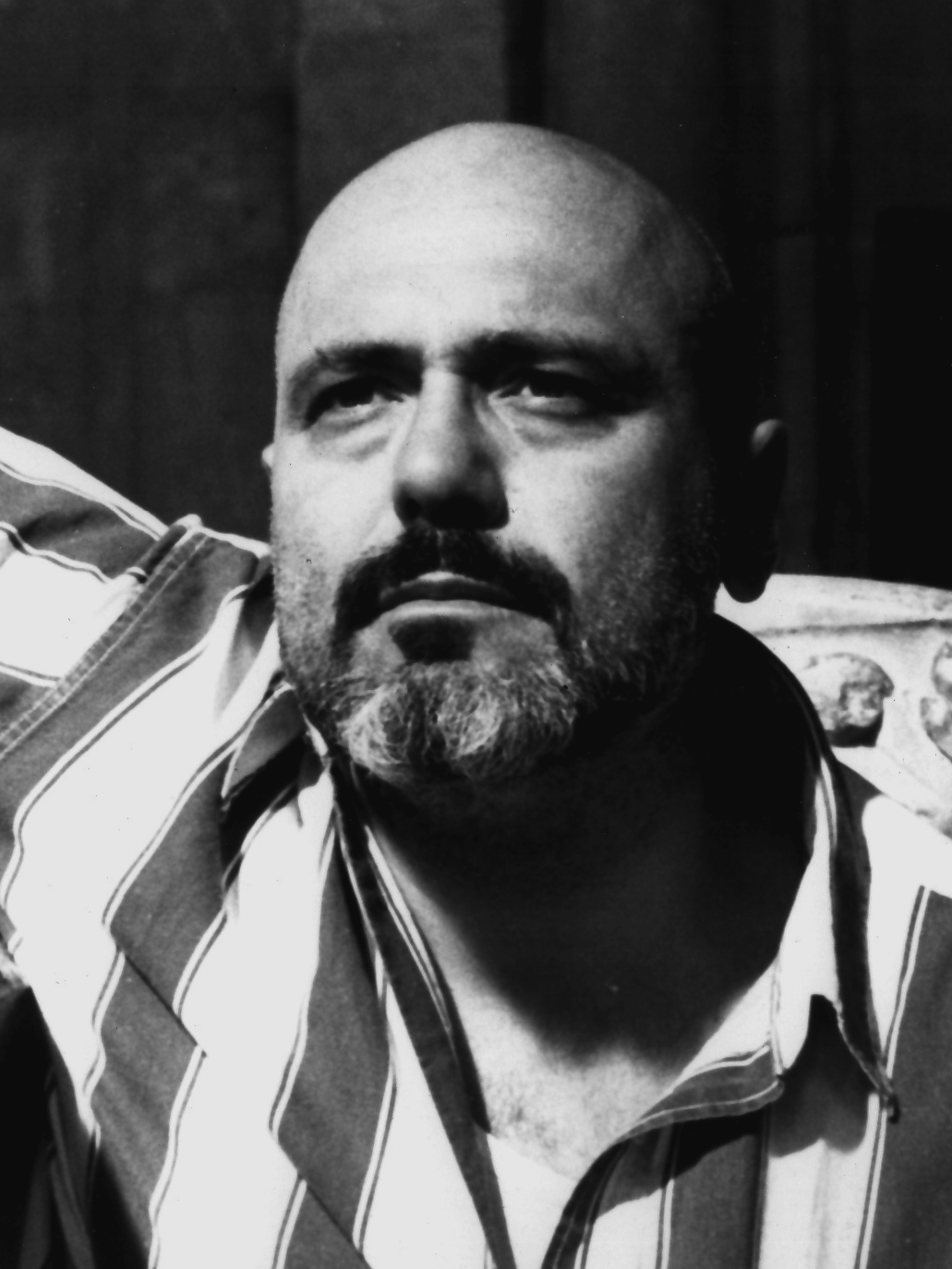
- Ceccobelli in 1998
- Born: 2 September 1952 (age 73); Monte Castello di Vibio, Italy
- Known for: Painting, sculpture
- Movement: Scuola di San Lorenzo or Nuova Scuola Romana

Bruno Ceccobelli (born 2 September 1952) is an Italian painter and sculptor. He currently resides and works in Todi, Italy. Ceccobelli was one of the six artists of the Nuova Scuola Romana or Scuola di San Lorenzo, an artistic movement that grew out of the Arte Povera and Transavanguardia movements of the latter twentieth century.

== Life ==
He wrote: "I do not want to be a market-fan artist, but to belong to all times, and this is why I believe in a foreseeing art, not just historical or literary or sociological or stylistic. I believe in a symbolic art, capable to offer a message and to pacify the world". In 1971, he first took part in a group exhibition in the Town Hall of Albach, Austria, and, six years later, he had his first solo exhibition at the Alternative Space Gallery in Rome, where he exhibited works of conceptual art. He also participated in two group exhibitions at La Stanza, an independent space self-managed by young artists.

In the early 1980s, Ceccobelli and other artists settled in the former Pastificio Cerere, a large abandoned industrial space located in the San Lorenzo quarter in Rome. The group, known as the New Roman School or San Lorenzo Workshop, included Piero Pizzi Cannella, Marco Tirelli, Giuseppe Gallo, Gianni Dessì, Nunzio Di Stefano and Domenico Bianchi. The Italian art critic Achille Bonito Oliva wrote that these artists were "all bearers of individual poetics and all streams towards a common aesthetic mentality and a moral vision of art".

In the following years, he had a number of international exhibitions: in 1979, at the Festival of Italian Culture in Belgrade and, subsequently, group exhibitions in France, Germany, and Croatia. At Yvon Lambert in Paris he exhibited Morpheus.

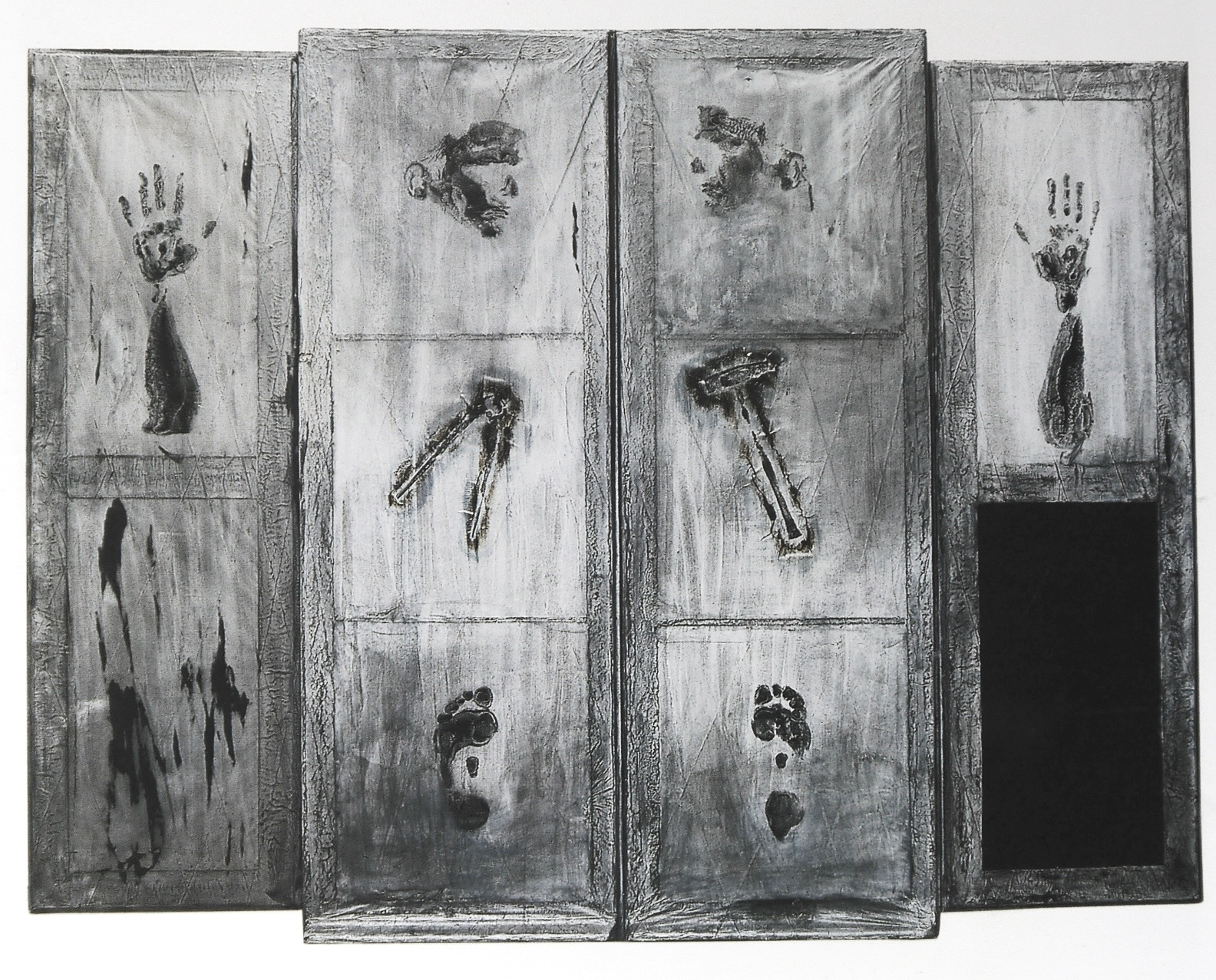
Artista Re (1987), paper on wood, graphite and wax, 160 x 205 cm

The 1990s started with exhibitions in Germany, Austria, Canada and Italy. In 1994, he was invited to give a training course at the École Nationale des Beaux-Artes in Senegal, an experience that would leave a deep influence on his life.

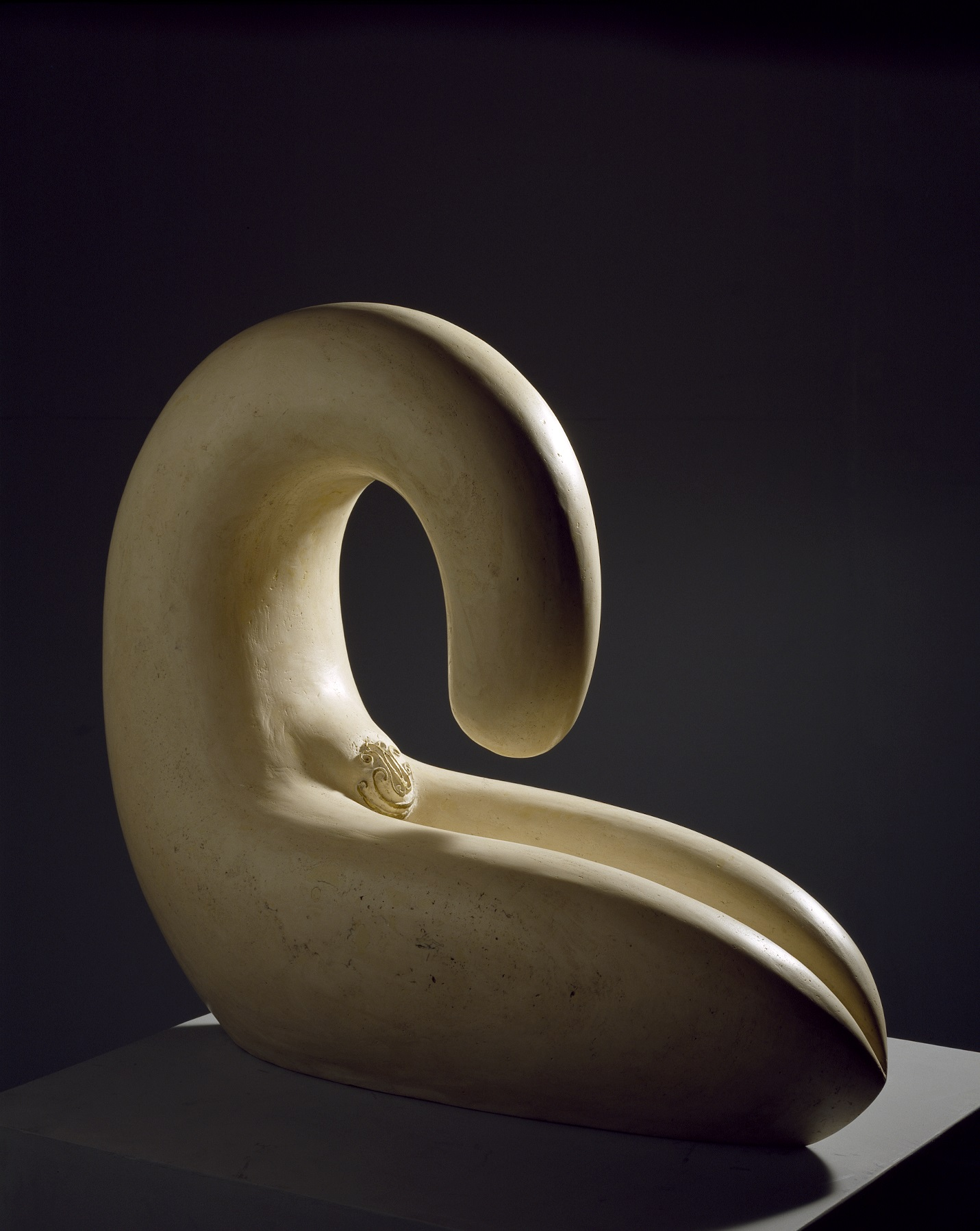
Leda (2000), travertine

In 1999, Arturo Schwarz was the curator of Ceccobelli's exhibition "Trascorsi d’Asfalto" at the Guastalla Centro Arte Gallery (Livorno), and in the same year, he exhibited in Bilbao (Luis Borgus).

During the Jubilee Year (2000), he was entrusted with the realisation of the huge portals in iron corten and bronze for the Cathedral of Terni, in Italy.

In 2002, Ceccobelli celebrated at the B.M.B. Gallery his twenty years of exhibitions in Dutch Galleries.

The next year, he published the book Color Bellezza, a collection of his essays expressing his longing for a forthcoming aesthetic society. Also, in 2005, he held his important solo-exhibition "Classico Eclettico" at the Archaeological Museum of Villa Adriana in Tivoli (Roma).

In 2004, Ceccobelli realised the mosaic "Eternity is the true healer" in Gibellina (Sicily) and the following year the Guastalla Gallery in Livorno presented the anthological exhibition "Big Works 1989-2005". In the same year, he wrote the book Tempo senza tempo della pittura, which is a collection of comparisons about yesterday's and today's artists, an opportunity to theorise his aesthetic arguments.

In 2005, he was appointed as Director of the Academy of Fine Arts "Pietro Vannucci" of Perugia, Italy.

In 2006, Ceccobelli presented a series of marble sculptures in Verona and in Pietrasanta at the gallery Spirale Arte, and participated in the important group exhibition "San Lorenzo" at Villa Medici (Roma).

Among the most recent exhibitions to be noted are "Longa Marcia post-temporale" (Volume! Roma 2007), "Invasi" (Fondazione Pastificio Cerere, Roma), "Attici unici" (Attico of Fabio Sargentini, Roma 2009), and the impressive "Natalis in Urbe" (Basilica di Santa Maria Sopra Minerva, Roma 2009).

Also in 2009, the Museum of Contemporary Art (MaRT) of Rovereto presented the first retrospective exhibition dedicated to the Officina San Lorenzo, which traced the history of that group. The exhibition catalogue, was published by Silvana Editorale and edited by Daniela Lancioni.

In 2010, he took part in the group exhibition at the Limen 895 Gallery "San Lorenzo, la soglia del’arte", curated by Achille Bonito Oliva (Roma) and is in the 16th Biennale of contemporary sacred art organised by the Italian Foundation Staurós (Isola del Gran Sasso). Also to be remembered is the exhibition "In carta sogni. Works on Paper 1980-2010", organised by R. Rodriguez, at the Museum of Abruzzo People (Pescara 2010), which, for the first time ever, shows Ceccobelli's main graphic works. In the same year, the Anfiteatro Arte Gallery (Padova) organises the retrospective "Early Works", which gives a survey of the extraordinary period between 1982 and 1992. In 2010, Ceccobelli published his third book, Gratiaplena. Economia della grazia, which contains his spiritual legacy in the form of a collection of inspired writings on aesthetics and society.

In 2011, Ceccobeli's exhibitions included "Schöne Träume"" in Rovereto, which explored dream imagery through pillow-case impressions, "Grandi opere... Grandi" at the Fondazione Marconi in Milan, and the Lazio regional pavilion at the Venice Biennale, curated by Vittorio Sgarbi as director of Italy's national pavilion that year.

In 2012, Ceccobelli presented his solo exhibition "Eroi d’Eros" (Catania), which collects 101 erotic drawings, then at the Museum of Modern Art in Buenos Aires, Argentina (2013). Among the group exhibitions, we point out the show held at the Galerie Placido (Paris), in which he is presented together with his friends Dessì, Nunzio, Gallo, Pizzi and Cannella. In Padova, October 2012, he set up "Con passi Dorati" (at the oratorio di San Rocco), a site-specific show supported by the Padova Council hall.

In 2013, an important solo-exhibition is "209-Icona from NYC", in Novara in the gallery Nunzio Sorrenti, with small works from the '80s. "Gli anni '70 a Roma", organised by Daniela Lancioni and presented at the Palazzo delle Esposizioni di Roma, is the group exhibition that closed the year 2013.

In 2014, the solo exhibitions were: "Summa Felix" in Cosenza at the Vertigo Arte Cultural Association, full of his pictorial well known symbols; furthermore "Terra Cotta" at the municipal space La Rinascente in Padova, with an anthology on the twenty-years production of his ceramics, and with the participation of his sons Auro and Celso; and "Port'Ostensorio" at the Susanna Orlando gallery in Pietrasanta with some consecrated host-shaped paintings blessed by art. In December 2014, a collective "Fuoco nero" - Materia e struttura attorno e dopo Burri, organised by A. C. Quintavalle, was presented at the Scuderie in Pilotta, Parma.

In 2015, the solo exhibition "Capovolgere" – l’ABC Ceccobelli", an exhibition at the Pastificio Cerere Foundation in Rome, was divided into two parts: "Pupille" with works on mirrored bitumen; "Ritratti di bandiera", a six-handed work with his sons Auro and Celso.

Still in 2015, a collective exhibition in Sant'Etien was organised by the VOLUME! Foundation, at the Museum of Modern Art: "Arte Contemporanea". In 2016, the exhibition "Icons", curated by Cicno G. G. Edizioni, was a solo exhibition at the Academy of Saint Petersburg in Russia, with works dedicated to the Byzantine classical tradition; and always in 2016 in Ravenna, at the National Museum and at the Basilica of Sant'Apollinare in Classe: "Ceccobelli and the icons of the Classense Collection".

"Con sorti Belli" is another personal exhibition, presented in Rome at the Augusto Consorti Gallery.

In 2017, the exhibitions are: "Autoritratti da dentro" – La ceramica prende forma, in lustre ceramics curated by Marco Tonelli, at the Palazzo Podestarile in Montelupo Fiorentino; and the exhibition "Undisclosed stories", curated by Davide Sarchioni and Maria Concetta Monaci, in Capalbio, at the Palazzo Collacchioni.

In 2018, he took part in the collective "Challenging Beauty - Insights in Italian Contemporary Art", curated by Lorand Hegyi, in the Parkview Museum in Singapore; "Painting after post-modernism" curated by Barbara Rose, in the Royal Palace of Caserta; "La Scuola di San Lorenzo. Una Factory romana", at the Museo Carisj, in Jesi; and "Al passo con la Costituzione", at the Central State Archive, in Rome; while among the personal exhibitions we enumerate the site-specific installation "T'odi" curated by D. Lancioni, at the "Sala delle Pietre" in Todi and at the same time "Primo segno – Recente sogno", at the Bibo's Place Gallery, in Todi.

In 2019, his works were shown at the following group exhibitions: "Collezione Farnesina", India Art Fair, Nuova Delhi, then traveling: Calcutta e Mumbai; "Unforgettable Umbria" Baldeschi Palace, curated by the Cassa di Risparmio Foundation in Perugia; "25 libri 25 artisti", Williamson Gallery, Los Angeles (USA) curated by P. Varroni; and the solo exhibitions: "Doppia Luce", at the Galleria E3 Arte Contemporanea in Brescia and "MORMORIIMARMOREI", at the Museo Collicola, in conjunction with the 62° Spoleto Festival curated by M. Tonelli.

== Publications ==
Ceccobelli's writings have been collected into four books:

- L'arte del possibile reale, ed. by L. Marucci, Stamperia dell'Arancio, Grottammare-Ascoli Piceno 1994;
- Color Bellezza, ed. by N. Micieli, Il Grandevetro-Jaca Book, Pisa 2002;
- Tempo senza tempo della pittura, De Luca Editori d'Arte, Roma 2005;
- Gratiaplena. Economia della grazia, ed. by M. Bastianelli, Effe Fabrizio Fabbri Editore, Perugia 2008, 2011.

== Museums and private collections ==
- The Museum of Modern Art (MOMA) – New York
- Museum Moderner Kunst Stiftung Ludwig (mumok) – Vienna
- Museo d'Arte Contemporanea di Roma (MACRO) – Roma
- Museum of Fine Arts, Boston – Boston
- Groninger Museum – Groningen
- Palazzo della Farnesina – Collezione Farnesina Experimenta – Rome
- Museo di Portofino – Portofino
- Museo dello Splendore
- Collezione Maramotti – Reggio Emilia
- Fabbrica Borroni
- Merano Arte im Haus der Sparkasse
- Collezione Banca Intesa San Paolo
- Collezione Unicredit Group
- Maon – Museo dell'Arte dell'Otto e del Novecento
- Banca di Credito Cooperativo di Calcio e Covo
- La Serpara, Civitella d’Agliano, Italy
- Maon – Museo dell'Arte dell'Otto e del Novecento http://www.maon.it
- Banca di Credito Cooperativo di Calcio e Covo https://web.archive.org/web/20141129083249/http://www.bcccalciocovo.it/template/default.asp?i_menuID=19792
- Cassino Museo Arte Contemporane http://www.camusac.com/dettcollezioni-Ceccobelli_Bruno/3_191/ita/
- Fondazione de Fornaris http://www.fondazionedefornaris.org/artworks/category/ceccobelli-bruno.html
