= Enrico Del Debbio =

Italian architect and university professor

- Born: 26 May 1891; Carrara, Kingdom of Italy
- Died: 12 July 1973 (aged 82); Rome, Italy
- Occupations: Architect, professor

Enrico Del Debbio (26 May 1891 – 12 July 1973) was an Italian architect and university professor.

== Life and career ==
Born at Carrara, he studied in the Fine Art Academy there specializing in architecture. He moved to Rome in 1914 where he won several architectural awards. He also began to teach in the Scuola Superiore di Architettura. In the 1920s, he held several positions in public institutions, such as the organization of the Quadriennale Romana. In 1931, he became artistical-technical consultant in the Palazzo delle Esposizioni for an exhibition celebrating the Decennal of the Fascist Revolution; he was also director of the technical office of the Balilla House (the fascist youth organization).

In 1923, he designed the FIAT palace in Via Calabria in Rome. In 1927, he was commissioned the new Foro Mussolini, a sport complex now known as Foro Italico (finished in 1960), including the Stadio dei Marmi (1928) and the Palazzo della Farnesina, the current seat of the Italian Ministry of Foreign Affairs. He also designed the Stadio del Nuoto ("Swimming Stadium", 1956).

He died in Rome in 1973.

Del Debbio became unfashionable during the 1970s, seen as "reactionary" because of his associations with fascism. However, in 2007, a retrospective exhibition took place at the Galleria Nazionale d'Arte Moderna in Rome, displaying his skills at combining classic and modern, detailing and geometry, materials and colours.
