= 15th Rome Quadriennale =

Italian art exhibition

The 15th Rome Quadriennale or XV Rome Quadriennale (Italian pronunciation: Quindicesima Quadriennale di Roma) is an Italian art exhibition (the 15th edition of the Rome Quadrennial) held between 19 June and 14 September 2008 at its historical site, the Palazzo delle Esposizioni of Rome, Italy.

The exhibition has no thematic restrictions and originates with the aim of documenting a situation in evolution, by mapping out a panorama of contemporary Italian art of the two decades preceding 2008.

The 15ª Q, as it is called on the cover of the catalogue and on the publicity materials connected to the manifestation, cost about two million euro and had some 30,000 visitors during the 76 days that it was open.

== The exhibition ==
The aim of the exhibition is to trace out a map of the main results of the artistic research conducted in Italy during the two decades prior to 2008 as well as of the experiences considered representative of that period, devoting particular attention to the artists in the middle of their careers and the younger ones, indicative of the possible future evolution of the Italian artistic panorama. The exhibition registers the different tendencies of contemporary art in which conceptual art, minimalism, and the various tendencies of the pictorial and photographic image are confronted in a further attempt to identify the possible singularities of the Italian situation in the international system of art.

Ninety-nine artists have been invited, each with a single recent work, in many cases created for the occasion. Painting, photography, video art, sculpture, installations and net art are the expressions that have been adopted in the exhibition in proportions that are not homogeneous. The artists participating have an average age of forty-five years, one-quarter of them are under thirty-five and a third are women.

The XV Rome Quadrennial has been dedicated to the memory of Luciano Fabro: his sculpture Autunno (Autumn), exhibited here for the first time, opens the exhibition in the Sala della Rotonda of Palazzo delle Esposizioni.

During the exhibition period, the educational services of the Palazzo delle Esposizioni, in collaboration with the Faculty of Letters and Philosophy of the Sapienza University of Rome, have organized meetings between the artists and the public in the sphere of thematic visits.

== Committee members and installation ==
A committee of curators and art historians, composed of Chiara Bertola, Lorenzo Canova, Bruno Corà, Daniela Lancioni and Claudio Spadoni, is responsible for the critical installation of the exhibition as well as the choice of artists to invite to participate. The itinerary of the exhibition extends over 3,000 square metres on the three levels of Palazzo delle Esposizioni, Giulio Turchetta has organized the installation.

== Artists ==
The following artists were featured at the 15th Rome Quadriennale:

- Mario Airò
- Carolina Raquel Antich
- Andrea Aquilanti
- Stefano Arienti
- Sergia Avveduti
- Massimo Bartolini
- Matteo Basilé
- Alessandro Bazan
- Vanessa Beecroft
- Angelo Bellobono
- Elisabetta Benassi
- Manfredi Beninati
- Stefano Boccalini
- Francesco Bocchini
- Stefano Bonacci
- Giuseppe Caccavale
- Alessandro Cannistrà
- Gea Casolaro
- Antonio Catelani
- Alice Cattaneo
- Loris Cecchini
- Francesco Cervelli
- Paolo Chiasera
- Claudio Citterio
- Marco Colazzo
- Luca Costantini
- Francesco De Grandi
- Daniela De Lorenzo
- Giulio De Mitri
- Fabrice de Nola
- Alberto Di Fabio
- Anna Di Febo
- Elisabetta Di Maggio
- Andrea Di Marco
- Rä di Martino
- Fulvio Di Piazza
- Mauro Di Silvestre
- Valentino Diego
- Bruna Esposito
- Stefania Fabrizi
- Luciano Fabro
- David Fagioli
- Lara Favaretto
- Flavio Favelli
- Danilo Fiorucci
- Simona Frillici
- Paolo Grassino
- Alice Guareschi
- Debora Hirsch
- Irena Kalođera
- Karpüseeler
- Deborah Logorio
- Federico Lombardo
- Claudia Losi
- Serenella Lupparelli
- Andrea Mastrovito
- Vittoria Mazzoni
- Sabrina Mezzaqui
- Matteo Montani
- Diego Morandini
- Maria Morganti
- Liliana Moro
- Adriano Nardi
- Marco Neri
- Davide Nido
- Adrian Paci
- Luca Pancrazzi
- Marina Paris
- Luana Perilli
- Perino & Vele
- Diego Perrone
- Paola Pivi
- Piero Pompili
- Franco Pozzi
- Luisa Protti
- Daniele Puppi
- Luisa Rabbia
- Antonio Riello
- Giovanni Rizzoli
- Bernhard Rüdiger
- Andrea Salvino
- Mariateresa Sartori
- Maurizio Savini
- Francesco Simeti
- Sissi
- Federico Solmi
- Vittorio Sopracase
- Donatella Spaziani
- Stalker/ON
- Giuseppe Stampone
- Giovanni Termini
- Alessandra Tesi
- Silvano Tessarollo
- Grazia Toderi
- Stefano Tondo
- Luca Trevisani
- Erich Turroni
- Nico Vascellari
- Nicola Verlato
- Marco Verrelli

== Jury and Prizes ==
For the first time in the history of the Rome Quadrennial, the jury, composed of Suzanne Pagé, Director of the Foundation Louis-Vuitton, Gerald Matt, Director of the Kunsthalle of Vienna and Vicente Todolí, Director of the Tate Modern of London, is not Italian.

On 12 September 2008, the Prize Jury of the XV Quadrennial awarded the Quadrennial Prize (20,000 euro) to Adrian Paci, and the Prize for Young Art (10,000 euro) to Deborah Ligorio. Both Adrian Paci and Deborah Ligorio have participated with video art works.

A career prize (a gold medal) was awarded to Maurizio Cattelan. On 24 March 2009, at the MAXXI of Rome, the singer Elio of the Elio e le Storie Tese, who announced that he was the real Cattelan, came to receive the prize, making witty remarks and answering questions from Francesco Prosperetti, Anna Mattirolo, Gino Agnese, Stefano Chiodi, Andrea Cortellessa, Cornelia Lauf and the public that was present.

== Catalogue ==
The exhibition is documented by a catalogue of the works of 320 pages published by Marsilio. The volume opens with critical essays by Chiara Bertola, Lorenzo Canova, Bruno Corà, Daniela Lancioni and Claudio Spadoni.

Along the itinerary of the exhibition, it is possible to consult a tactile screen with images of the works and entries about the artists edited by Paola Bonani for the Quadriennale Foundation.

== Related exhibitions ==
During the 15th Quadriennale, a documentary exhibition of the history of the Quadrennial of Rome has been installed in the Spazio Fontana of Palazzo delle Esposizioni. This exhibition has been organized by the Archive of the Quadriennale Foundation in collaboration with the Istituto Luce and RAI Teche.

== See also ==
- Rome Quadriennale
- Venice Biennale
- Farnesina Experimenta Art Collection
