= Farnesina =

Farnesina may refer to:

== Architecture ==
- Casa della Farnesina, an historic building of the ancient Rome, in the neighborhood of Trastevere, Rome
- Palazzo della Farnesina, the headquarters of Ministry of Foreign Affairs of the government of the Republic of Italy
- Villa Farnesina, a Renaissance suburban villa in the neighborhood of Trastevere, Rome

== Art collections ==
- The Farnesina Experimenta Art Collection, a contemporary Italian art collection exhibited at the Palazzo della Farnesina, Rome, Italy
- The Collezione Farnesina, a 20th-century Italian art collection exhibited at the Palazzo della Farnesina, Rome, Italy

== Places ==
- Farnesina (district of Rome) a district of Rome, Italy

== Institutions ==
- The Ministry of Foreign Affairs (Italy), also known as the Farnesina, as a metonym from its headquarters, the Palazzo della Farnesina in Rome
