= Roman Construction Sites =

Cantieri Romani Roman Construction Sites
- Author: Arnaldo Romani Brizzi, Ludovico Pratesi.
- Language: Italian, English
- Series: Architettura, Urbanistica, Ambiente
- Subject: Rome, Italian Contemporary art, Architecture, Urbanism
- Genre: Catalogue
- Publisher: Gangemi Editore
- Publication date: 2001
- Publication place: Italy
- Pages: 78
- ISBN: 88-492-0151-6
- OCLC: 48098712
- LC Class: ND620 .C36 2001

Cantieri Romani – Roman construction sites (in Italian and English text on the facing page) is a publication that accompanies the exhibition of the same name held in 2001 at the Galleria Comunale d'Arte Moderna e Contemporanea (today MACRO) of Rome.

== The book ==
The volume is an unusual document that describes some of the construction sites open in Rome in view of the Jubilee of 2000, through the pictorial testimonies of twenty artists operating in the city.

For the preparation of the Great Jubilee marking the end of the second millennium, from about seven hundred to one thousand building sites were opened in Rome an effort that was unprecedented in the second half of the 20th century except for the works realized for the 1960 Olympic Games. At that time, Mario Mafai, Afro, Giuseppe Capogrossi and many other artists made paintings of Rome and the changes it was undergoing.

On the occasion of this second change of the city, Andrea Aquilanti, Carlo Bertocci, Enzo Cucchi, Fabrice de Nola, Stefano Di Stasio, Paolo Fiorentino, Daniele Galliano, Paola Gandolfi, Federico Guida, Felice Levini, Massimo Livadiotti, Fabio Mauri, Giorgio Ortona, Federico Pietrella, Luca Pignatelli, Cristiano Pintaldi, Piero Pizzi Cannella, Gioacchino Pontrelli, Mauro Reggio and Francesca Tulli, while remaining faithful to their own aesthetics, limited themselves to paintings whose images attest to the ongoing changes and, in contrast with their predecessors of 1960, this time are devoid of any nostalgic spirit.

The book contains colour reproductions of the twenty works, biographical entries of the artists edited by Sabrina Vedovotto and two essays:

- Roman Construction Sites by Arnaldo Romani Brizzi,
- Roman Construction Sites, the reasons for an exhibition by Ludovico Pratesi.

== See also ==
- Rome
- Great Jubilee
- Jubilee

== Editions ==
Arnaldo Romani Brizzi, Ludovico Pratesi. Cantieri Romani. Series: Architettura, Urbanistica, Ambiente. Roma, Gangemi Editore, 2001, pp. 78. ISBN 88-492-0151-6
