= Imprinter =

An imprinter may mean:

- Credit card imprinter, a mechanical device for transfer of payment card details to paper
- Imprinter (Dune), a type of fictional character in Frank Herbert's Dune universe

== See also ==
- Imprint (disambiguation)
