= Epitome (disambiguation) =

An epitome is a summary or miniature form.

Epitome may also refer to:

- Epitome (film), a 1953 Japanese film
- Epitome (album), a 1993 album by saxophonist Odean Pope
- Epitome (data processing), a condensed digital representation of statistical properties
- Epitome Pictures, a Canadian television production company
- Epitome (horse), a Thoroughbred racehorse
