= Luciano Fabro =

Italian sculptor and artist (1936–2007)

- Born: November 20, 1936; Turin, Italy
- Died: June 22, 2007 (aged 71); Milan, Italy
- Known for: Sculpture, Literature
- Movement: Arte Povera

Luciano Fabro (November 20, 1936 – June 22, 2007) was an Italian sculptor, conceptual artist and writer associated with the Arte Povera movement.

== Life ==
Fabro was born in Turin, and he moved to Udine, in the Friuli region after his father's death. He was influenced by artists such as Yves Klein, and Lucio Fontana; he was also close to the artists involved in Azimut, such as Piero Manzoni and Enrico Castellani. In 1958, after he saw Fontana's work at Venice Biennale, Fabro moved to Milan where he spent the rest of his life pursuing his artistic career.

Fabro was involved in the Arte Povera group, which was interested in experimenting with industrial and natural materials, focusing on process, language and the body. Fabro's best known works were sculptural reliefs of Italy made out of glass, steel, bronze, gold and even soft leather. The signature unorthodox, 'poor' materials in his works include steel tubes, cloth, newspapers, and wax; the artist, however, often used also traditional and expensive art materials such as gold, marble, and bronze.

He died on 22 June 2007 in Milan following a heart attack.

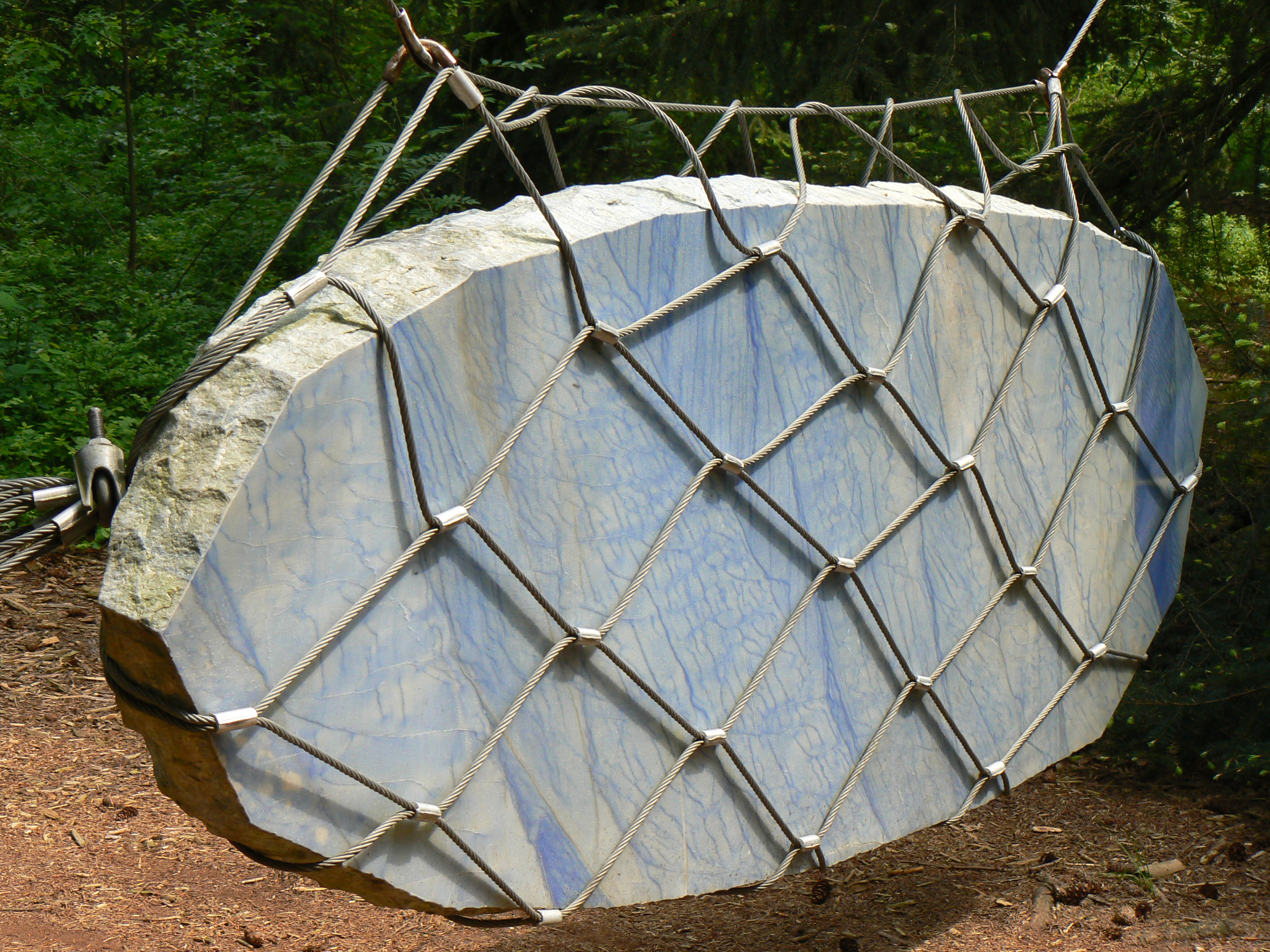
La doppia faccia del cielo (1986)

== Work ==
One of Fabro's first pieces was called Tubo da mettere tra i fiori (Tube to place among flowers), 1963. It was a site-specific installation designed for a Milanese garden, even if it was never displayed there; it was made of telescopic steel tubes. He made several works that deal with steel tubes in dialogue with basic physical laws of nature. In 1965 he had his first solo show, at the Galleria Vismara, in Milan, where he combined mirror pieces with spatial lines. Around 1966, he began to make performative works such as Indumenti: posaseni, calzari, bandoliera (Garments: bra, boots, cross-belt), 1966; Allestimento Teatrale (Cube di specchi) Theatrical Staging (Cube of Mirrors), 1967-1975; and Pavimento/Tautologia (Floor/ Tautology), 1967.

In 1967, Fabro had a group show called Arte Povera e Im Spazio, which was a show in Genoa featuring artists such as Giulio Paolini, Pino Pascali, and Jannis Kounellis. There Fabro began to expand his response to unorthodox materials such as marbles and silks. Beginning in 1968, he produced a series of works that dealt with Italy, which included Italia rovesciata (Overturned Italy), 1968. This work was inspired by a geographical shape of the country or the familiar form of Italy.

... My 'Italys' are bound to iconography with a very slender thread, which is the case because the image of 'Italy' is an image that is inferred, a graphic image. This is the reason for choosing a refraction of the form which could tend towards the infinite. Italy exist as an image which prompts someone's recognition, as an image for someone who is some way feels connected to it and has something to do with the symbol which is its moral reduction: the reduction of the to a graphic form.

In 2013, it was widely reported that one of his works, Impronta (1962-1964), was accidentally knocked over and smashed by a journalist from Radiotelevisione svizzera, while it was on display at the Meno Uno gallery in Lugano, Switzerland. The journalist was reported to have been intoxicated.

=== Sculptures ===
- Series of works:
  - Italie.
  - Tautologie.
  - Piedi.
  - Habitat.
  - Attaccapanni.
  - Arcobaleni.
- Autunno. On the first anniversary of his death, the 15th Rome Quadriennale has been dedicated to the memory of Luciano Fabro: his sculpture Autunno, exhibited for the first time in Italy, opens the exhibition in the Sala della Rotonda of Palazzo delle Esposizioni.

=== Books ===
- Letture parallele (1973–75)
- Attaccapanni (1978)
- Regole d'arte (1980)
- Vademecum (1980–1996)
- Arte torna Arte. Lezioni e Conferenze 1981 - 1997 (1999)
- Art body (2006)

== See also ==
- 15th Rome Quadriennale
- Imprint (sculpture)

== Sources ==
- Luciano Fabro, Lorenzo Canova, Chiara Bertola, Bruno Corà, Daniela Lancioni, Claudio Spadoni. XV Quadriennale di Roma. Venezia, Marsilio Editori, 2008. ISBN 88-317-9532-5.
- Silvia Fabro, Rudi Fuchs. Luciano Fabro - Didactica magna minima moralia. Milan, Electa, 2007. ISBN 9788837057817.
- Karl Ruhrberg, Schneckenburger, Fricke, Honnef. Kunst des 20. Jahrhunderts. Köln Benedikt Taschen Verlag, 2000. ISBN 3-8228-6029-8.
- Thérèse Legierse, Kristof Reulens Luciano Fabro - From Contratto Sociale to Colonna di Genk. His 16 publicly commissioned works. Ghent MER. Paper Kunsthalle, 2013. ISBN 9789490693626.
