= Imprint =

Imprint or imprinting may refer to:

== Entertainment ==
- Imprint (TV series), Canadian television series
- "Imprint" (Masters of Horror), episode of TV show Masters of Horror
- Imprint (film), a 2007 independent drama/thriller film
- Imprint Entertainment, film and TV production and management company
- Imprint Records, American country music record label
- Imprint (John Patitucci album), jazz album
- Imprint (Vision of Disorder album), 1998 album
- ”Imprint”, a song by Zayn from his 2018 album Icarus Falls
- Imprint label, a recording trade name

== Publishing and journalism ==
- Imprint, British publishing term for impressum, which is comparable to American masthead
- Imprint (trade name), publisher's trade name under which works are published
- Imprint (typeface), typeface commissioned from Monotype by the London publishers of The Imprint
- Imprinted stamp, a stamp printed onto a piece of postal stationery
- The Imprint (printing trade periodical), printed in London in 9 issues in 1913
- Imprint (newspaper), a student newspaper of the University of Waterloo, in Ontario, Canada
- Imprint, a part of Macmillan Publishers Children's Publishing Group.

== Science ==
- Molecular imprinting, in polymer chemistry
- Imprinting (psychology), in psychology and ethology
- Video imprint, in video content analysis of computer vision
- High-level human behavior
  - IMPRINT (Improved Performance Research Integration Tool), human performance modeling tool based on MANPRINT, developed by U.S. Army
  - Imprinting (organizational theory), in organizational theory and organizational behavior
- Unconscious physiological processes:
  - Genomic imprinting (genetic imprinting), mechanism of regulating gene expression
  - Metabolic imprinting, phenomenon by which the metabolism of a developing fetus may be "programmed" during gestation

== Other uses ==
- Imprint (sculpture), a glass sculpture made by Luciano Fabro
- Imprint (falconry), a raptor hand-reared from hatching by humans

== See also ==
- Impr.
- Imprimatur
