= Pignatelli =

Pignatelli (Italian pronunciation: [piɲɲaˈtɛlli]) is an Italian surname which may refer to:

== People ==
- House of Pignatelli, an aristocratic family of Naples
- Fabio Pignatelli (born 1953), an Italian musician
- Faustina Pignatelli (1705–1769), Italian scientist
- Luca Pignatelli (born 1962), an Italian artist
- Luciana Pignatelli (1935–2008), Italian jewelry designer
- William Pignatelli (born 1959), an American state politician from Massachusetts

== Places ==
- Villa Pignatelli, a museum in Naples
- Santa Maria Assunta dei Pignatelli, a church in Naples
