= Stampone =

Stampone is an Italian surname. Notable people with the surname include:

- Atilio Stampone (1926–2022), Argentine pianist and composer
- Giuseppe Stampone (born 1974), French-born visual artist
