= Fabrice de Nola =

Italian-Belgian artist (born 1964)

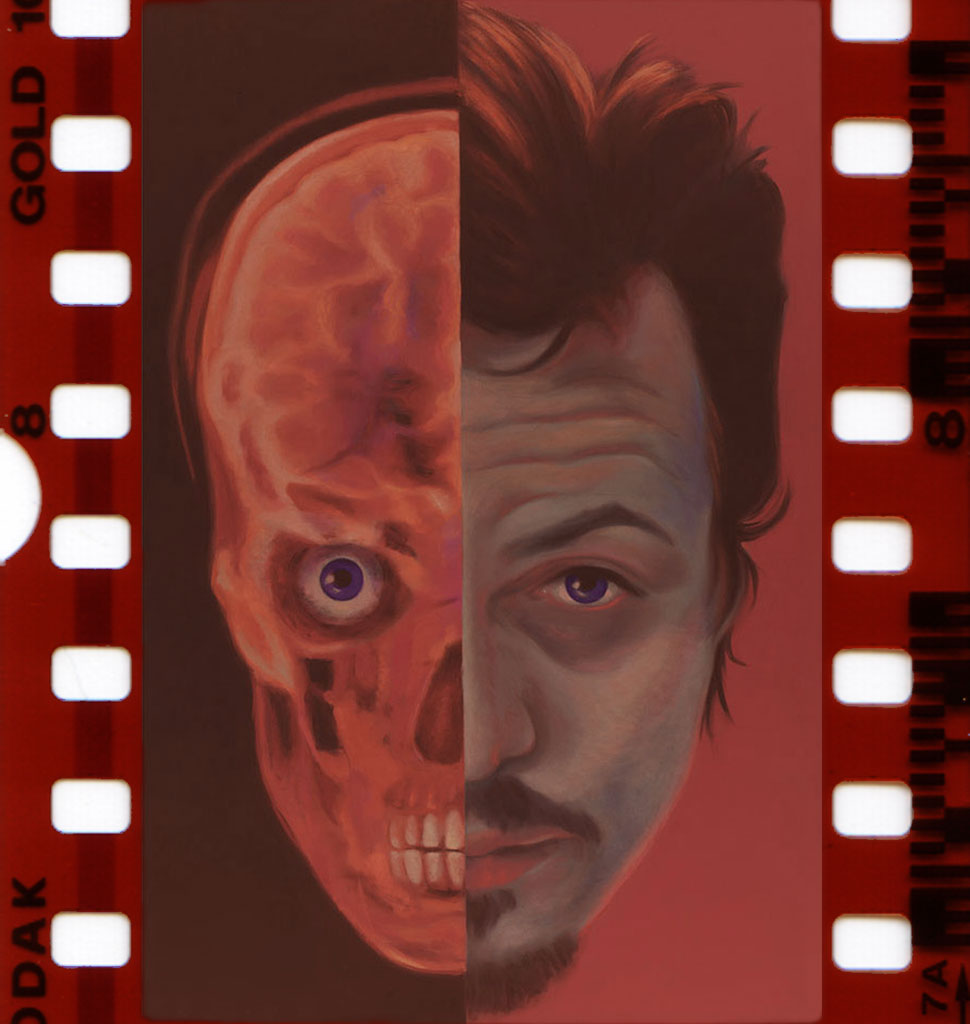
- Fabrice de Nola, Self-portrait in negative, 1999 (oil on canvas, reproduction on negative film).
- Born: 1964 (age 61–62); Messina, Italy
- Known for: Conceptual art, painting, photography

Fabrice de Nola (born 1964) is an Italian-Belgian artist. He introduced the use of QR codes in oil paintings. In 2006, he created the first oil paintings containing texts and web connections to be used on mobile phones.

== Biography ==
The son of an Italian mother and a Belgian father, Fabrice de Nola was born in Messina in 1964 and lived in Messina until 1981. He attended the Art school in Palermo, but left after one year in order to pursue his interest in photography. At the end of the 1980s he moved to Milan, and thereafter to Mechelen, his father's hometown.

In the mid-1980s he worked as a scene-painter in Geneva, Cairo and Rome. In those early years, he used photocopiers and photography as techniques in support of his painting. In the mid-1990s, the computer became an essential tool for the preparation and pre-production of his paintings.

In 1996, he showed at the Il Ponte Contemporanea Gallery in Rome where he remained until the year 2000.

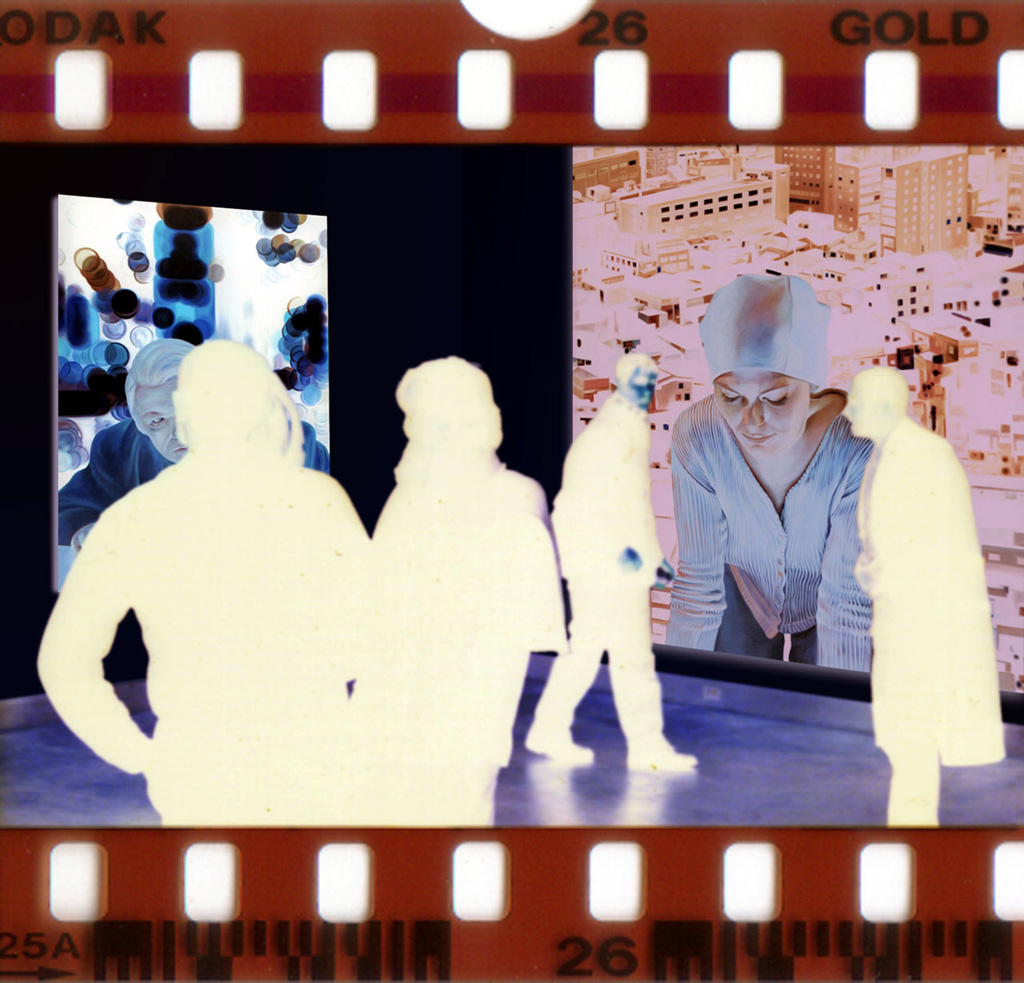
Inverse, installation view, New York, 1997. 35 mm negative film.

In 1997, Fabio Sargentini invited Fabrice de Nola to the Palermo exhibition Giro d'Italia dell'Arte curated by Demetrio Paparoni, a survey of young Italian artists, at the l’Attico Gallery. That same year he participated in Roma, 4 young painters, which showed four Roman painters and was curated by Fabio Sargentini at the Generous Miracles Gallery in New York.

In 1999, during the 48th Biennal of Venice, he exhibited in Authoritratti italiani at the Fondazione Bevilacqua La Masa. Posters were put up at that time in Venice reproducing his works. De Nola painted a self-portrait using photographs, CT and X-rays: painted on one half is his face, while on the other half the interior is visible, showing skull, muscles, eyeball and brain.

In 2000, he took part in two group shows in Rome: Lungo il muro del Gasometro at the Teatro India Gallery and Giganti at the Imperial Forum of Nerva. He also showed that year in Sui generis at the PAC in Milan.

In 2001, he created a work on the building site of the Auditorium of Rome. The painting was commissioned by the Ministry of Culture for the permanent collection of MACRO. That same year he participated in the Le Muse inquietanti at the Pascali Museum in Bari and Dalla Mini al mini at the Palazzo delle Esposizioni in Rome.

In 2003, de Nola showed his Neural Pro project in a one-man show at Palazzo Isnello at Il Genio of Palermo. In Rome he exhibited the series Air Ocean at the Teatro Umberto and two large canvases from the Cerasi Collection at the Cloister of Bramante. The Italian Ministry of Foreign Affairs invited him to the Futuro italiano exhibition at the European Parliament in Brussels.

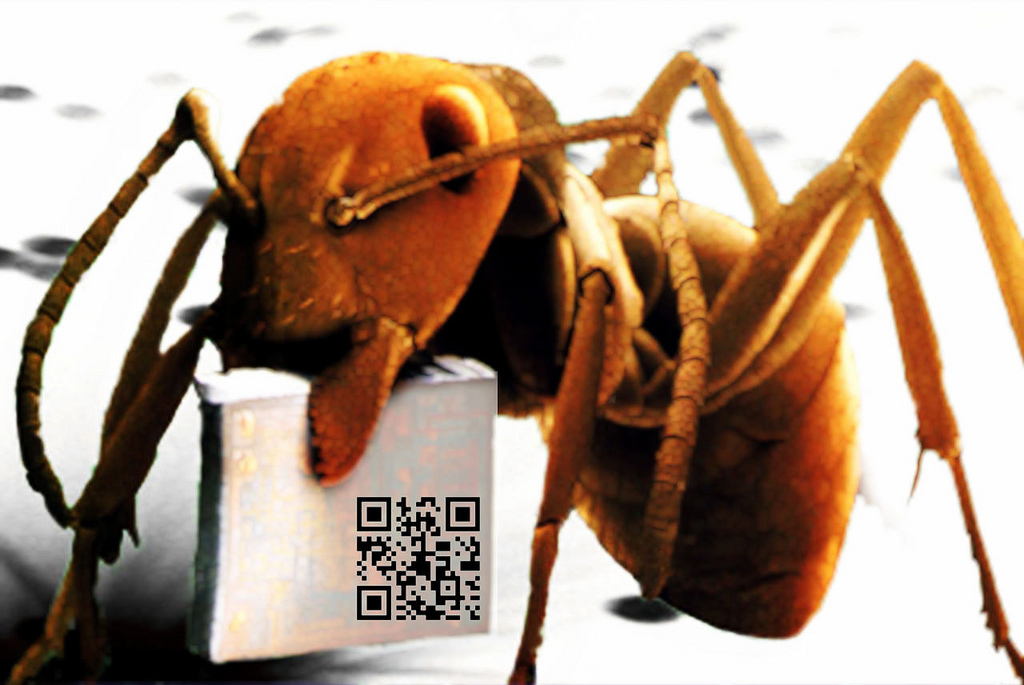
Bottom up, oil on canvas, 2006

In 2006, he created the first oil painting using painted QR code. The work has been exhibited the same year in Milan. In 2007, the Ministry of Foreign Affairs commissioned two works from him for the Farnesina Experimenta Art Collection.

In 2008, he participated in the VII International Festival of Photography of Rome with his show Skip Life, and he was also invited to the 15th Rome Quadriennale where he presented an advertising installation for the fake Neural Pro Company.

== Projects and works ==
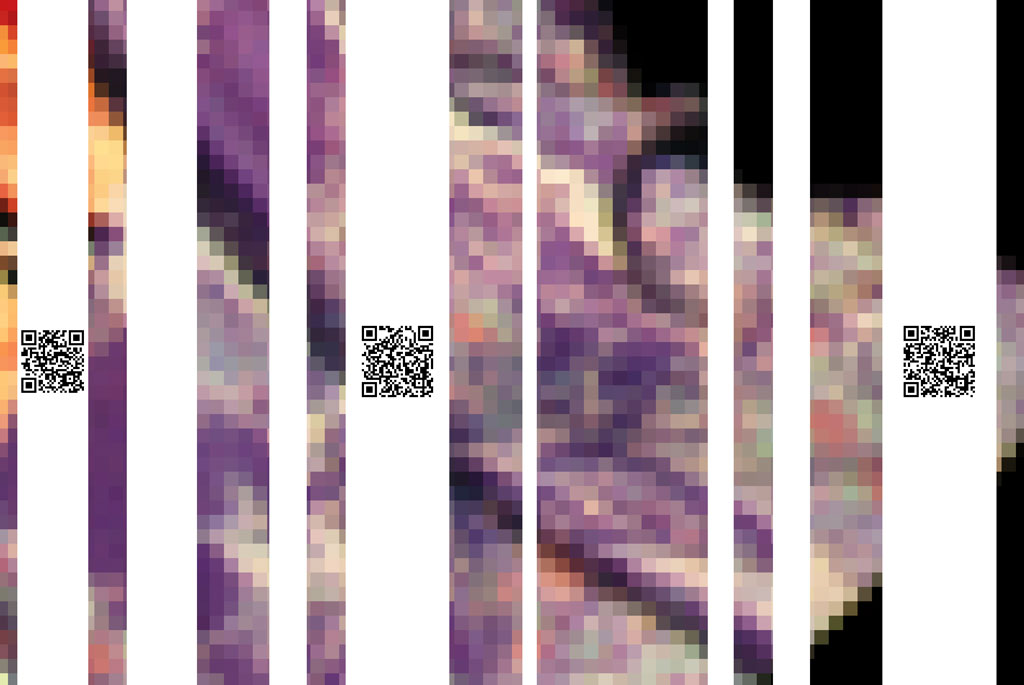
Still (Mirror Edit), closer view on QR codes

- In 1997, inspired by Andrei Rublev, he painted a negative image, which he photographed in order to see its positive effect on film. The following year he exhibited part of the project Inverse at the Galleria Il Ponte Contemporanea of Rome. The works are diptychs composed of a negative oil painting and the positive of its photographic reproduction. In 2007, the MLAC (Contemporary Art Lab Museum) of the Sapienza University of Rome showed his first large painting of the Inverse cycle.
- In 1999, he started the ecological project Oceano Aria and the project Antennaria on digital identities. Antennaria was inspired by the Echelon affair and, in 2000, the Il Ponte Contemporanea Gallery of Rome showed some works at the solo show Backdoors.
- Since 2003 he has been working on the Neural Pro project, which simulates the existence of a data-processing and biotechnological multinational whose products integrate with the human body creating a man-machine interface without external body devices. He held two conferences on this subject in 2008: Prospects of Web Evolution at Palazzo delle Esposizioni during the XV Quadriennale, and Mind-Machine Symbiosis, at the Faculty of Sociology of the Sapienza University of Rome. The idea was presented at the Google competition Project 10^{100} (10 to the 100th) with the name of HI (Human Interface).
- In 2006, he initiated the Active project, in order to make painted works communicate with mobile phones. The project, in the spirit of the Internet of Things, makes use of QR codes painted in oil or embedded in photos, containing texts and mobile web links.

== See also ==
- Semacode
