= Marco Cingolani =

Italian painter (born 1961)

Marco Cingolani (born 1961) is an Italian painter.

== Biography ==
Cingolani was born in Como, Italy, in 1961. He attended the artistic high school in Como and the Brera Academy of Fine Arts, where he graduated in 1984. In 1978 he moved to Milan, where he got into the local underground scene, where art mixed with fashion and punk music, hanging out with fellow artists such as Alessandro Pessoli, Massimo Kaufmann, and Stefano Arienti. This period resulted in a change in his artistic style. In addition to referencing history of art, literature and sacred texts, Cingolani began to include socio-political commentaries in his work, and address how events are portrayed in the media. Some of Cingolani's most well-known paintings are the series related to news events from the late 1970s/early 1980s, such as the series of Le Interviste (the Interviews, 1990–1993), L’Attentato al Papa (the Pope's Assassination Attempt, 1990) and Il ritrovamento del corpo di Aldo Moro (The Discovery of the Body of Aldo Moro, 1989).

Cingolani has held exhibitions in several institutions such as the Pecci Museum in Prato; Palazzo Strozzi in Florence; Stedelijk Museum voor Actuele Kunst in Ghent; Padiglione d'Arte Contemporanea in Milan; and the GAMeC in Bergamo. In 2009, he exhibited at the 53rd Venice Biennale. In 2011, on the occasion of Cingolani's 50th anniversary, an exhibition in three distinct institutional sites (Broletto, Pinacoteca Civica, Biblioteca Comunale) was organized in his birthplace, Como.

Cingolani lives and works in Milan, where he teaches painting at the Brera Academy.
