= Epitome (data processing) =

An epitome, in data processing, is a condensed digital representation of the essential statistical properties of ordered datasets such as matrices that represent images, audio signals, videos or genetic sequences. Although much smaller than the data, the epitome contains many of its smaller overlapping parts with much less repetition and with some level of generalization. As such, it can be used in tasks such as data mining, machine learning and signal processing.

The first use of epitomic analysis was with image textures for the purposes of image parsing. Epitomes have also been used in video processing to replace, remove or superresolve imagery.

Epitomes are also being investigated as tools for vaccine design.

== See also ==
- Image processing
- Video imprint (computer vision)
