= Luca Pignatelli =

Italian artist (born 1962)

Luca Pignatelli (born 22 June 1962) is an Italian artist.

== Biography ==
Luca Pignatelli was born in 1962 in Milan, where he currently lives and works in a home-studio, self-designed and based on a former industrial building.

His work focuses on a constant process of gathering, recovery and elaboration of history and art. He combines and reworks a wide iconographic archive of universal images, both abstract and figurative, from antique and contemporary scenes, defined by art criticism as "Theatre of memory".

Since the beginning of his artistic career, in 1987, Pignatelli has painted his now-famous Roman and Greek statues, classical heads of Aphrodite and Diana, mythological figures of gods, heroes and emperors, besides skylines of New York skyscrapers, Renaissance squares, Alpine landscapes and icons of modernity such as Second-World-War airplanes, ocean-liners and steam trains.

Luca Pignatelli's artistic journey is underpinned by his own fascination and exploration of archaeology and mythology. (...) From the faces of Attic statues to a Sixties Ferrari (...) Pignatelli could have been a film-maker, but he is an artist of material things".

Pignatelli is also renowned for his research and use of railway wagon tarpaulins, woods, papers, metals and rugs: diverse and recovered materials which he reworks through tears, cuts and stitching.

Since the Eighties he has become firmly established and his work has been exhibited in Italy and internationally, hosted by prestigious museums, showcasing large-scale paintings and site-specific installations.

Among his exhibitions we cite: in 2009, his solo show "Atlantis" at Musée d’Art Modern et Contemporain in Nice and the participation to the Italian Pavilion at the 53rd Venice Biennale. In 2011, his works were exhibited in Rome at the National Institute for Graphic Art.

In 2014 the Capodimonte Museum in Naples hosted his show titled "Luca Pignatelli", resulting in the donation of the large-scale painting Pompei to the permanent contemporary art collection of the museum. The Uffizi Gallery in Florence hosted "Migrants" in the Vasari Corridor in 2015.

Most recently, after John Currin's and Glenn Brown's monographic retrospectives, Bardini Museum in Florence hosted "Senza Data", a breakthrough exhibition specifically conceived for the halls of the museum.

Through the decades the artist has received a wide recognition from the art world and respected critics have written about his artworks, including Donald Kuspit, Achille Bonito Oliva, Sergio Risaliti, Carlo Arturo Quintavalle, Marina Fokidis.

== Work ==
Pignatelli's imagination feeds on antiquities, nature, and the connection between the concepts of Time and History. While his first production conveyed the perception of a looming menace, of the quiet moment announcing a disaster, his later work is often characterized by a sense of universality and a more complex historical reflection.

The City and the History of Art represent for the artist a sort of permanent setting to human events, but nonetheless a dimension where Pignatelli engages his artistic research, operating analogies as well as modifications.

Pignatelli's practice drives him to visit warehouses, storage areas, military depots and large building sites, towards which he has always been inspired by in his works.

He is fascinated by the anonymous architectures of port cities, with their construction sites and movement of goods; by the works of Vignola, Loos and Mies van der Rohe, encountered during his travels across European cities; by Milan, his native city and place of choice; and with New York, where he sojourned for long periods since 1986.

== Exhibitions ==
=== Solo exhibitions ===
- Muse. Luca Pignatelli in der Glyptothek, Glyptothek München, Munich (2024);
- Luca Pignatelli, MEF - Museo Ettore Fico, Turin (2022), curated by Luca Beatrice;
- Luca Pignatelli - In un luogo dove gli opposti stanno, Galleria Poggiali, Florence (2019), curated by Sergio Risaliti;
- Luca Pignatelli - Senza Data, Museo Stefano Bardini, Florence (2019), curated by Sergio Risaliti
- Luca Pignatelli - Recent Works, Senesi contemporanea, London (2018);
- Luca Pignatelli – Persepoli. Riflessi del residuo. Teatro La Fenice, Venice (2017);
- Luca Pignatelli, Fondazione Giorgio Conti (Palazzo Cucchiari), Carrara (2017);
- Luca Pignatelli – Blue Note/Opere su carta, GAM Galleria civica d’arte moderna e contemporanea, Turin (2015);
- Luca Pignatelli – Migranti, Galleria degli Uffizi, Florence (2015);
- Luca Pignatelli, Museo di Capodimonte, Napoli (2014), curated by Achille Bonito Oliva;
- Luca Pignatelli – Icons Unplugged, Istituto Nazionale della Grafica, Rome (2011), curated by Antonella Renzitti;
- Luca Pignatelli – Sculture/Analogie, Galleria Poggiali e Forconi, Florece (2010), curated by Marina Fokidis
- Luca Pignatelli – Atlantis, MAMAC, Musée d’Art Moderne et d’Art Contemporain, Nice (2009), a cura di Gilbert Perlein e Hélène Depotte;
- Luca Pignatelli, Museo Archeologico Nazionale, Naples (2008), curated by Achille Bonito Oliva;
- Luca Pignatelli. Paintings, Teatro India, Rome (2007), curated by Achille Bonito Oliva;
- Luca Pignatelli - Between raverie and dream, Generous Miracles Gallery, New York (2000), curated by Donald Kuspit.
- Luca Pignatelli, Galerie Daniel Templon, Paris (2005);
- Luca Pignatelli, Limn Friedlander Gallery, San Francisco (1999).

=== Collective exhibitions ===
- Scenes of New York City: The Elie and Sarah Hirschfeld Collection, New York Historical Society Museum, New York (2021);
- REVOLUTIONS 1989–2019. L'arte del mondo nuovo 30 anni dopo, Castel Sismondo, Rimini (2019);
- Porti Possibili. Sei artisti per l'accoglienza, Santa Giulia Museum, Brescia (2019);
- Ascoltare bellezza, Biblioteca Classense – Sala del mosaico, Ravenna (2018);
- WORK IN PROGRESS. San Patrignano, la collezione, La Triennale di Milano, Milano (2018);
- Mediterraneo lo specchio dell'altro, Palazzo Reale, Milano (2018);
- Arte contro la corruzione, Casa Testori Associazione Culturale, Novate Milanese (2017);
- Imago Mundi – Contemporary Artist from Italy at Cini Foundation in Venice e Sandretto Re Rebaudengo in Turin (2015);
- Fuoco nero. Materia e struttura dopo Burri, Palazzo della Pilotta, Parma (2014);
- Ri-conoscere Michelangelo, Galleria dell’Accademia, Florence (2014);
- Coexistence, The Jerusalem Foundation, Museo MAXXI, Rome (2010);
- Collaudi, 53ª International Contemporary Art Exhibition of Venice, Italian Pavilion, Venice, 2009;
- Opere scelte, MACRO Museum, Rome (2007);
- Sui Generis, PAC – Contemporary Art Pavilion, Milan (2000);
- Tokyo Travelling Exhibition, International Forum, Tokyo (1997);
- Ultime generazioni, XII Quadriennale d’Arte di Roma, Palazzo delle Esposizioni, Rome, (1996).

== Museums and collections ==
Luca Pignatelli's works are included in the following permanent collections:

- Museo Nazionale di Capodimonte, Naples, features Pompei (2014) in its collection dedicated to contemporary art.
- Galleria degli Uffizi, Florence, features Autoritratto come Mitridate (2014–2015) among its selection of artists’ self-portraits.
- CSAC – Centro Studi e Archivi della Comunicazione dell’Università di Parma, Parma, houses Lotta (2014).
- GAM – Galleria civica d’Arte Moderna e contemporanea, Turin, houses seven paper works from the series Standard (2000–2015).
- PART – Palazzi dell’Arte di Rimini, Rimini, holds Astratto (2015) and Persepoli (2017) as part of the Fondazione San Patrignano Collection.
- New–York Historical Society, New York, houses two artworks from the series New York, as part of Elie and Sarah Hirschfeld's Collection.

== Other projects ==
Luca Pignatelli is often invited to participate in conferences and debates about art and architecture in universities and institutions. Some of his latest lectures include:

- Galleria M77, Milan, May 2017, "The idea of a sustainable revolution". Speakers: Luca Pignatelli, Luca Beatrice, Michele Bonuomo.
- Politecnico di Milano, January 2015, "Distruction of Construction". Speaker: Luca Pignatelli.
- Naples' Academy of Fine Arts, May 2014, "The sense of classical in contemporary art". Speaker: Luca Pignatelli.

== Bibliography ==
- Luca Pignatelli. Senza Data. Catalogue of the exhibition curated by Sergio Risaliti (Stefano Bardini Museum, Florence, January 25 – March 25, 2019), Florence, Forma Edizioni, 2019.
- Luca Pignatelli, Migranti. Catalogue of the exhibition curated by Antonio Natali, Arturo Carlo Quintavalle, Uffizi Gallery, Florence, 2015.
- Arturo Carlo Quintavalle, Fuoco Nero – Materia e struttura attorno e dopo Burri, Palazzo della Pilotta, Parma, Skira, 2014.
- Achille Bonito Oliva, Michele Bonuomo, Angela Tecce, Fabrizio Vona, Luca Pignatelli, Catalogue of the exhibition at Museo di Capodimonte, Napoli, Arte’m Editore, Napoli, 2014.
- Luca Beatrice, Marina Fokidis, Maria Antonella Fusco, Antonella Renzitti, Salvatore Veca, Icons Unplugged, Istituto Nazionale per la Grafica, Roma, Allemandi Editore, Torino, 2011.
- Marina Fokidis, Luca Pignatelli – Sculture/Analogie, Galleria Poggiali e Forconi, Firenze, Arnoldo Mosca Mondadori Editore Milano, 2010.
- Achille Bonito Oliva, Luca Pignatelli, Catalogue of the exhibition at the National Archaeological Museum in Naples, Electa, 2007.
- Achille Bonito Oliva, Luca Pignatelli – Paintings, Charta, Milano, 2007.
- Donald Kuspit, Luca Pignatelli – Between Reverie and Dream, The Focus Group, New York, 2000.
