= Imprint (sculpture) =

1964 glass sculpture by Luciano Fabro

Imprint (Italian Impronta) was an Arte Povera glass sculpture created by Luciano Fabro in 1964. It was an opaque 74.5 cm diameter, 8mm thick glass disc with an image of the Earth at the centre. The sculpture represented "the longevity of the world."

On September 7, 2013, the piece was accidentally knocked over and smashed by a journalist from Radiotelevisione svizzera, while it was on display at the Meno Uno gallery in Lugano, Switzerland. The journalist was reported to have been intoxicated.
