= Rome Quadriennale =

Museum in Italy

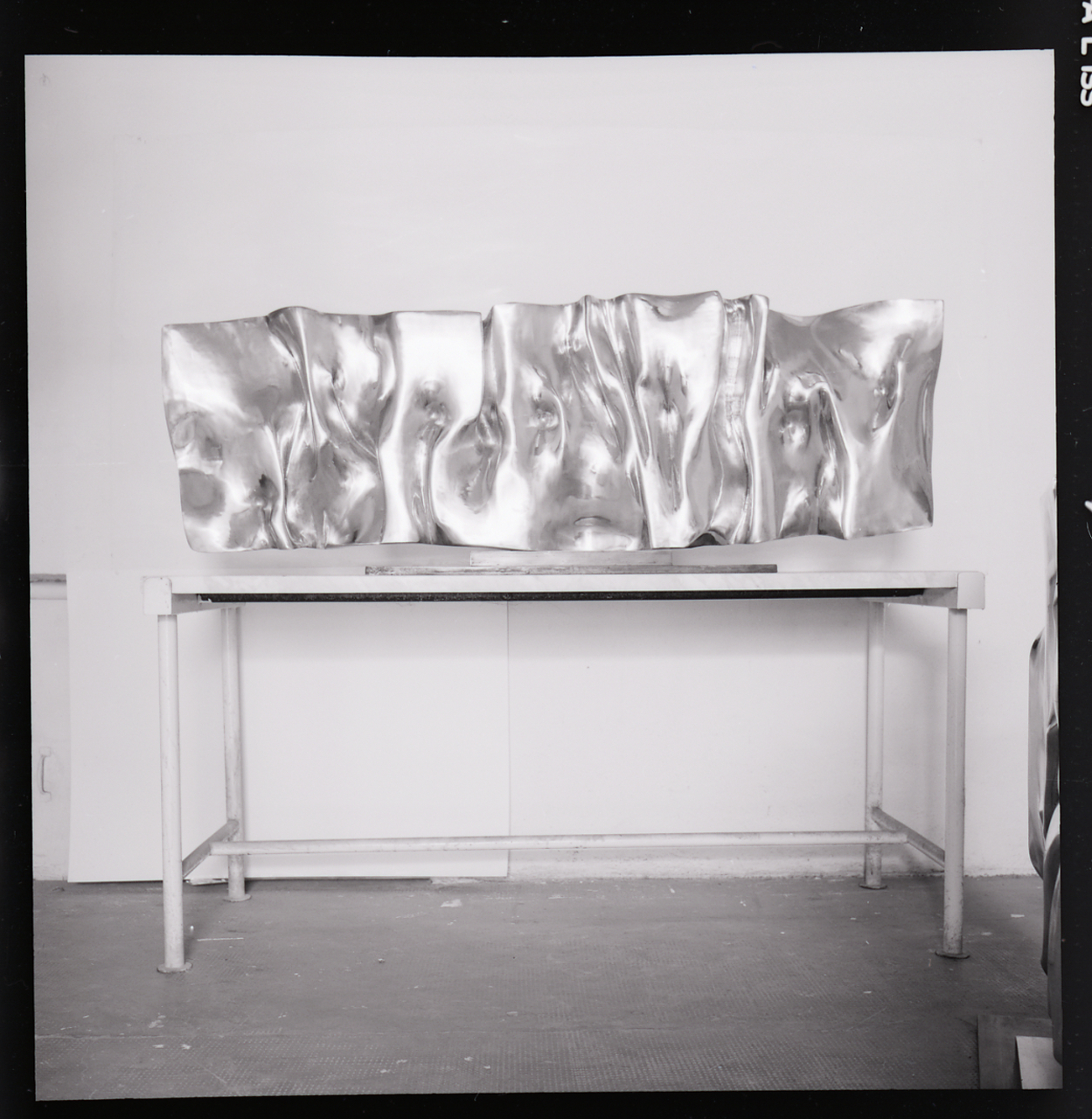
Sculpture by Giò Pomodoro for the 9th Quadriennale nazionale d'arte of Rome. Photo by Paolo Monti.

The Rome Quadriennale (Italian: La Quadriennale di Roma, also called in English the Rome Quadrennial) is the Italian national institution entrusted with the task of researching about and promoting Italian contemporary art. It is a foundation participated by the Italian Ministry of Culture.

Its name derives from the four-yearly exhibitions it is required to host by its constitution. It is based in Rome in the monumental complex of Villa Carpegna.

Founded in 1927 by Cipriano Efisio Oppo, artist, writer, member of Parliament and a director of the art trade union, who directed the first four editions of the Quadriennale with the role of "general secretary".

Between 2018 and 2022 Sara Cosulich has been appointed as first artistic director of the history of the institution.

In 2022, under the artistic direction of Gian Maria Tosatti the activity of the institution started switching its main efforts from the production of the quadriennal exhibition to a constant activity of researches, exhibition programs, collaborations with universities and the publishing of magazines and books. In these last years the institution has begun to collaborate with international curators like Hans Ulrich Obrist or Nadim Samman, or institutions like Fridericianum or Gwangju Biennale.

Villa Carpegna is also the office of the ARBIQ, the archive of Quadriennale, one of the largest archives of Italian contemporary art.

== Exhibitions ==
All the Rome Quadriennale main exhibitions held at its historical site, the Palazzo delle Esposizioni of Rome, except where indicated.

- I Quadriennale, January – June 1931.
- II Quadriennale, February – July 1935.
- III Quadriennale, February–July 1939.
- IV Quadriennale, May–July 1943.
- V Quadriennale, March–May 1948.
- VI Quadriennale, December 1951 – April 1952.
- VII Quadriennale, November 1955 – 1956.
- VIII Quadriennale, December 1959 – April 1960.
- IX Quadriennale, October 1965 – March 1966.
- X Quadriennale, Five exhibitions:
  - November–December 1972.
  - February–March 1973.
  - May–June 1973.
  - March–April 1975.
  - June–July 1977.
- XI Quadriennale, Palazzo dei Congressi, EUR complex, Rome, May–August 1986.
- XII Quadriennale, two exhibitions:
  - July–September 1992.
  - Palazzo delle Esposizioni and the Ala Mazzoniana of the Roma Termini railway station, September – November 1996.
- 1999. XIII Quadriennale, Palazzo delle Esposizioni, June–September 1999.
- XIV Quadriennale three exhibitions:
  - Palazzo Reale, Naples, November 2003–January 2004.
  - Palazzo della Promotrice delle Belle Arti, Turin, January–March 2004.
  - Galleria Nazionale d'Arte Moderna, Rome, March–May 2005.
- XV Quadriennale, June–September 2008.
- XVI Quadriennale – Altri tempi, altri miti, Palazzo delle Esposizioni, Rome, October 2016 – January 2017
- XVII Quadriennale – Fuori, Palazzo delle Esposizioni, Rome, October 2020 – July 2021

== See also ==
- Venice Biennale
- Rome Film Festival
- Cento Pittori via Margutta
