= Museum of Contemporary Art of Rome =

Museum in Italy

- Museo d'Arte Contemporanea di Roma
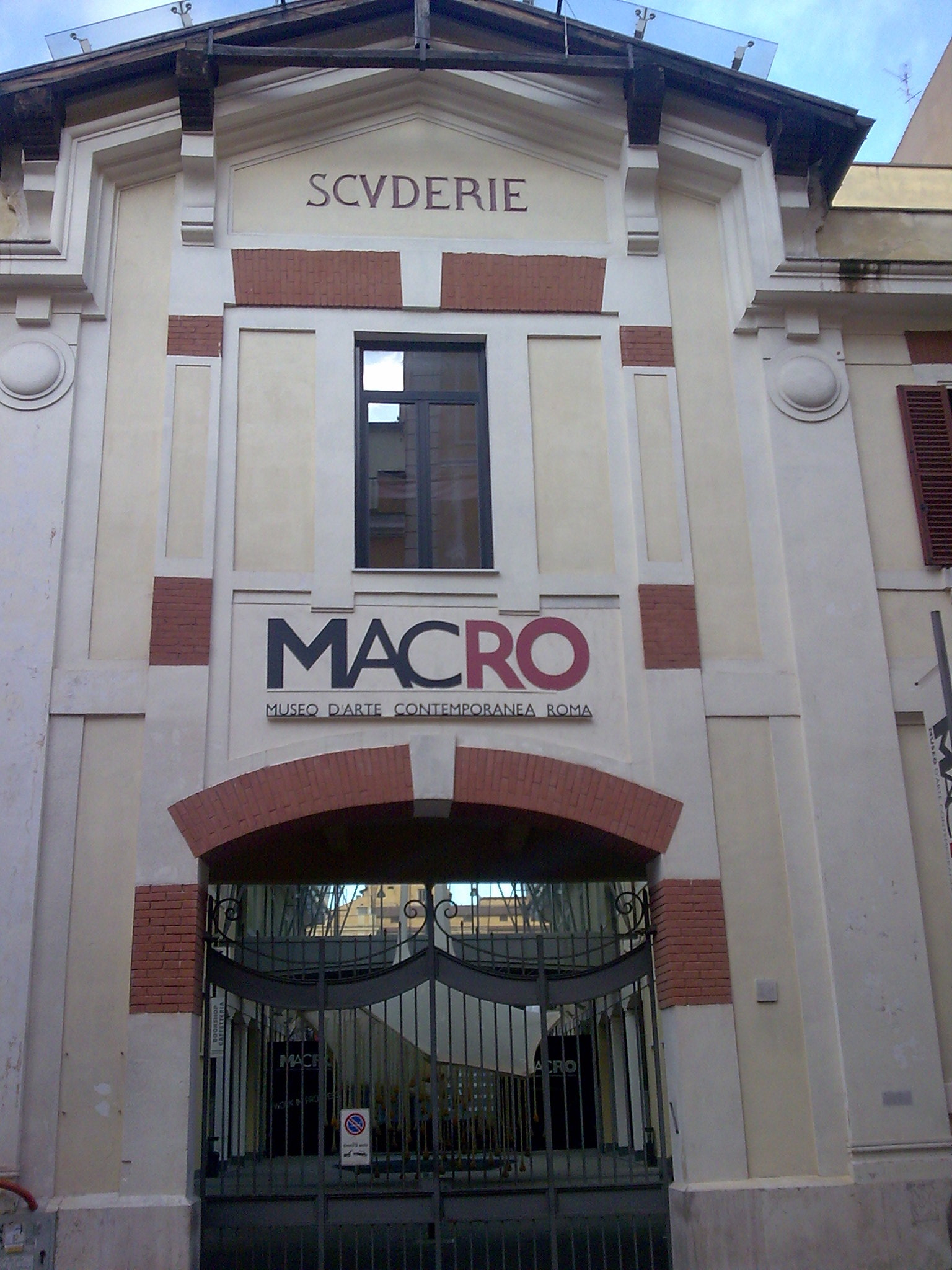
- The façade of the former brewery on via Reggio Emilia
- Click on the map for a fullscreen view
- Established: 1999; 27 years ago
- Location: Via Nizza 138, 00198 Rome, Italy
- Coordinates: 41°54′49″N 12°30′10″E
- Director: Cristiana Perrella – Artistic Director
- Architect: Gioacchino Ersoch (Testaccio building)
- Website: museomacro.org

The Museum of Contemporary Art of Rome (Italian: Museo d'Arte Contemporanea di Roma), usually known by the acronym MACRO, is a municipal contemporary art museum in Rome, Italy. The museum is housed in two separate places: a former brewery in Via Nizza, in the Salario quartiere (district) of the city; and a former slaughterhouse in Piazza Orazio Giustiniani, in the Testaccio district.

== History ==
The project began in the late 1990s in the site of the old Peroni Brewery. After an initial phase of restructuring, which allowed the opening of six rooms in September 1999, the museum was officially opened 11 October 2002.

Since 2003 the museum has also had an annex entitled MACRO Future, which comprises two refurbished buildings of 1,000 square metres each in the former slaughterhouse of Rome, several kilometers away in the Testaccio neighborhood.

=== Renovation ===
Since July 2004, an extension has been under construction in order to present all of the permanent collection. These arrangements have been entrusted to the French architect Odile Decq.

== Collection ==
MACRO's permanent collection includes a selection of some of the most significant expressions of the Italian art scene since the 1960s, such as the group Forma 1 with the works by Carla Accardi, Antonio Sanfilippo, Achille Perilli, Piero Dorazio, Leoncillo and Ettore Colla; the Arte Povera with Mario Ceroli and Pino Pascali; the Scuola di Piazza del Popolo with Tano Festa, Mario Schifano, Titina Maselli, and Mimmo Rotella.

The gallery collects works by such artists as Giovanni Albanese, Andrea Aquilanti, Gianni Asdrubali, Domenico Bianchi, Bruno Ceccobelli, Sarah Ciracì, Enzo Cucchi, Fabrice de Nola, Gianni Dessì, Gianfranco Baruchello, Daniele Galliano, Federico Guida, Felice Levini, Fabio Mauri, Luigi Ontani, Cristiano Pintaldi, Piero Pizzi Cannella, Gioacchino Pontrelli, Sissi, and Marco Tirelli.

Preceded by Museo Storico Nazionale dell'Arte Sanitaria	Landmarks of Rome; Museum of Contemporary Art of Rome	Succeeded by Museum of Roman Civilization
