= Fabio Viale =

Italian sculptor

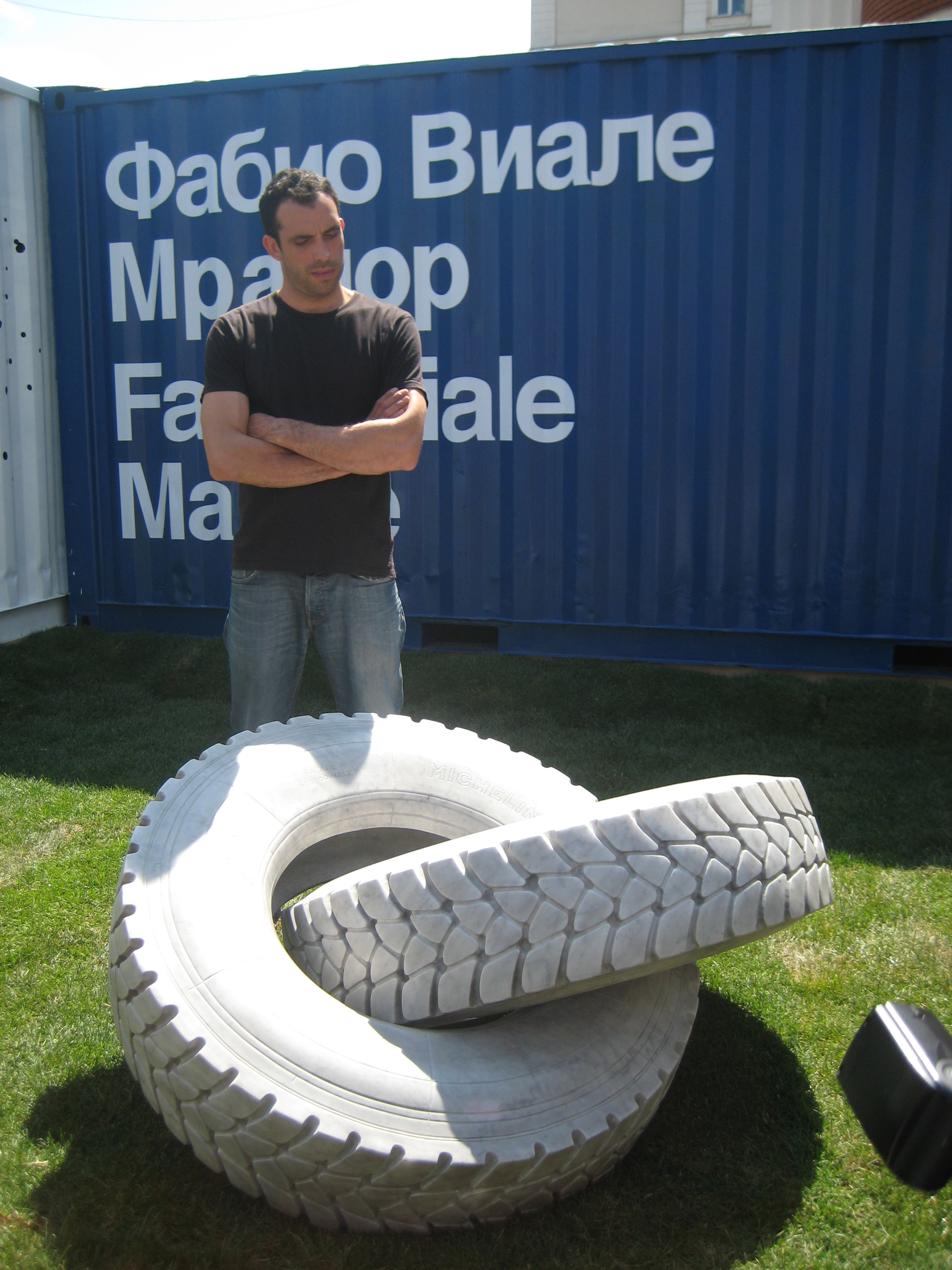
- Viale in 2011
- Born: September 19, 1975 (age 50); Cuneo, Italy
- Education: Accademia di Belle Arti in Turin
- Known for: Sculpture

Fabio Viale (Cuneo, September 19, 1975) is an Italian sculptor.

Viale's sculptures have been exhibited in Italy, Russia, Germany and the United States. Two of his sculptures were full-sized marble boats that were actually launched into water.

== Early life and work ==
After his studies at the artistic high school and at the Accademia Albertina in Turin, Italy, Viale started to work professionally as a sculptor.

== Career ==
In 2002 Viale presented Ahgalla, a marble boat able to float and to transport people using an outboard motor. It was launched in Carrara, Turin, Rome, Milan, Venice, Triest, Saint Petersburg, and Moscow. In 2009, Viale made a solo exhibition at the Loft Project Etagi of Saint Petersburg (Russia) that had more than 30,000 visitors. There, he launched Ahgalla 2, an improved version of Ahgalla, on the Neva River.

In 2010 Viale sculpted 'Cavour', a monument dedicated to Camillo Benso in Quirinale Palace (Rome, Italy). In 2011, Fabio exhibited his sculptures at an exhibition at the Garage Museum of Contemporary Art in Moscow, Russia. The next year, the 'Museo del Novecento' in Milan (Italy) exhibited his most representative artworks, and acquired a sculpture for its permanent collection. In 2012, the Henreaux Foundation in Querceta, Italy gave him an award.

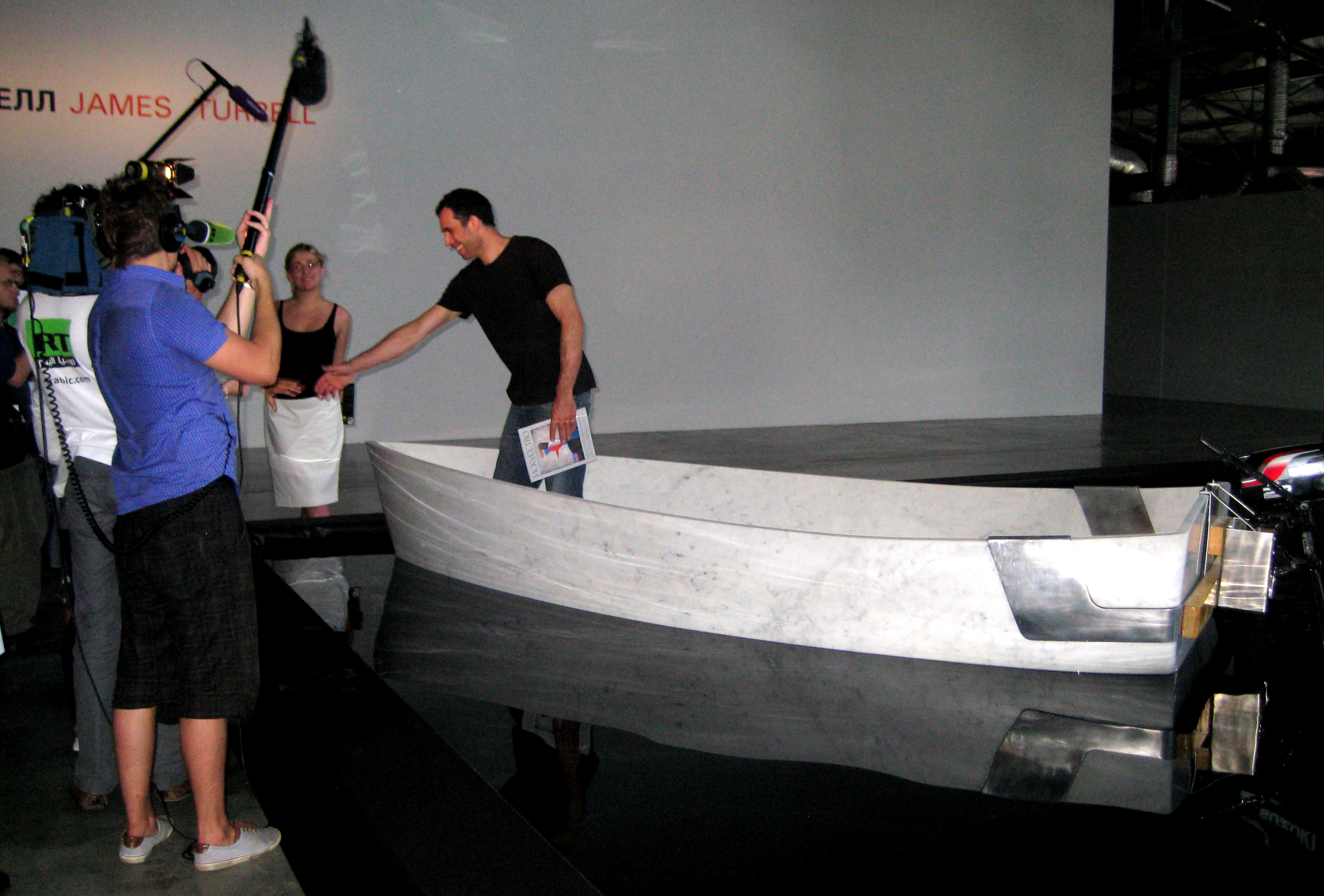

In 2013 Viale ran a solo exhibition at the Sperone Westwater Gallery in New York. In 2014 he won the 15th Cairo Prize, Italy. In 2017 Viale received 52nd international prize Le Muse at the Salone del Cinquecento at Palazzo Vecchio in Florence, Italy. In January 2018 he presented the exhibition Lucky Ehi- a version of 'La Pietà' by Michelangelo, but without the Christ in Milan (Italy) at 'Poggiali Gallery'. After a few months it was moved through Lampedusa's sea (Italy). In July of the same year he opened a solo exhibition at the Glyptothek in Munich (Germany) where he exhibited 11 sculptures, most of them large. Meanwhile, his monumental Laocoonte (white marble tattooed), was shown for the first time in Königsplatz in Munich. In 2019 he participated at the 58th edition of the Biennale in Venice, Italy.
