= Loris Cecchini =

Italian contemporary artist

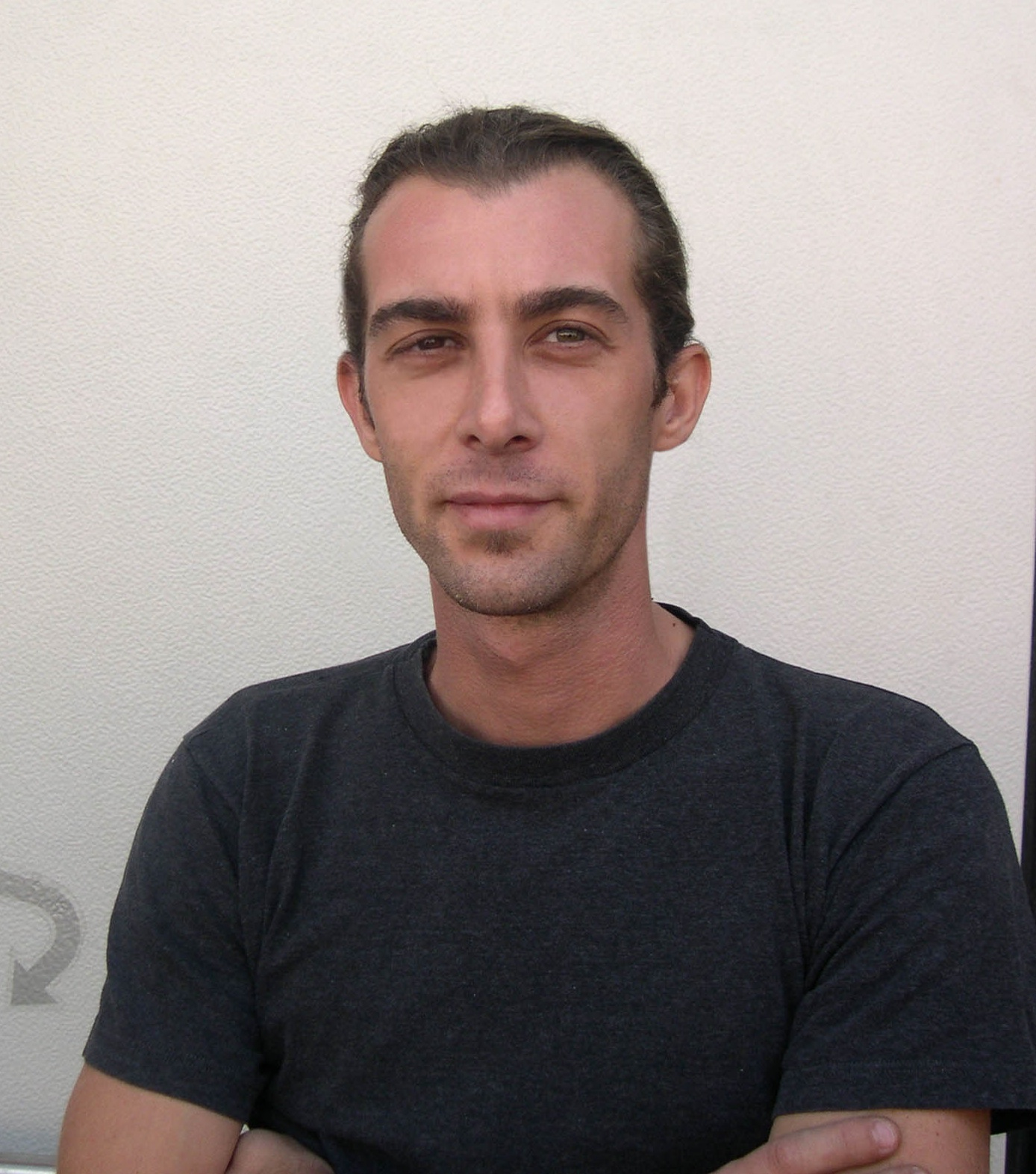
- Born: 7 May 1969 (age 57); Milan, Italy
- Known for: Contemporary art
- Movement: Sculpture, Installation
- Website: loriscecchini.org

Loris Cecchini (born 1969) is an Italian contemporary artist. He works in various media, among them sculpture, installation and photography. In 2014 he won the annual Premio Arnaldo Pomodoro per la Scultura awarded by the Fondazione Arnaldo Pomodoro.

Cecchini was born in Milan, in Lombardy in northern Italy, in 1969. He studied in Siena, in Florence and in Milan. His work was shown at the Museo Civico di Castel Nuovo in Naples in 2000, at MoMA PS1 in New York in 2006–2007, and at the Musée d'Art Moderne de Saint-Etienne Métropole in Saint-Étienne in France in 2010. As winner of the 2014 Premio Arnaldo Pomodoro per la Scultura, he had a solo show at the premises of the Fondazione in Milan in March of that year.

== Awards ==
- 2020 – ACACIA Prize, Italy.
- 2014 – Arnaldo Pomodoro Sculpture Prize, Milan, Italy.
- 2014 – ArtPrize, United States: shortlisted for a Juried Award.
- 2011 – Moroso Prize, Monfalcone, Italy.
- 2006 – Francesca Alinovi Prize, Bologna, Italy.
- 2005 – Agenore Fabbri Prize and VAF Foundation Award, Italy.
- 2005 – PARC Young Art Prize 2004–2005 (DARC, MAXXI and the Venice Biennale), Italy.
