= Nicola Verlato =

American painter (born 1965)

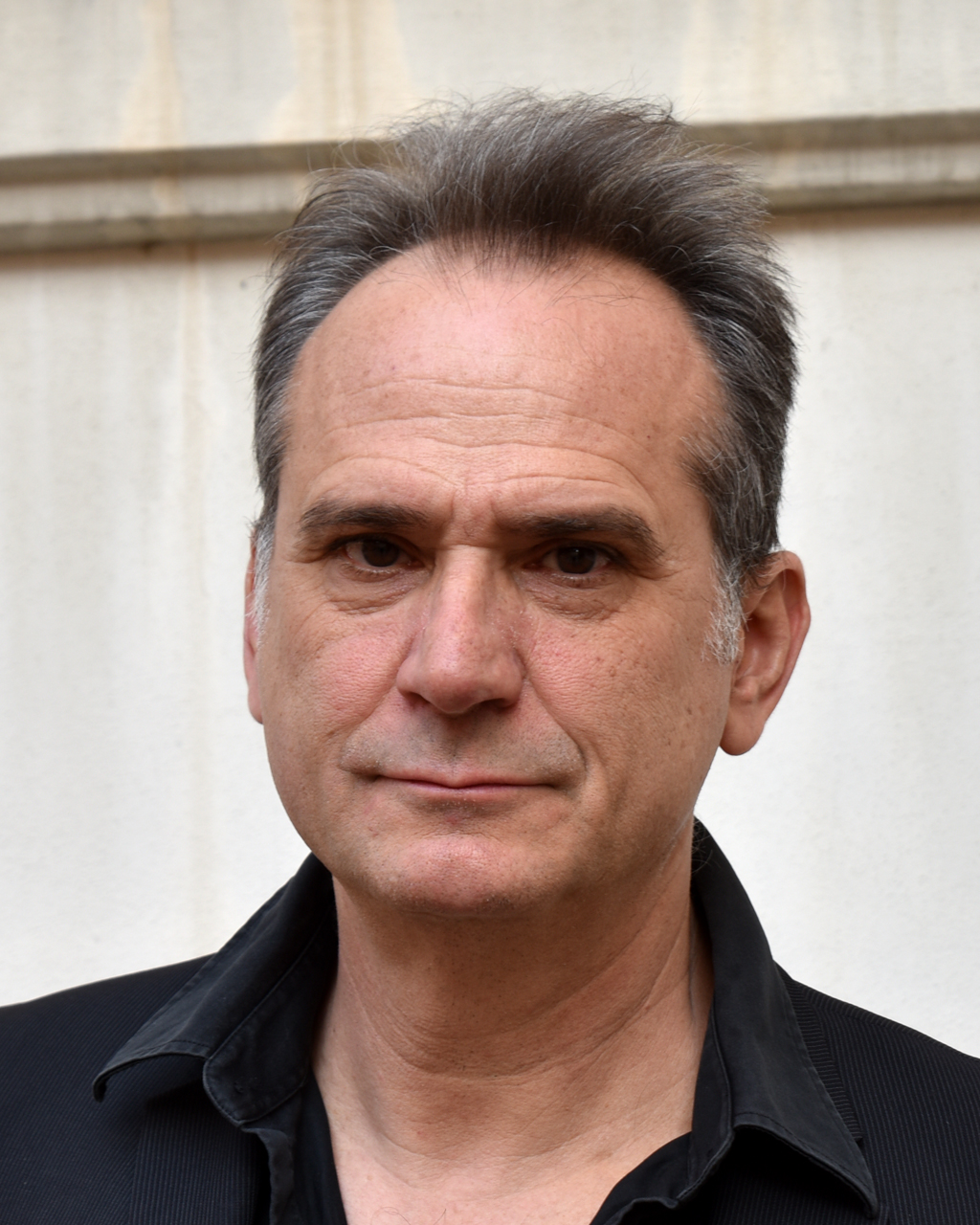
- Nicola Verlato (2026)
- Born: Nicola Verlato; February 19, 1965 (age 61); Verona, Italy
- Education: Monastery of Lonigo
- Known for: Painter
- Awards: Bevilacqua La Masa Foundation residency (1995)

Nicola Verlato (born February 19, 1965) is an Italian painter, sculptor, architect and musician based in Los Angeles, California.

== Early life and education ==
Nicola Verlato was born in Verona and began painting at a very early age, learning from Fra' Terenzio, a painter in the monastery of Franciscan friars of Lonigo. He was trained in Classical music and studied lute and composition at the conservatories of Verona and Padua. He studied architecture at University IUAV in Venice from 1984 to 1990, though he never completed his degree.

== Biography ==
=== Early career (1980–2004) ===
His first serious show was at the age of 15 in the town hall of Lonigo, a 3-person show in collaboration with another 2 artists from the same area. After moving to Venice, he began working for the local aristocracy and the affluent foreigners living in the city. During this period, besides painting, he also worked on almost everything that was connected with drawing: stage design, temporary decorations, illustrations, comics, storyboard etc. In 1995, he won an artist residency at Fondazione Bevilacqua La Masa. Around 28 years old, he started to be involved in contemporary art scene, and, consequentially, to show in numerous gallery in Italy and abroad in solo and group shows. In 1996, Verlato moved to Milan where he created his well grounded notoriety in Italy. In the same year, he exhibited his work at XII Quadriennale at Palazzo delle Esposizioni in Rome.

=== United States (2004–present) ===
In 2004, Verlato relocated from Milan to New York City. While living in New York, he was a professor teaching composition and painting courses at New York Academy of Art. He has shown his paintings, drawings, and sculptures in the United States and internationally, including the White Columns in New York, Museum of Modern Art in Arnhem, Prague Biennale, and an installation exhibited at the 2009 Venice Biennale in the Italian Pavilion.

Nicola Verlato creates his works through an articulated process that makes use of classical techniques as well as modern technology such as 3D Modeling programs such as Maya and ZBrush.

His work has been defined by Suzanne Hudson as,

"Nicola Verlato retains a kind of classicism that has traditionally implied conservatism, upholding a neorealist style evocative of Old Master painting, which he puts to use in near-apocalyptic, largely allegorical scenes of soldiers and bodies leaping from crashing vehicles. Verlato appropriates the campy, exaggerated violence common to the High Baroque and contemporary video games to comment on the clash of civilizations played out between polytheism and monotheism, and to underline its consequences for representation: cults of idols (figuration) versus prohibitions on graven images (abstraction). This is an important reminder of the different histories of form and the ideologies that underpin them, whose use depends on local context and other factors."

ー "Painting Now" by Suzanne Hudson, Thames & Hudson 2015, pg 128-129

Nicola Verlato has shown alongside artists such as Erwin Olaf, Santiago Sierra, Shepard Fairey, Kehinde Wiley, Ronald Ophuis, José Lerma, Mark Ryden, and Robert Williams.

His works are in the permanent collection at Jack Helgesen collection (Norway), M.A.R.T. Museum (Treno and Rovereto), MUSAC (Castilla and León), ENECO art collection (Netherlands), MUDIMA Foundation (Milan).

His work has been published in Art in America, Flash Art, Juxtapoz, Hi Fructose, Vogue Italia, Artpulse magazine, LoDown Magazine and more.

== Publications ==
- NICOLA VERLATO From Verona with Rage, Gingko Press, (2013).
- The Figure, New York Academy of Art,
