= Lara Favaretto =

Italian installation artist

- Born: 1973 (age 52–53); Treviso, Veneto, Italy
- Known for: Sculpture, installation, painting

Lara Favaretto (born 1973 in Treviso) is an Italian artist. Favaretto lives and works in Turin, Italy.

Favaretto is known for her paintings, installations and research based sculptural works. She has staged interventions that she calls "momentary monuments", drawing attention to the futility and impermanence of monuments and libraries .

== Exhibitions ==
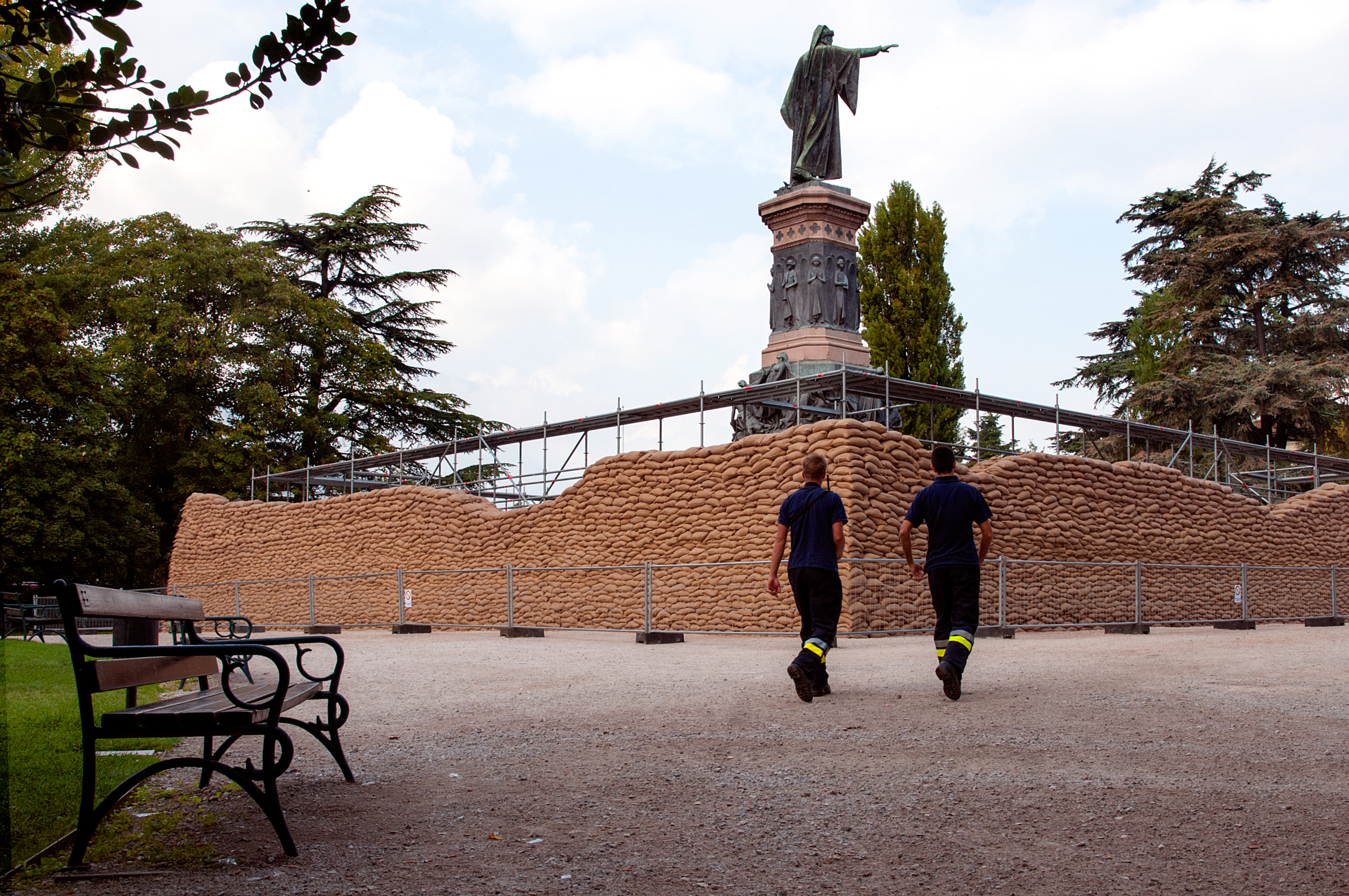
Momentary Monument (Wall), a public artwork by Lara Favaretto surrounding Trento, Italy's Monument to Dante statue.

Favaretto presented the installation work plotone in the Biennale of Sydney in 2008.

In 2009, with the support of the Galleria Civica foundation, she presented Momentary Monument (Wall), composed of a wall of 4000 sacs of sand around the Monument to Dante in Trento, Italy.

In 2012, MoMA PS1 presented a 15-year survey of her work titled Just knocked out. Favaretto participated in the 53rd Venice Biennale, the 58th Venice Biennale and the dOCUMENTA13 in the same year.

In 2017 she presented The Stone at Skulptur Projekte Münster The work, a large stone sculpture, included a slot for accepted donations for those facing deportation. During the course of the exhibition €26,600 was raised.

Her 2019 solo exhibition at the Bass Museum, Momentary Monument—The Library, was composed of 2000 books that were recovered from the Miami dump and altered by the artist. The same year, she presented Coppie simplici/Simple Couples, an outdoor installation of large used car-wash brushes at the Museum of Contemporary Art Santa Barbara.

== Awards ==
In 2011 she received the Querini Stampalia Prize for Young Italian Artists. In 2005 she was awarded the Venice Biennale Young Italian Art Prize., she won the 40th GNMH AWARD.

== Collections ==
Her work is in the collections of the Museo de Arte Contemporáneo de Castilla y León, the Metropolitan Art Society (MAS), the Museo nazionale delle arti del XXI secolo in Rome, Italy and the Collezione Maramotti.
