= Federico Solmi =

American artist

- Born: April 1973 (age 53); Bologna, Italy
- Known for: Digital art

Federico Solmi (born April 1973) is a visual artist based in Brooklyn, New York.

== About ==
Federico Solmi's work utilizes bright colors and a satirical aesthetic to portray a dystopian vision of our present-day society. His exhibitions often feature articulate installations composed of a variety of media including video, painting, drawing, and sculpture.

In 2009, Solmi was awarded by the Guggenheim Foundation of New York with the John Simon Guggenheim Memorial Fellowship in the category of Video & Audio. From 2016 to 2019, Solmi was a visiting professor at the Yale University School of Art and Yale School of Drama in New Haven, Connecticut.

== Exhibitions ==
Federico Solmi's work was included in the exhibition The Outwin 2019: American Portraiture Today, at the Smithsonian National Portrait Gallery, Washington DC. For the month of July 2019 his video installation “American Circus” was featured in Times Square New York for the Midnight moment series.

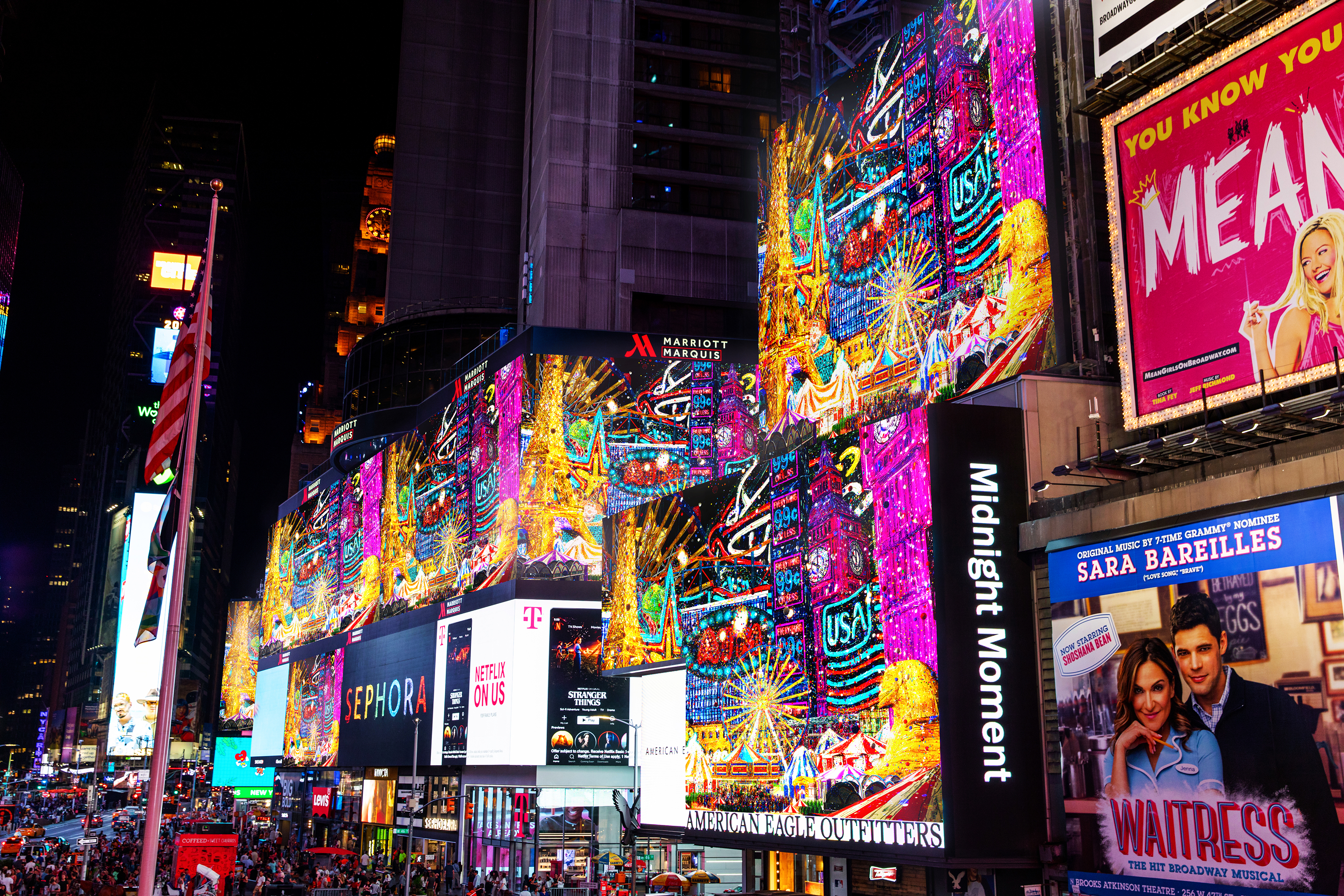
MIDNIGHT MOMENT. Time Square Arts, New York, NY, July 1 – 31

Solmi's works have been exhibited in several international biennials including: Open Spaces: A Kansas City Arts Experience (2018), the Beijing Media Art Biennale (2016), Frankfurt B3 Biennial of the Moving image (2017-2015), the First Shenzhen Animation Biennial in China (2013), the 54th Venice Biennial (2011), and the SITE Santa Fe Biennial in New Mexico (2010). Solmi' s work has been featured in solo museum exhibitions including Rowan University Art Gallery, Glassboro, New Jersey, Tarble Art Center, Charleston Illinois, Rochester Contemporary Art Center, Rochester, New York, Museo de Arte Contemporaneo del Zulia Maracaibo, Venezuela, the Haifa Museum of Art, Israel, the Centro Cultural Matucana 100, Santiago, Chile, The Italian Cultural institute of Madrid, Spain. Solmi' s videos have also been screened in festivals around the world, such as: Kassel Documentary Film and Video Festival, Tina B (Prague), Les Rencontres Internationales (Paris, Madrid, Berlin), The London International Animation Festival, Loop Barcelona, and more. He has given lectures on his work at universities and art schools in the United States and Europe.

== Collections ==
Solmi’s work is part of many notable collections including The Phillips Collection, Washington D.C.; Block Museum of Art at Northwestern University, Evanston, IL; Tarble Art Center, Charleston, IL; 21C Museum Hotels, Knoxville, TN; Thoma Foundation, Chicago, IL / Santa Fe, NM; OCAT, Oct Contemporary Art Terminal, Shanghai, China; Collezione Farnesina Experimenta, Rome, Italy; Dr. Arturo and Liza Mosquera Collection, Miami, FL; and Collezione Marchina, Milan, Italy.

== Awards ==
Guggenheim Foundation of New York with the John Simon Guggenheim Memorial Fellowship in the category of Video & Audio

Ben Award – Frankfurt B3 Biennal Of The Moving Image – Frankfurt Germany, 2015

== Articles ==
=== 2020 ===
- Darren Jones – Review of the exhibition “The Bacchanalian Ones”, Rowan University Art Gallery, Glassboro, New Jersey – Critics’ Picks, ARTFORUM
- Eleanor Heartney – Federico’s Solmi March of Folly – Essay for the Catalog of the exhibition “The Bacchanalian Ones”, Rowan University Art Gallery, Glassboro, New Jersey
- Mark Bloch – Review of the exhibition Art and Politics, Elga Wimmer Gallery, NY – Whitehot Magazine, December
- Salvatore Russo – The Great Satirical Orgy Art – Interview with Federico Solmi – Art International Magazine

=== 2019 ===
- Jamie Martinez – Interview with Artist Federico Solmi – ArteFuse, June
- Maximilíano Durón & Katherine McMahon – Scenes from the 2019 Armory Show – Artnews, March 6
- Zachary Small – Women and Minority Artists Flourish Amid Elite Indulgence at the 2019 Armory Show– Hyperallergic, March 7
- Andy Smith – The Video Paintings of Federico Solmi – Hifructose, March 17

== Publications ==
- ARTBOOK, 2010
- ARTFORUM, 2015
- artnet Review
- TTWISI, 2015
- Cleveland Johnson (ed.): Federico Solmi: Escape into the Metaverse (London: Black Dog Press, 2022). ISBN 978-1-912165-47-6
