= Stefano Arienti =

Italian artist

Stefano Arienti (born 1961) is an Italian artist whose art is inspired by the Arte Povera and Conceptual movements. He lives and works in Milan, Italy. He was born in Asola, Lombardy.

== Career ==
His work is made of found materials such as magazines, postcards, newspapers and books. Source materials are transformed through minimal actions such as folding or puncturing done repeatedly and systematically. He has exhibited extensively and in 2005, the Fondazione Sandretto Re Rebaudengo per l'Arte held a retrospective of his work. In 2008, Francesco Bonami curated the monumental exhibition "Italics: Italian Art between Tradition and Revolution, 1968-2008" at the Palazzo Grassi that included Arienti's Cassetto con strisce, 1987-1989. In 2009, the exhibition travelled to MCA Chicago. In 2007, Arienti was commissioned by Art Pace for their International Artist-In-Residence program. There he exhibited Library, a landscape of 400 bushels of wheat and 99 books that were buried within. In the Fall of 2010, Arienti showed his third solo exhibition, natura, natura, natura at greengrassi in London, UK.
