= Palazzo della Farnesina =

Italian government building in Rome

Coordinates: 41°56′13.96″N 12°27′28.46″E

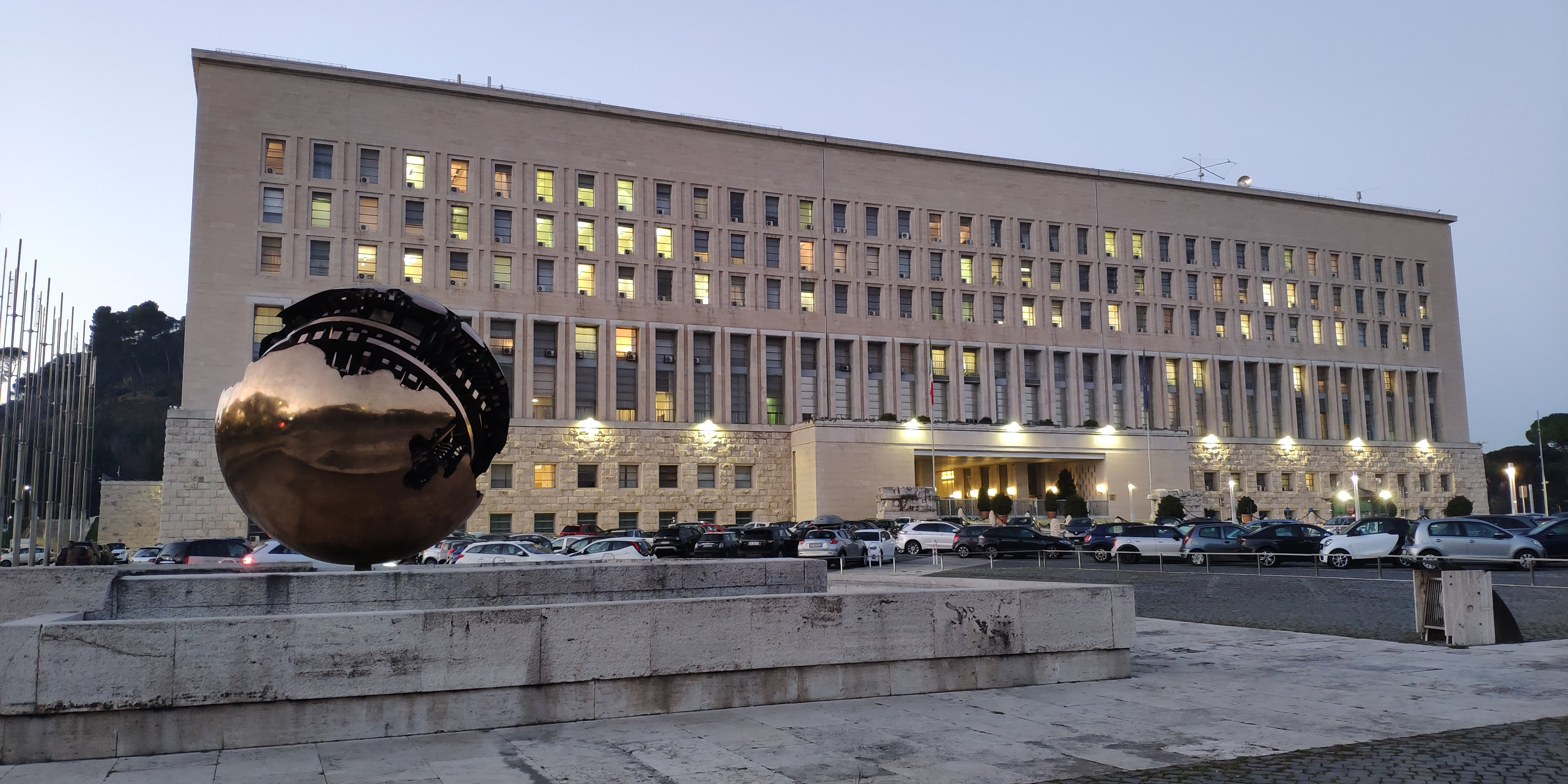
Palazzo della Farnesina

The Palazzo della Farnesina is an Italian government building located between Monte Mario and the Tiber River in the Foro Italico area in Rome, Italy. Designed in 1935, it has housed the Italian Ministry of Foreign Affairs since its completion in 1959. A reference to "La Farnesina" is often to be intended as a metonymy for the hosted institution, namely the Ministry itself.

== Structure ==
The nine-story building was designed in 1935 by architects Enrico Del Debbio, Arnaldo Foschini and Vittorio Ballio Morpurgo. It was originally designated to be the headquarters of Italy's National Fascist Party. Construction was halted in 1943 and throughout World War II.

The facade consists of travertine. Though this type of facade is commonly linked to the rationalist style of Giuseppe Terragni, it is, in this case, derived from contemporary fascist ideals.

The building consists of more than 1,300 rooms, is 169 meters in width, 51 meters tall, with a total area of 120,000 square meters and has a total internal volume of approximately 720,000 cubic meters. It is comparable in size to the Caserta Palace and is one of the largest buildings in Italy.

The Palazzo della Farnesina was completed in 1959, varying only slightly from its original design. Upon completion, it consolidated the 13 separate offices of the Italian Ministry of Foreign Affairs. Since completion of the building, the word "Farnesina" has been used synonymously to refer to the Italian Ministry of Foreign Affairs. Its name comes from the land on which it rises, the area between Monte Mario and the Tiber, which were called the Farnese Gardens (Orti della Farnesina) due to the ownership of Pope Paul III who was originally named Alessandro Farnese.

The building should not be confused with the 16th-century Villa Farnesina, also often called simply "the Farnesina," in Via della Lungara.

== Art collection ==
In 1999 the Directorate General for Promotion and Cultural Cooperation of the Ministry of Foreign Affairs launched an initiative to allow public access to the collections of the Palazzo della Farnesina. This was done by opening galleries and collections to the public via a series of exhibitions with a focus on 20th century Italian art. The Farnesina Collection trace the history of twentieth-century Italian art through Art Nouveau, Futurism, abstract art, Arte Povera, Transavantgarde, and the New Roman School.

In 2008, the collection of Italian art of the Farnesina was augmented by a new collection consisting of the works of the most recent generations of Italian artists. The new Farnesina Experimenta Collection was inaugurated on 5 July 2008 at the time of Open Doors at the Farnesina.

On March 13, 2009, at Villa Madama in Rome, the Foreign Minister, Franco Frattini, Minister for Culture, Sandro Bondi, and the Minister of Economic Development, Claudio Scajola announced a third collection entitled the Farnesina Design Collection.

== See also ==
- Ministry of Foreign Affairs (Italy)
- Enrico Del Debbio
- Farnesina Experimenta Art Collection

== Sources ==
- Ciucci, Giorgio (2002). Gli architetti e il fascismo. Architettura e città 1922-1944. Turin: Einaudi. ISBN 88-06-16310-8.
