= Giuseppe Stampone =

Italian artist

Giuseppe Stampone (born in Cluses, France) is a visual artist who lives and works between Rome and Brussels. His artistic production ranges from multimedia installations and videos to drawings made with Bic pen, a technique common to several of his projects. The work of Stampone is that of an artist-activist in an age of so-called crisis. In a time of rising public vigilance, his art is unabashedly a potent form of political protest. He is the founder with his wife Maria Crispal of Global Education and Solstizio Project, in collaboration with the European Union and developed in different Countries of the world. Stampone collaborates with various universities as the Academy of Fine Arts of Bologna where he teaches "Tecniche e Tecnologie delle Arti Visive", IULM of Milan, the Federico II University of Naples and the McLuhan Program in Culture and Technology of Toronto. He elaborates interventions of research and experimentation about art and new media with Alberto Abruzzese and Derrick De Kerckhove.

== Work ==
Stampone continuously seeks to introduce an alternative socio-political agenda through his art works and community-based interventions. His approach is nuanced and methodical, inviting audiences to meditate on basic issues such as immigration, water and war, even as they find themselves having to endure those natural and man-made disasters and conflicts that seem to abound today.

In 2008 he founded the special project Solstizio, a multilayered platform that operates between didactics, art, eco-social issues and new-media, in collaboration with public and private authorities, Universities, Museums and Foundations. His art has become global and does not end in a defined project; it takes more the form of a social network, from which different ways of observation and action develop in adjacent realities in the world.

== Career ==
Stampone's work has been exhibited widely throughout Italy and abroad, in international Art Biennial and Museums including the 56th and 59th Venice Biennial (2015 - 2022); Kochi-Muziris Biennial (2012); 11th Havana Biennial (2012); Liverpool Biennial (2010); Venice Architecture Biennial (2022); Ostenda Triennial (2017); Chengdu Biennial (2026); 14th and 15th Quadriennale of Rome (2004–2008); Pistoletto Foundation - Hotel Città dell'Arte curated by Ilaria Bernardi; Kunsthalle City Museum in Gwangiu (2010); American Academy in Rome (2008 – 2013 – 2014 – 2015); MIT Museum Boston (2015); Wifredo Lam Contemporary Art Center, La Havana (2012); MAMBO Museum, Bogotà; Cabaret Voltaire, Zürich (2011); The Invisible Dog Art Center, Brooklyn-New York; MAXXI - National Museum of the 21st Century Arts – in Rome (2014); Palazzo Reale in Milan (2014); Gamec Museum in Bergamo (2010 – 2011 – 2014); “Global Education” a cura di Giacinto di Pietrantonio solo show, Prometeogallery di Ida Pisani, Milano-Lucca (2012); Macro Museum in Rome (2010–2011); "Giuseppe Stampone – The Rules of the Game", solo show, Prometeogallery di Ida Pisani, Milano-Lucca (2010);Palazzo Reale, Naples (2004); La Triennale Bovisa in Milan (2008–2009). In 2013 was affiliated Fellowship at The American Academy in Rome and winner of the Art Residency at Young Eun Museum of Contemporary Art (YMCA), Gwangju, Korea. He won the 3° Maretti Prize (Centro per l'arte contemporanea Luigi Pecci, Prato) and the first edition of Pacco d'Artista Prize promoted by Poste Italiane. He is present at the 2017 Seoul Biennale of Architecture and Urbanism with a new Architecture of Intelligence based on the relationship between urban spaces and their surrounding ecosystems. In the same year the Civitella Ranieri Foundation visual arts jury selected Stampone for their fellowship.

== Collections ==
Among the foundations and public collections holding work by Stampone are: Phelan Foundation, New York; La Gaia Foundation, Busca (Cuneo); Biennal Kochi-Muziris Foundation; Birbragher Foundation, Bogota; Museum MAMBO of Bogota; Museum of Huston; Sidney Biennial Foundation, Sidney; La Quadriennale Foundation, Rome; Museum MAXXI in Rome; LAM, Museum of Contemporary Art, La Havana; Gamec Museum, Bergamo; Istituto Nazionale per la Grafica, Rome; La Farnesina Collection, Rome. His works have been collected by, among others, Byblos, BIC, Luciano Benetton, Amy Phelan.

== Personal life ==
In August 2008 Stampone married Maria Crispal (Maria Cristina Palombieri). The couple have lived in Rome, Milan, Brussels and New York City, now they live in Abruzzo (Italy). They are the founders of the Project Global Education since 2004.

== Monographs ==
- The unexpected guest, Pistoletto Foundation, 2026
- Fotocopiatrice intelligente, The Drawing Hall edition, 2025
- Game Over, Malvina Menegaz Foundation, 2024
- La natura delle cose, Ybrand Edition, 2023 (Winner Project PAC)
- Connective personal, Museum of Lissone, 2022
- Perché il cielo è di tutti e la Terra no?, Museum CIAC, Foligno, 2018
- Portraits Bic Data Blue, Maretti Editore, Cesena 2014
- Odio gli Indifferenti, Nero, Roma 2014
- Global Education – from Solstizio to We are the Planet, Damiani, Bologna 2012
- Alfa/Omega, Maretti Editore, Cesena 2012
- Saluti da L'Aquila, Maretti Editore, Cesena 2011
- Neodimensional Aesthetics, MMMAC, Salerno 2011
- Global Education, Parallelo42, Pescara 2011
- Private Collections, Museum L'ARCA Editions, Teramo 2011
- Maestro Giuseppe Stampone's 18 inventions + 1 that will change the world, Sara Zanin Gallery, Roma 2008
- Giuseppe Stampone, De Luca Editori d'Arte, Roma 2006
