= Palazzo delle Esposizioni =

Museum in Italy

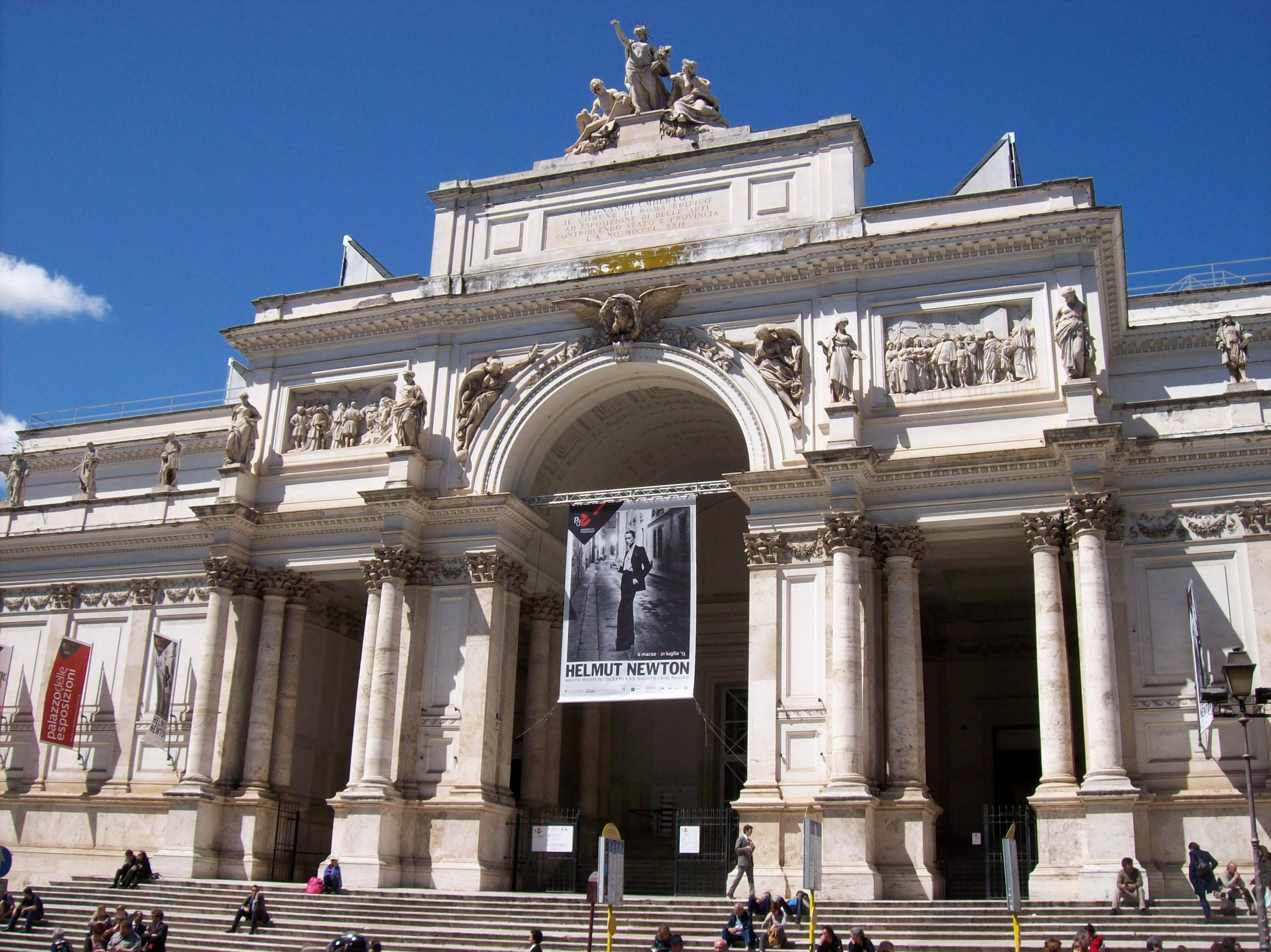
- Façade of the building
- Click on the map for a fullscreen view
- Established: 1883
- Location: Via Nazionale, 194; 00184 Rome, Italy
- Coordinates: 41°53′58″N 12°29′24″E
- Website: www.palazzoesposizioni.it

The Palazzo delle Esposizioni is a neoclassical exhibition hall, cultural center and museum on Via Nazionale in Rome, Italy.

== History ==
Designed by Pio Piacentini, it opened in 1883. It has housed several exhibitions (e.g. Mostra della Rivoluzione Fascista, Mostra Augustea della Romanità), but was temporarily modified during the Fascist era due to its style being thought to be out of step with the times.

The building is owned by the City of Rome and the gallery is administered by Azienda Speciale Palaexpo, an agency run by the City's Office for Education and Culture.

== Cinema ==
It incorporates a 139-seat cinema, a 90-seat auditorium, a café, a large, 240-place restaurant, a library and a multi-functional room known as the Forum.

== Main exhibitions ==
- Esposizione delle Belle Arti del 1883.
- Exhibition on Garibaldi (1932)
- Mostra della Rivoluzione Fascista (1932–1934)
- Mostra Augustea della Romanità (1937)
- Il socialismo è una malattia, Exhibition of the Competition of the Italian Federation of Artists and Professionals, FISAP - celebrating the Hungarian uprising against Communist Soviet Union (May, 1957)
- Quadriennale di Roma (1st - 4th, 6th - 10th, 12th, 13th and 15th)

== Notes and references ==
Preceded by National Museum of Oriental Art	Landmarks of Rome; Palazzo delle Esposizioni	Succeeded by Pigorini National Museum of Prehistory and Ethnography
