= International Studio & Curatorial Program =

Art institution in Brooklyn, New York

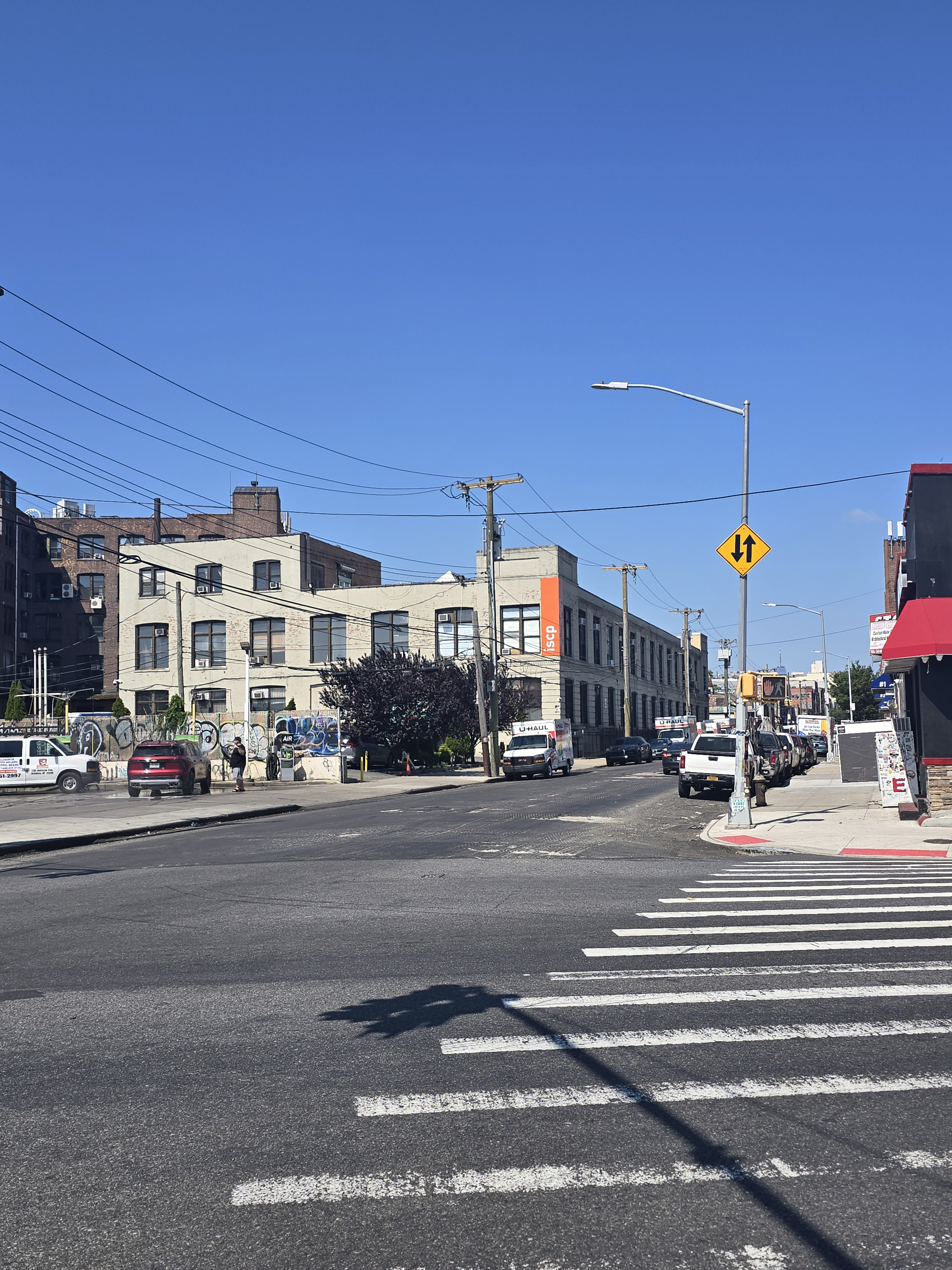
The International Studio & Curatorial Program building in Brooklyn

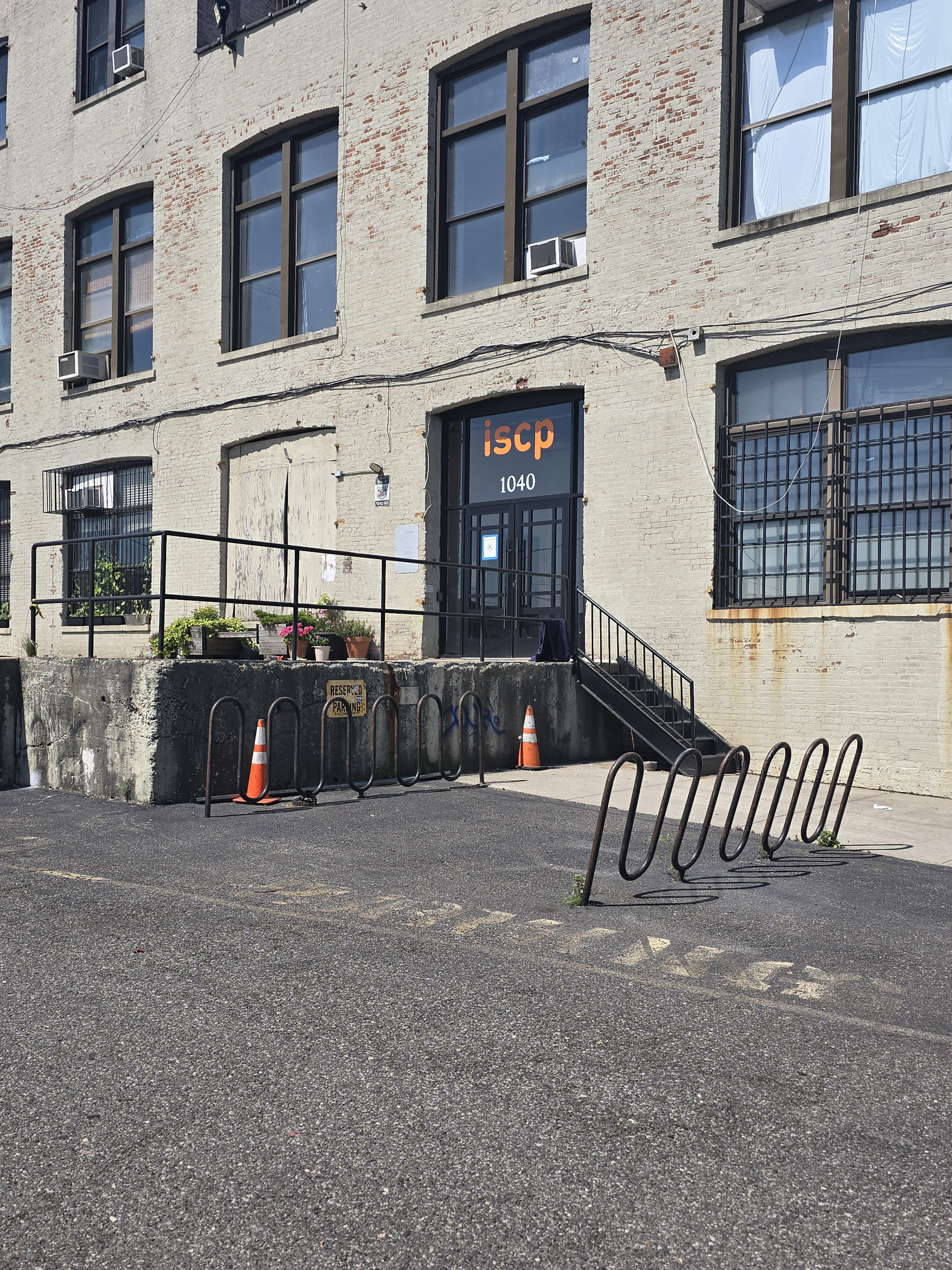
The entrance to ISCP

International Studio & Curatorial Program (ISCP) is a contemporary art institution that runs an international residency program and related exhibitions and events based in Brooklyn, New York. ISCP's exhibitions, talks, screenings and lectures generally focus on introducing New York audiences to work produced by international artists. The residency program has hosted more than 1,800 artists and curators from 90 countries, including the United States.

The International Studio Program (ISP) was founded in 1994 in Tribeca, Lower Manhattan. The governments of Sweden, Denmark, France, Spain, Portugal, Finland, Poland, and the Asian Cultural Council joined the initiative shortly thereafter. In 1999, the organization added curatorial residencies, and became the International Studio & Curatorial Program (ISCP) with the Trust for Mutual Understanding sponsoring a curator from Czech Republic. In 2001, ISCP relocated to Hell's Kitchen, Manhattan and in 2008, ISCP moved to East Williamsburg, Brooklyn and increased its capacity to 35 studios. ISCP's programs are currently housed in a former factory built in 1901, which was the world's first air-conditioned building.

== Notable alumni ==
- Saâdane Afif
- Maess Anand
- Aideen Barry
- Benandsebastian
- Pierre Bismuth
- Stefano Cagol
- Firoz Mahmud
- Amy Cheung (Hong Kong artist)
- Zoe Crosher
- Mai Abu ElDahab
- Petra Feriancová
- Theaster Gates
- Christian Falsnaes
- Chiara Fumai
- Frances Goodman
- Camille Henrot
- Natasha Johns-Messenger
- Michael Jones McKean
- Jesper Just
- Gabriel Lester
- Aris Kalaizis
- Joachim Koester
- John Korner
- Kasper Kovitz
- Agnieszka Kurant
- Renzo Martens
- Joiri Minaya
- Bjørn Melhus
- Kate Newby
- Orlan
- Pak Sheung Chuen
- Max Pam
- Patricia Piccinini
- Edward Poitras
- Nicolas Provost
- Ernesto Ríos
- Valerio Rocco Orlando
- Julika Rudelius
- Børre Sæthre
- Marinella Senatore
- Jeremy Shaw
- Eva Koťátková
- Necmi Sönmez
- Miha Štrukelj
- Guido van der Werve
- Rob Voerman
- Marjorie Welish
- Naomi Andrée Campbell
- Hikaru Fujii
- Ester Partegàs
- Chi Wo Leung
