= Videoart at Midnight =

Fostering contemporary art

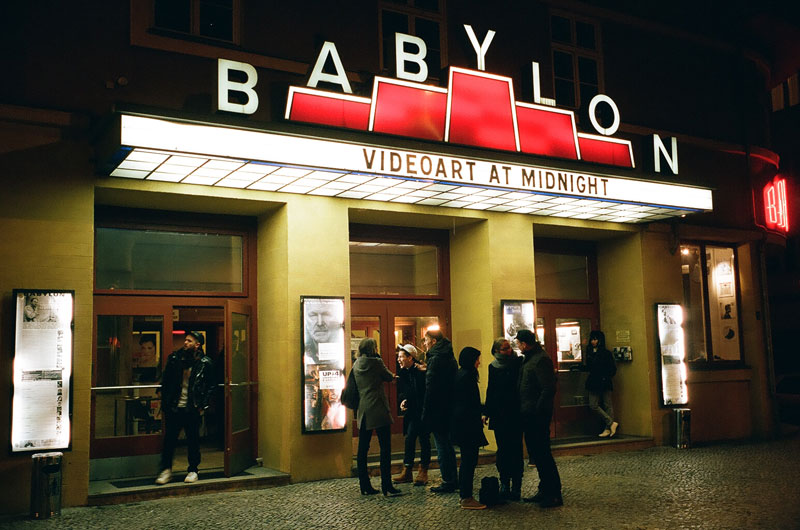
Videoart at Midnight at Kino Babylon

Videoart at Midnight is an international forum fostering contemporary art, in particular film, new media art and video art. In a monthly program, international artists are invited to show their work in the big cinema hall of the Kino Babylon in the Mitte neighborhood of Berlin, Germany.

== Background ==
Videoart at Midnight is a private initiative, founded in 2008 by Olaf Stüber and Ivo Wessel. Monthly since, always on a Friday at midnight, Stüber invites artists to show their works in the "Dispositif cinema" to put them up for discourse. Every night is dedicated to one artist; the artist is present. It is often the occasion for a premiere of a video work, sometimes accompanied by live acts such as performances, concerts, lectures or artist talks.

The aim of the screening series is to offer a forum for Berlin's international art scene and to give an insight into an artist media that is gaining an increasing importance within the contemporary art production.

Videoart at Midnight is a non-profit cultural program.

== Program ==
- 2023: Liam Gillick and Gelitin, Christa Joo Hyun D'Angelo, Bani Abidi, Clément Cogitore, Bianca Kennedy, Adrian Paci, Laure Prouvost, Mikhail Karikis, Annika Kahrs.
- 2022: Popo Fan, Cyrill Lachauer, Anna Ehrenstein, Rosa Barba, Marianna Simnett, Mathieu Kleyebe Abonnenc, Vajiko Chachkhiani, Wong Ping, C-98.
- 2021: Peter Miller, Ahmet Öğüt, Haris Epaminonda.
- 2020: Willem de Rooij, Eli Cortiñas, Brody Condon, Gernot Wieland.
- 2019: Li Zhenhua, Ari Benjamin Meyers, Ina Wudtke, Monira Al Qadiri, Lucy Beech, Jan-Peter E.R. Sonntag, Korpys/Löffler, Bigert & Bergström, Sandra Schäfer, Julian Rosefeldt.
- 2018: Wolfgang Tillmans, Klaus vom Bruch, Maya Schweizer, Pauline Curnier Jardin.
- 2017: Pola Sieverding, Tobias Zielony, Mario Rizzi, Yuri Ancarani, Andy Graydon, Agnieszka Polska, Theo Eshetu, Simon Faithfull, Michel Auder, Hiwa K.
- 2016: Assaf Gruber, Katarina Zdjelar, Christoph Girardet & Matthias Müller, Eva Meyer & Eran Schaerf, Lynne Marsh, Joep van Liefland, Dafna Maimon, Jeremy Shaw, Shahram Entekhabi, Christian Falsnaes.
- 2015: John Bock, Stefan Zeyen, Amie Siegel, Shingo Yoshida, Filipa César, Erik Bünger, Dani Gal, Ulu Braun, Chto Delat?, Yael Bartana.
- 2014: Safy Sniper, Isabell Heimerdinger, Vibeke Tandberg, Sven Johne, Julieta Aranda, Guido van der Werve, Anri Sala, Marcel Odenbach, Phil Collins, Alice Creischer & Andreas Siekmann.
- 2013: Hito Steyerl, Reynold Reynolds, Candice Breitz, Köken Ergun, Martin Brand, Nina Fischer & Maroan el Sani, Annika Eriksson, Martin Skauen, Douglas Gordon, Harun Farocki.
- 2012: Rebecca Ann Tess, Bettina Nürnberg & Dirk Peuker, Armin Linke, Clemens von Wedemeyer, Keren Cytter, Christian Jankowski, Melanie Manchot, Manuel Graf, Ming Wong, Omer Fast, Niklas Goldbach.
- 2011: Matthias Baader Holst, Erik Schmidt, Delia Gonzalez and Black Leotard Front, Anja Kirschner & David Panos, Chicks on Speed, Knut Klassen, Bjørn Melhus, Mathilde Rosier, Benjamin Heisenberg, Bewegung Nurr.
- 2010: Oliver Pietsch, Antje Majewski, Chris Newman & Miss Moth, Marion Pfeifer, Marc Aschenbrenner and Knut Klaßen, Christoph Draeger, Ant Farm, BitteBitteJaJa, Mathilde ter Heijne.
- 2009: Ulf Aminde, Reynold Reynolds, gelitin and friends, Ulrich Polster, Eléonore de Montesquiou, Stefan Panhans, Knut Klassen, Marc Aschenbrenner
- 2008: Annika Larsson & Samuel Nyholm, Sven Johne, Bjørn Melhus.

== Literature ==
- Olaf Stüber, Anton Stüber: "The Videoart at Midnight Artists' Cookbook", KERBER Publishing 2020, ISBN 978-3-7356-0725-6
- Sven Hausherr, Nina Trippel: "CEE CEE BERLIN. Berlin Highlights", DISTANZ Verlag, Berlin 2014, ISBN 978-3-95476-069-5
- Ekaterina Rietz-Rakul, Steve Schepens: Berlin Contemporary Art. Editor: Alexander Grebennikov. Berlin 2011, ISBN 978-3-941784-07-9.
- Julia Brodauf, Lena Hartmann, Ulrich J. C. Harz, Alexandra Wendorf, Stefanie Zobel: "OFF SPACES & SITES: Unusual Exhibition Spaces Beyond the Established Art Market", GKS-Fachverlag für den Kunstmarkt, Bad Honnef 2013, ISBN 978-3-9808298-0-9
