= Sæthre =

Sæthre is a surname. Notable people with the surname include:

- Børre Sæthre (born 1967), Norwegian artist
- Ingrid Camilla Fosse Sæthre (born 1978), Norwegian football player
- Ståle Steen Sæthre (born 1993), Norwegian football player and coach
- Torunn Fossli Sæthre (born 1970), Norwegian orienteering competitor
