= Julika Rudelius =

German-born artist

Julika Rudelius (born 1968 in Cologne, Germany) is a video and performance artist who lives and works in Amsterdam, Netherlands. Rudelius' photographic and video work examines complex notions of emotional dependency, social power, abuse, identity, and cultural hegemony.

== Biography ==
Rudelius studied visual communication at the Hochschule für Bildende Künste Hamburg, as well as photography in Cologne and Amsterdam. She graduated from the Gerrit Rietveld Academy in 1988. She is also a fellow of the Rijksakademie van beeldenden kunsten (1999-2000) and of the International Studio & Curatorial Program (ISCP) in New York in 2006.

== Exhibitions and collections ==
Julika Rudelius has exhibited in numerous museums including Tate Modern; the ZKM; Van Abbe Museum; Stedelijk Museum; SCHIRN; the Frankfurter Kunstverein; Centre Culturel Suisse; Reinhard Hauff Galerie; Galerie Manuela Klercks; The John Institute; Bard Museum at Bard College; Aeroplastics Contemporary; Frans Hals Museum; Figge von Rosen Gallery, and New York's Swiss Institute.

=== Exhibitions (selection) ===
- The Seamless Real at Rozenstraat, a rose is a rose is a rose, Amsterdam (16.05–15.08.2026)
- The Emperor’s new Mall at Weserburg Museum für moderne Kunst, Bremen (06.09.2025–10.05.2026)
- in the days of the bullies at Villa Merkel, Esslingen (13.05.–16.07.2023)
- Love is Colder than Capital [group exhibition] at the Kunsthaus Bregenz (02.02.–14.04.2013)
- What is on the Otherside at the Museum of Arts and Design, New York, 2013
- Rituals of Capitalism at Leo Koenig Inc., New York City (11.07.– 08.09.2012)
- Forever at the Swiss Institute of Contemporary Art, New York City (22.05.– 14.07.2007)

=== Collections (selection) ===
- MUDAM
- Stedelijk Museum Amsterdam
- Centre Pompidou
- Art Collection Deutsche Börse
- Frans Hals Museum
- Van Abbemuseum
