= Amy Cheung =

Amy Cheung may refer to:

- Amy Cheung (writer), Hong Kong writer
- Amy Cheung (artist), Hong Kong artist
