= Ernesto Ríos =

Mexican visual artist (born 1975)

Ernesto Ríos (born October 8, 1975) is a Mexican new media artist and academic based in Mexico City.

== Career ==
Born in Cuernavaca, Ríos is a visual artist who showcases drawing, painting, video, photography, animation, virtual reality, performance, interactive art and net.art.

Ríos has shown his work at galleries and museums in Mexico and other countries, such as at Museo de Arte Carrillo Gil in Mexico City, Fototeca de Cuba in Havana, Cuba, and the Institute of Contemporary Arts in London. His artwork has been presented through channels such as the Java Museum Forum for Internet Technology in Contemporary Art, and exhibited in international shows such as NetSpace: Viaggio nell'arte at the National Museum of the 21st Century Arts.

In 1999, Ríos participated in the "National Presence of Creators" gallery of the Instituto Politécnico Nacional. In 2003 and 2004, he showcased at the IV and VI International Salon of Digital Art in Havana Cuba. In 2008, Ríos participated in the New Media Festival, Digital Media at the "Centre Cultural Valencia" in Valencia, Spain.

== Education ==
Ríos joined the International Studio & Curatorial Program in 2003. He studied language and Hispanic literature and linguistics in CIDHEM in 2004. He earned a MPS from the Interactive Telecommunications Program of the Tisch School of the Arts at New York University where he studied with R. Luke DuBois.

Ríos holds a Doctorate of Philosophy (PhD) from RMIT (Royal Melbourne Institute of Technology)

== Works ==
- DF Maze (2006)
- Sand-Clock (2006)
- Labrys-Syrbal (2006)

== Selected exhibitions ==
- 2000 Disolvencias / Mirrors of the Memory, Center of the Image, Mexico City. Mexico.
- 2003 Ernesto Ríos, International Studio & Curatorial Program, New York
- 2004 Ernesto Ríos, Fototeca de Cuba, Havana Cuba
- 2004 Ernesto Ríos. Gallery Art Resources Transfer, New York
- 2017 Sismo Gallery, Constelaciones, Mexico City, Mexico.
- 2017 Code_of_the_forest, Centro Roberto Garza Sada, UDEM, N.L. Monterrey, Mexico.
