= Stefano Cagol =

Italian artist (born 1969)

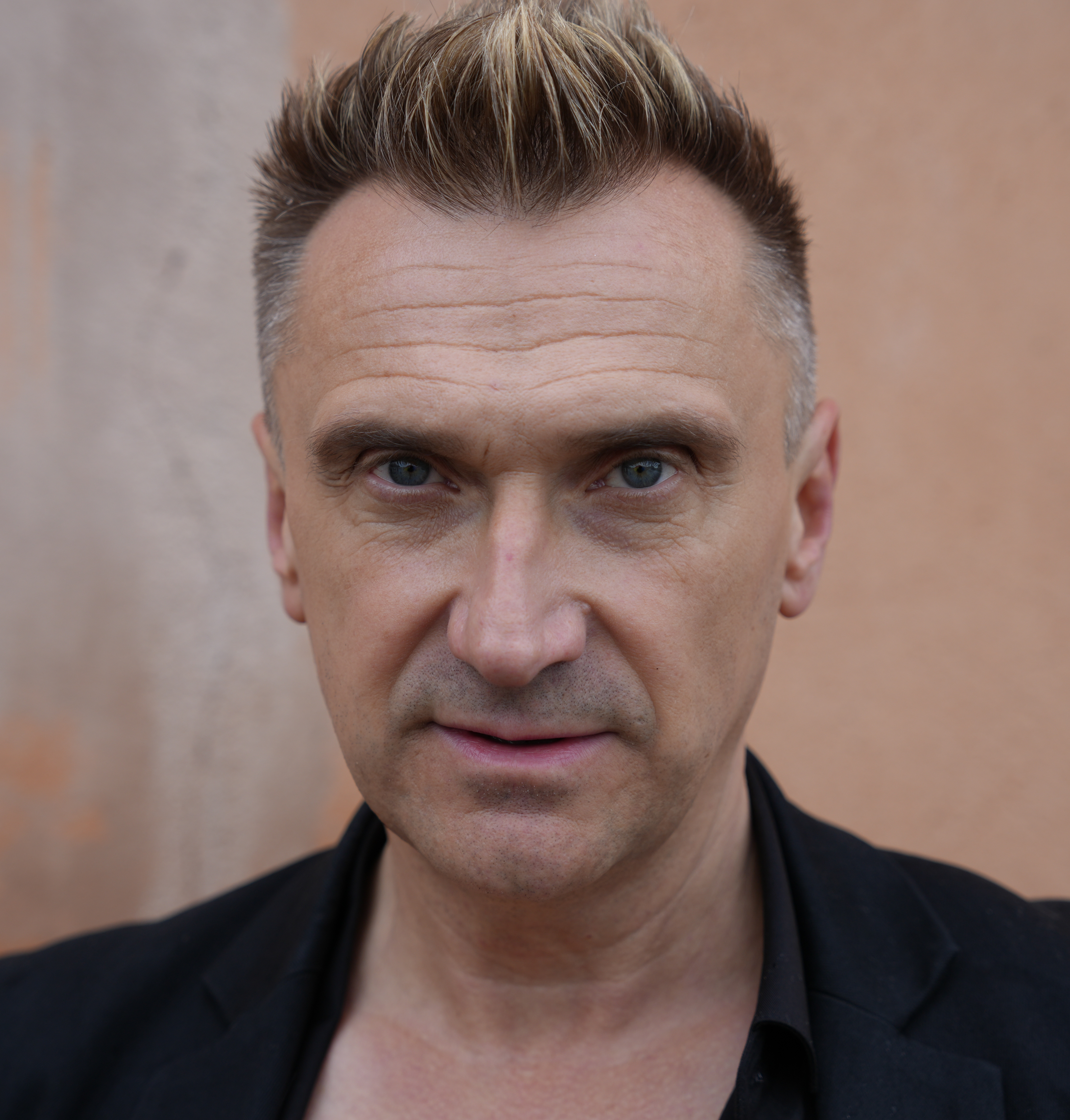
- Stefano Cagol in 2026 at Venice Biennale
- Born: September 11, 1969 (age 57); Trento, Italy
- Occupation: Italian artist

Stefano Cagol (born September 11, 1969 in Trento) is an Italian contemporary artist living in Italy, Germany and Norway. His artistic practice spans video, photography, installation and performance art in the fields of conceptual art, environmental art / eco art and land art, and has reflected for years on borders, viruses, flags and climate issues. His research includes both artistic and curatorial work, often engaging with political ecology and the Anthropocene. He has exhibited internationally and curated interdisciplinary projects at the intersection of art and science.

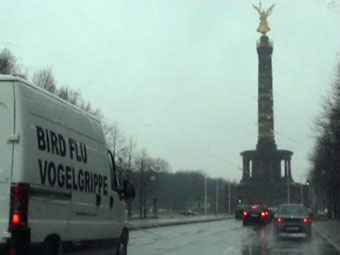
Stefano Cagol, BIRD FLU / VOGELGRIPPE, Special off Project at Berlin Biennale

== Life ==
Cagol was born in Trento. He studied at the Institute of Art in Trento, the Academy of Fine Arts in Brera, Milan and at the Ryerson Polytechnical Institute in Toronto, where he was a post-doctoral fellow. He also attended the Internationale Sommerakademie für Bildende Kunst in Salzburg and the ICP-International Center of Photography in New York. He was artist in residence at the Künstlerhaus in Salzburg, at the Leube Group Art's Program of Gartenau, Austria, at the IOR in London in 2003 and in 2005, at International Studio & Curatorial Program (ISCP), New York, in 2010, and at BAR International by Pikene på Broen, in Kirkenes, Norway, between 2010 and 2011. In 1998 he took part in the Marshall McLuhan Program in Culture and Technology in Toronto.

== Exhibitions ==
Cagol held a solo show at MART - Museum of Modern and Contemporary Art of Trento and Rovereto in 2000, curated by Gabriella Belli. His public art intervention Artists' bridges took place in Bolzano 2002. In 2004, he exhibited at Superdeluxe in Tokyo and the Stefan Stux Gallery project room in New York. In June–September 2005 he realized a solo exhibition, Babylon Zoo at the Oredaria Gallery in Rome (with a critical essay by Pier Luigi Tazzi), and a site specific installation in the hall of the Faculty of Sociology in Trento. In January 2005 he held a solo exhibition in London at Platform titled Lies (catalogue with a critical essay by Mami Kataoka).

In 2006, he exhibited Power Station as an official satellite project of the Singapore Biennale (the only Italian presence) and Bird Flu / Vogelgrippe as special project of 4th Berlin Biennale, supported by the Civic Gallery of Contemporary Art in Trento, Museion, the Museum of Modern and Contemporary Art of Bolzano and the Kunstraum of Innsbruck, Austria.

In 2007, he completed a solo public art installation for the façade of the BeursSchouwburg art center in Brussels (on view from 2007 till 2012). In the same year he realized a project - together with Stealth.ultd, Rotterdam - at Kunst Merano Arte for From & To, a solo public art intervention in Venice called Head Flu, and a solo show at NADiff - New Art Diffusion, Tokyo.

In 2008, he realized a Parallel Event to Manifesta 7, a special project for the farewell event of Jan Hoet at MARTa Herford in Germany, a public art installation on Petřín Tower at Tina B contemporary art festival in Prague. During the same year he took part in Eurasia at Museum of Modern and Contemporary Art of Trento and Rovereto, in Arrivals and Departures at White Box, New York city, in The Peekskill Project at HVCCA – Hudson Valley Center for Contemporary Art, New York.

In 2009, he presented his solo project 11 settembre simultaneously at MART – Museum of Modern and Contemporary Art of Trento and Rovereto, at Kunstraum Innsbruck, and at ZKM Karlsruhe, where the artwork became part of the collection. With Error One, he realized a public art installation at MuHKA in Antwerp. On September he was announced as winner of the Terna Prize 02 – for the Megawatt category.

In 2010, he exhibited at the Paul Robeson Gallery of Rutgers University in Newark in Bittersweet, at the Other Gallery in Shanghai in Suspension of Disbilief, at Palazzo della Triennale in Milan, at SUPEC – Shanghai Urban Planning Exhibition Center.

In 2011, he held a solo show at Priska C. Juschka Fine Art in New York titled Stockholm Syndrome.

He took part in 54. International Art Exhibition – La Biennale di Venezia with an official collateral event / solo show Concilio curated by Gregor Jansen at San Gallo Church.

His project The End of the Border (of the mind), commissioned by the Barents Art Triennale at the extreme northern border of Norway, had its start from the Vajont dam in Italy in the fifth anniversary of the tragedy and developed as a trip / expedition in March and April 2012.

He took part in 55. International Art Exhibition – La Biennale di Venezia with the project The Ice Monolith part of the Maldives National Pavilion curated by CPS Chamber of Public Secrets at Gervasuti Foundation, Venezia. In 2014 he took part in Critical ways of seeing at Goldsmiths (University of London).

Cagol wins in 2014 Visit Artist in residence program of the German Innogy Stiftung, former RWE Foundation, with the trans-national project The Body of Energy, that develops between museums and power plants between 2014 and 2015, and ongoing.

As winner of the Italian Council 2019 he realized an international project titled The Time of the Flood. Beyond the myth through climate change btw Berlin, Tel Aviv, Roma, Venice and Vienna promoted and supported by Ministry of Culture (Italy) MIBAC.

In 2022 he realized a performance at the Kunstmuseum Wolfsburg as part of the exhibition Power! Light!, the solo screening Far Before and After Us at Kunsthall 3.14 in Bergen and participated in Pear + Flora + Fauna. The Story of Indigenousness and the Ownership of History, Perak-Malaysia State Pavilion, a collateral event of the 59th Venice Biennale.

== Curatorial and Institutional Work ==
Since 2023, Cagol has served as Artistic Director of Castel Belasi – Contemporary Art Center for Eco Thought in Segonzone (Campodenno, Trentino, Italy) focused on ecological practices and interdisciplinary dialogue between art and science.

Cagol conceived and curates We Are the Flood, an ongoing interdisciplinary art project and platform initiated at MUSE – Museo delle Scienze di Trento. The platform addresses the climate crisis, anthropocenic interactions, and ecological transition through exhibitions, performances, masterclasses, art residencies, research activities, and collaborative networks of artists and scientists.

In 2024, the project was documented in a publication, We Are the Flood. Stefano Cagol, published by Postmedia Books. The volume includes contributions by theorists and practitioners such as Timothy Morton, among others.

In 2025, Cagol was named curator of Soil Art Tales, organized by the Global Network of Water Museums (WAMU‑NET) with 25 partner institutions across the EU in the frame of SoilTribes – Glocal Ecosystems Restoring Soil Values, Roles and Connectivity, a European Union–funded project under Horizon Europe and the mission A Soil Deal for Europe. The initiative seeks innovative artistic works exploring the theme of land and ecological issues, supporting selected artists with stipends and production budgets for exhibitions in museums across Europe.

Time that 'perhaps' unveils Truth is an online exhibition curated by Stefano Cagol for the UniCredit Art Collection, exploring temporality, perception, and knowledge in a digital format (December 2025).

== Recognition and Other Activities ==
Cagol has been recognised by the Italian Council (2019, 2023) of the Italian Ministry of Culture for contemporary art projects. He has lectured and presented his work at institutions including the IBSA Foundation for Scientific Research (Lugano), Bauhaus University (Weimar), and Accademia di Belle Arti di Brera (Milan).

== Public collections ==
Works by Stefano Cagol are in the collections of Videoteca of GAM, Torino, MART - Museum of Modern and Contemporary Art of Trento and Rovereto, Unicredit, Terna Group, Seat, Nomas Foundation, ZKM Center for Art and Media Karlsruhe, Museion (Bozen), Federal Ministry of the Environment, Nature Conservation and Nuclear Safety.
