= Castel Belasi – Contemporary Art Center for Eco Thought =

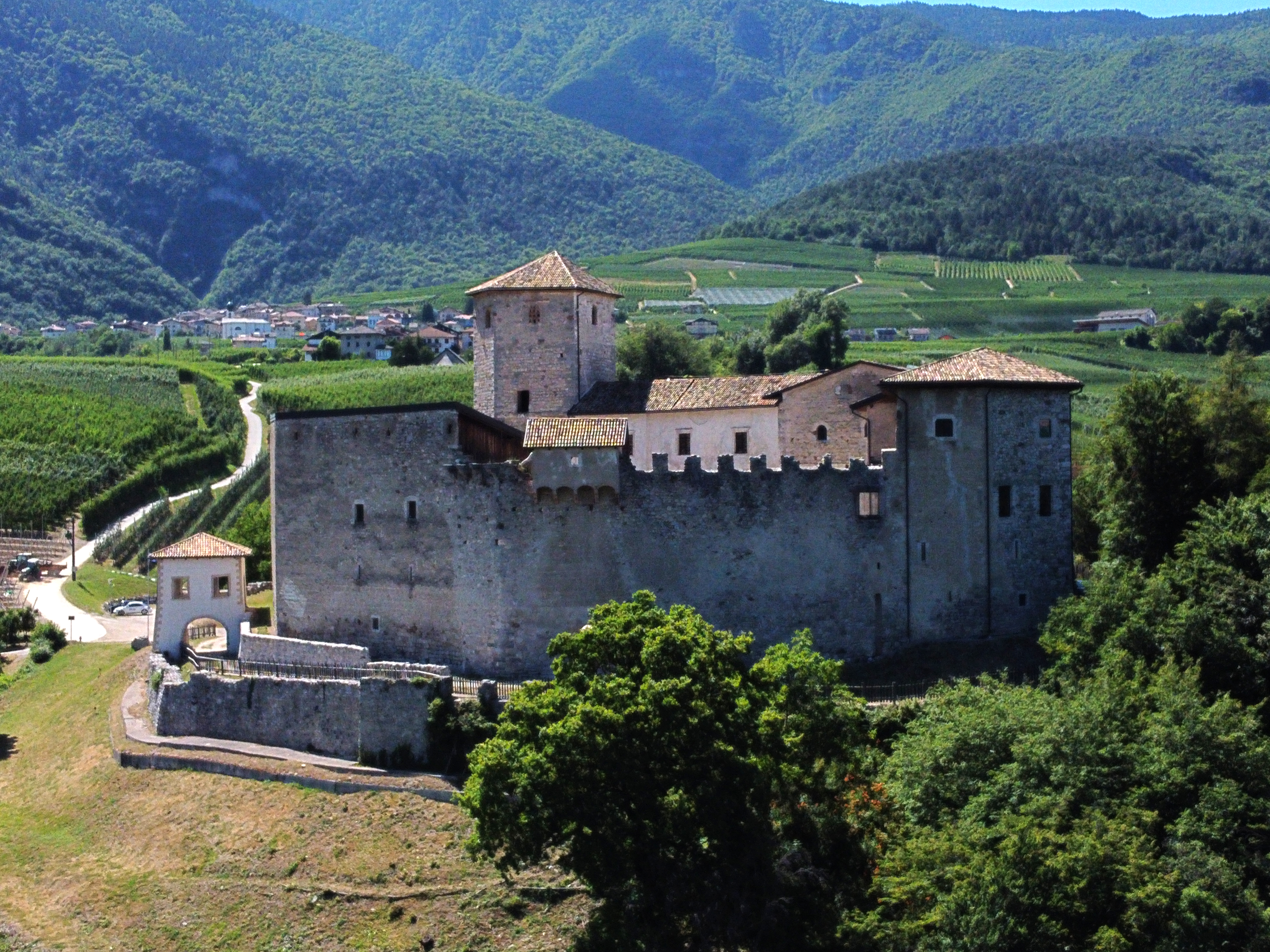
Castel Belasi. Segonzone, Campodenno. Val di Non, Trentino. Italy

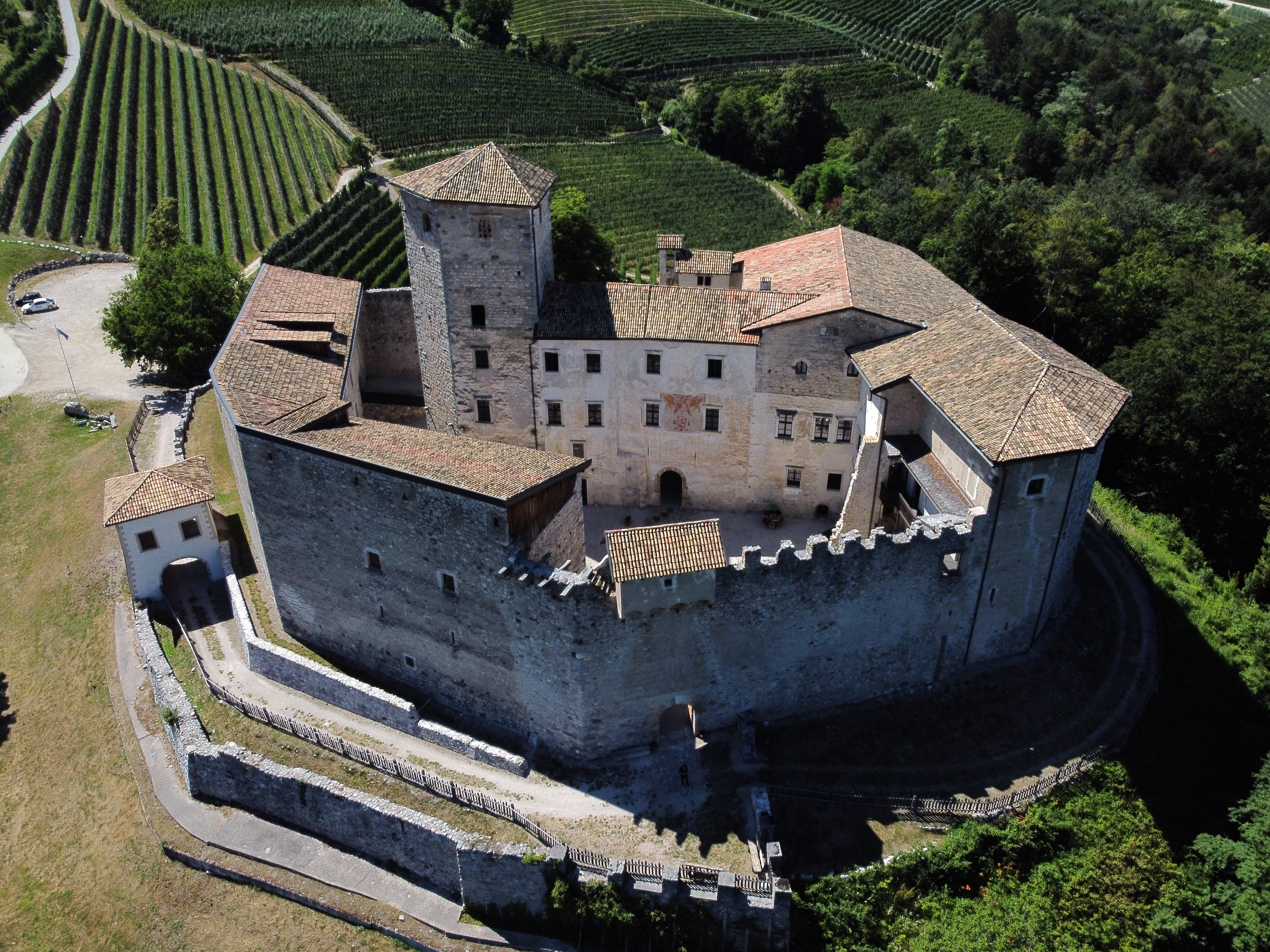
Castel Belasi. Segonzone, Campodenno. Val di Non, Trentino. Italy

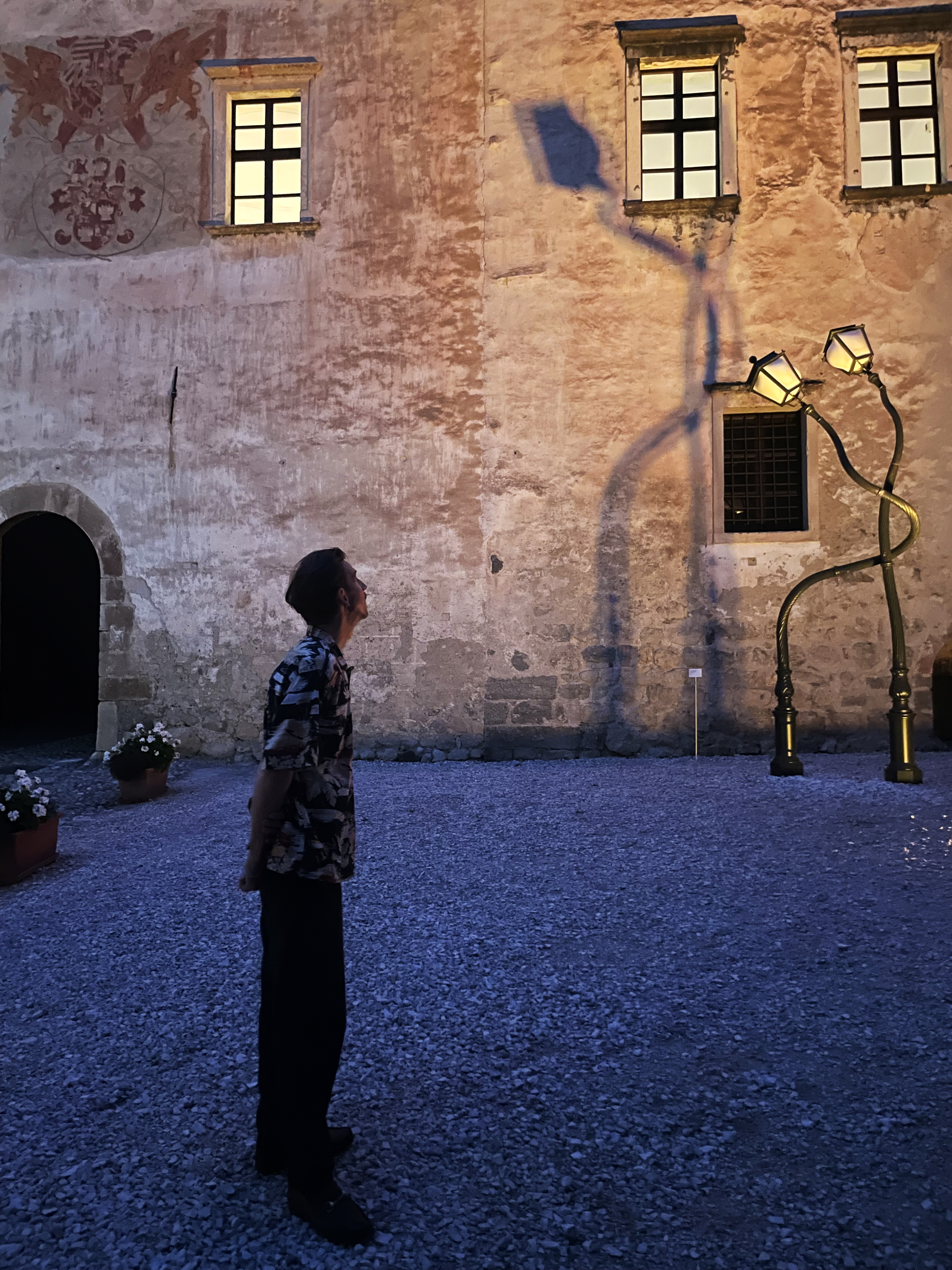
Courtyard Castel Belasi. Pieke Bergmans, "Totally in Love", long term installation, courtesy Berengo Fondation.

Castel Belasi is a contemporary art centre dedicated to ecological thought and practice, located in Segonzone, a hamlet of Campodenno in Trentino, northern Italy. It is housed in a medieval castle at the foot of the Brenta Dolomites, probably built in the 13th century, which gave its name to the noble family of the Khuen-Belasi counts. The centre has been open to the public since 2021 and has been directed artistically by Stefano Cagol since 2023. It operates as an institution of the Municipality of Campodenno in collaboration with the MUSE – Science Museum of Trento.

== Contemporary art centre ==
A project inspired by the frescoes of Castel Belasi is the Contemporary Art Center for Eco Thought, directed by Stefano Cagol. The centre uses the castle's historic frescoes, including the Judgement of Paris, as a starting point for international contemporary art exhibitions focusing on sustainability, the human-nature relationship, and current environmental challenges. These exhibitions create a dialogue between past and present through art and science.

Notable exhibitions, such as Fragile and As Ice, have featured works by internationally renowned artists, including Ai Weiwei, Tony Cragg and AES+F integrated with the castle's historic and artistic context to raise awareness of ecological issues.

=== Conceptual framework ===
- Ethical message: The castle's Renaissance frescoes, including the Judgement of Paris, are interpreted as reminders of the consequences of human choices, a central theme of the art centre.
- Dialogue across eras: Castel Belasi combines its medieval structure and frescoes with contemporary art installations, establishing a connection between historical lessons and present and future environmental challenges.

=== Mission ===
The institution's mission is to foster dialogue between contemporary art and ecological issues, including environmental change, sustainability, and political ecology, linking the specific and the global. The curatorial project draws inspiration from the manor's historic frescoes, addressing themes of responsibility and the consequences of human choices. The exhibition programme reflects on present challenges through international contemporary art exhibitions and interdisciplinary projects, developed in partnership with scientific institutions, cultural organisations, and research bodies.

=== Exhibitions ===
Castel Belasi realizes a range of exhibitions that explore ecological, scientific, and social topics, often produced in collaboration with the MUSE – Science Museum and other partners:

Title	Dates	Curator	Artists	Description	Reference
The Fate of Energy. Glacial Ices, Overheating and Divinations	27 May – 30 October 2022	Emanuele Quinz	Stefano Cagol	Solo exhibition by Stefano Cagol presenting works on energy, climate change, glaciers and rituals.	
Project Room No. 1, #2, #3	25 June – 30 October 2022	Mariella Rossi	Aldo Valentinelli, Paola Boscaini, Silvia Bonenti	Three solo exhibition devoted to the artists' vision of nature through the medium of painting.	
As Rain	11 June – 29 October 2023	Stefano Cagol	Eugenio Ampudia; Saverio Bonato; Stefano Caimi; Hannes Egger; Nezaket Ekici; Micol Grazioli; Elena Lavellés; Silvia Listorti; Mary Mattingly; Philipp Messner; Giulia Nelli; Hannah Rowan; Giacomo Segantin; g. olmo stuppia	Group exhibition from the We Are the Flood platform focusing on water and climate themes.	
Project Room: Come Pioggia. Generazione Antropocene	11 June – 29 October 2023	Julie Reiss	Eleonora Ambrosini; Eduardo De Maio; Francesca Fattinger; Pamela Frasson; Angela Fusillo; Marco Gentilini; Nicoletta Grillo; Lisa Guerra; Angela Miceli; Paola Monardo; Isabella Nardon; Jacopo Noera; Leonardo Panizza; Edoardo Spata; Maria Chiara Wang	Project Room exhibition presenting works by Italian artists developed within the We Are the Flood #1 masterclass, focusing on Anthropocene-related environmental and ecological themes.	
As Islands	1 June – 27 October 2024	Stefano Cagol	Janet Bellotto; Stefano Cagol; Wim Delvoye; Heba Dwaik; Annamaria Gelmi; Mary Mattingly; Gianni Motti; PSJM; Thiago Rocha Pitta; Esther Stocker; Michela Longone; Silvia Negrini; Monica Smaniotto; Marco Tagliafico	Exhibition exploring mountain landscapes as islands in the context of climate change.	
Project Room: Theories of Climes	2024	Alessandro Castiglioni; Antonella Anedda; Franco Buffoni	Giuseppe Bergamino; Noemi Cammareri; Andrea Gubitosi; Lorena Ortells; Nadia Tamanini; Gloria Tamborini; and contributions by Paula Aguilera; Irene Bernardi; Eleni Kosmidou; Giacomo Pigliapoco	Exhibition presenting works by under-35 artists connected to the We Are the Flood #2 masterclass.	
As Ice	10 May – 26 October 2025	Stefano Cagol	AES+F; Almagul Menlibayeva; Caroline McManus; Eleonora Roaro; Emilio Perez; Gregor Hildebrandt; Khaled Ramadan; Indra Moroder Valecha; Ivínguak` Stork Høegh; Laura Pugno; Peter Aerschmann; Philip Samartzis; Pietro Capogrosso; Yitian Yan	Group exhibition reflecting on fragility and disappearance within climate change.	
Project Room: From the Anthropocene to the Biocene	10 May – 26 October 2025	Blanca de la Torre	Maria Giovanna Abbate; Giulia Broz; Elisa Cappellari; Florinda Ciucio; Michela De Nichilo; Stefano Ferrari; Arianna Marcolin; Camilla Prey; Roxane Erika Roehrig	Project Room exhibition of under-35 artists from the We Are the Flood #3 masterclass on ecology and creative practice.	
Raccolti e Racconti. The Biodiversity in Botanical Art	10 May – 22 June 2025	Helen Catherine Wiesinger	(Various botanical artists)	Exhibition celebrating plant biodiversity as part of Botanical Art Worldwide Italy.	
Fragile. A Selection of Glasstress	6 July – 26 October 2025	Sandrine Welte; Adriano Berengo	Ai Weiwei; Jaume Plensa; Tony Cragg; Thomas Schütte; Laure Prouvost; Erwin Wurm; Pieke Bergmans; Lolita Timofeeva; Mimmo Paladino; Wael Shawky; Marya Kazoun; Anna Jermolaewa; Monira Al Qadiri; Koen Vanmechelen; Mat Collishaw; Jimmie Durham; Ryan Gander; Cornelia Parker; Fred Wilson; Marta Klonowska; Loris Cecchini	Group exhibition of contemporary glass works from Berengo Studio reflecting on fragility and sustainability.	
Nature Feeling Form. What if Susanne Langer would meet Alex Langer?	16 September – 26 October 2025	Riccardo Lisi; co-curated with Lukas Willmann; scientific supervision by Stefano Cagol	Alfredo Aceto; Luka Berchtold; Hugo Canoilas; Kevin Carrozzo; Martina Casey; Cut and Scrape (George Rei); Gaia Di Bello; Karin Ferrari; Byron Gago; Hanakam & Schuller; Nanna Kaiser; Sandro Pianetti; Sarah Rechberger; Corinne L. Rusch; Gloria Tomasini; Cassidy Toner; Paulo Wirz	Group exhibition reflecting on perceptions of nature through multidisciplinary artistic practices.	

=== Collaborations and partnerships ===
Castel Belasi maintains a long‑term partnership with MUSE – Science Museum of Trento and the Municipality of Campodenno for joint projects that bridge contemporary art and scientific research on sustainability and ecological issues.

=== Anthropocene collection ===
The 'Anthropocene collection' is a contemporary art collection dedicated to artistic engagement with the environmental and social transformations of the current geological epoch. Founded by Stefano Cagol in collaboration with MUSE and supported by the Piano per l'Arte Contemporanea (PAC), the collection originates largely from works first presented in the 2023 exhibition Come Pioggia and was developed through the We Are the Flood art platform. It was first presented at MUSE on 30 November 2024 and displayed until 19 January 2025, featuring diverse media including video, photography, and site‑specific works. The collection is intended to grow with future acquisitions and projects, and may be shown in other institutional settings beyond MUSE.

=== Artistic direction ===
Since 2023, the artistic direction of Castel Belasi has been led by Stefano Cagol, an artist and curator engaged in contemporary art practices that intertwine ecological thought, political ecology, and interdisciplinary discourse between art and science.

=== Accessibility and visitor information ===
Castel Belasi is open to the public from June to October, with regular opening hours. Visitors benefit from barrier‑free access and facilities including an elevator, and reduced or free admission options for certain groups, in line with its mission to engage broad audiences in ecological reflection and cultural participation.

== History of the castle ==
=== Origins ===
For a long time, based on a theory proposed by the historian Carl Ausserer, it was believed that the castle already existed in the 12th century and was held by an ancient Belasi family, vassals of the Counts of Appiano. According to this interpretation, an Adelpreto de Bellago, mentioned in a document dated 1189, was considered a member of this family. Following the extinction of the Belasi lineage in 1291, the castle was thought to have been enfeoffed to Ulrich of Ragogna.

This reconstruction was also reported, though with reservations, by Aldo Gorfer, who suggested that the name Belasi derived from the personal name Belasio (Blasius), possibly referring to a castellan in the service of the Counts of Appiano or the Flavon family.

More recent research has shown that the castle is later in date than previously assumed and that the Adelpreto mentioned in 1189 was unrelated to Belasi, being instead connected with Plag, near Eppan an der Weinstraße. Consequently, no Belasi family existed in the 12th century. The construction of Castel Belasi has therefore been reassessed and dated to the second half of the 13th century, coinciding with the arrival of the Rubein-Ragogna family from the Burgraviate of Merano, loyal supporters of the Counts of Tyrol.

According to this interpretation, the castle was founded at the initiative of the Counts of Tyrol to control access to the Val di Non, which they had occupied during their conflict with the Prince-Bishops of Trento. Castel Belasi was subsequently entrusted to Ulrich of Ragogna, a Tyrolean captain.

In 1368, Conrad known as Khuen, son of Egenone of Tramin an der Weinstraße (documented in 1311), acquired Castel Belasi from Simon Rubein, Ulrich's nephew. The deed of transfer does not mention any payment, suggesting that the acquisition may have been linked to an outstanding debt. An alternative hypothesis, proposed in the 19th century by Stephan von Mayrhofen, holds that Conrad's eldest son Arnold married Elizabeth of Belasi, the last descendant of the Rubein family; however, no documentary evidence confirms this claim. The name Belasi therefore does not derive from an early castellan, but rather from the name of the hill on which the castle was built.

=== The Khuen-Belasi family ===
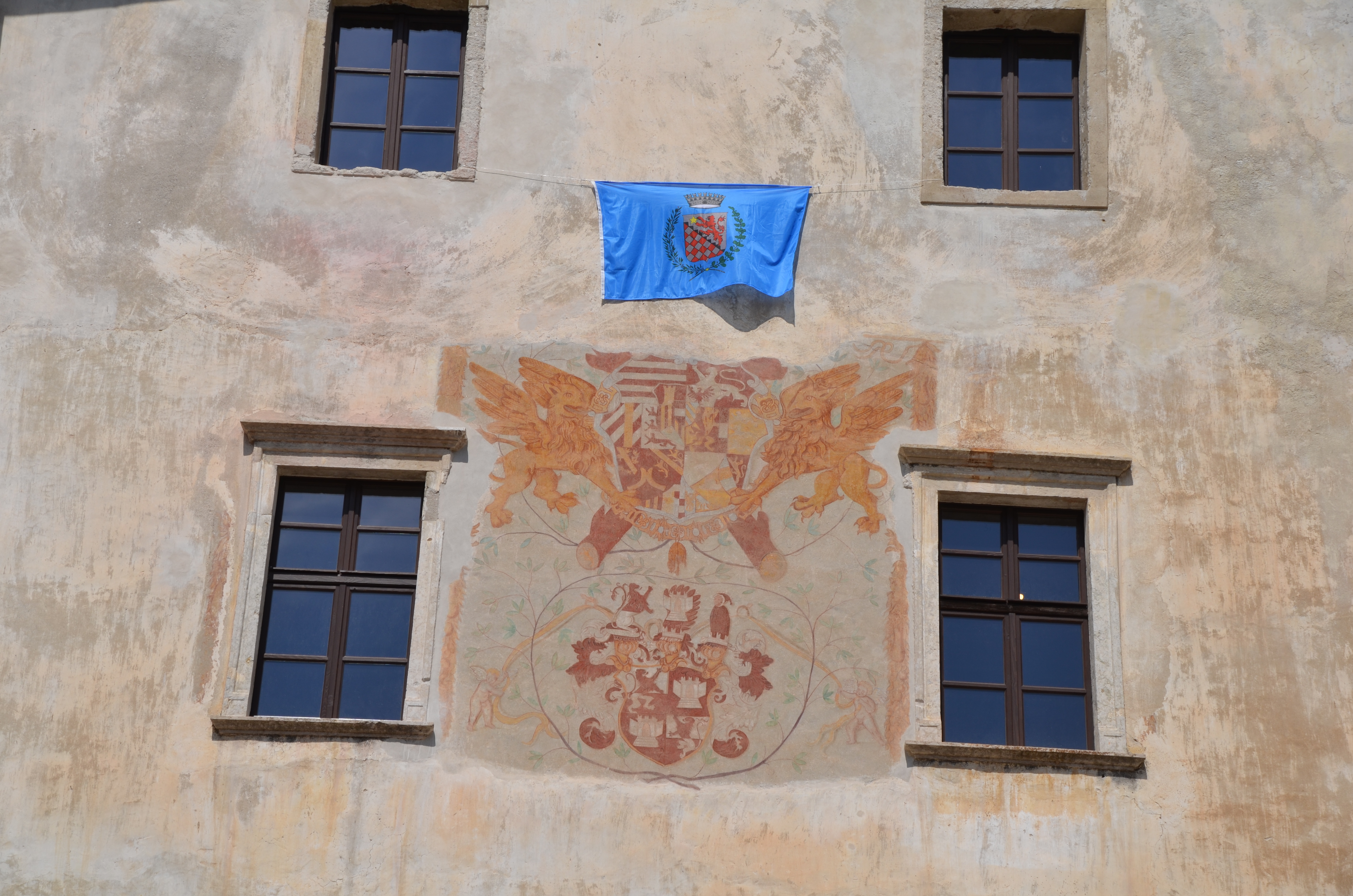
Coat of arms of the Khuen-Belasi family

In February 1368, Castel Belasi became the property of the Khuen family of Tramin, who permanently linked their history to that of the castle and adopted the name Khuen-Belasi. Between the 15th and 16th centuries, the family emerged as one of the wealthiest and most influential in the region, producing bishops, political figures and military leaders active throughout the Austrian territories.

Over time, the Khuen-Belasi family divided into several dynastic branches that extended their influence from Trentino to present-day Croatia, and were active at the courts of Vienna and Salzburg. During the late 15th and 16th centuries, the Khuen transformed Castel Belasi from a modest stronghold into a substantial fortress, austere in its external walls yet refined in its richly frescoed interiors.

Despite its strength, the castle fell to enemy forces on two occasions. Between 1415 and 1420, the rival Spaur lords captured and occupied the fortress for several years. In 1525, during the German Peasants' War, rebellious peasants looted the granaries of Castel Belasi.

The Khuen-Belasi family also acquired extensive rights over the surrounding rural communities. The inhabitants of Lover, Segonzone, Campodenno and Dercolo were required to pay agricultural tithes to the castle. Over time, the estate expanded considerably, encompassing farmland, vineyards, meadows and woodland, with Castel Belasi functioning as the administrative centre of a large landed property.

In the 18th century, after obtaining the title of Counts of the Holy Roman Empire, the Khuen-Belasi continued to embellish the castle, decorating its interiors with refined stucco work and ceramic stoves in accordance with contemporary taste. Although the castle had lost its military function, it remained economically active as the centre of a large agricultural estate, as evidenced by the extensive stables, barns and storage buildings adjoining the outer walls.

=== 19th and 20th centuries ===
During the 19th century, following the Napoleonic wars and the abolition of noble privileges, Castel Belasi was largely abandoned and relegated to use as a summer residence. Its owners were frequently engaged in political and military careers in Austria and Bavaria, marking the beginning of a prolonged period of decline.

Between the First and Second World Wars, members of the Khuen family returned to live at the castle for several decades. In the 1950s, however, Castel Belasi was definitively abandoned. Deprived of its furnishings, the building fell into severe disrepair, a condition that worsened steadily until the late 1990s.

=== Restoration and public access ===
In 2000, the entire complex, together with the nearby Church of Saints Philip and James (Campodenno), was purchased by the municipality of Campodenno, which initiated a comprehensive restoration programme. Initial works focused on stabilising the hill, affected by hydrogeological instability that threatened the structure. Subsequent interventions secured the roofs, consolidated masonry and floors, and restored the architectural elements necessary for public access.

Following the completion of restoration works, Castel Belasi has been open to visitors since 2019 and currently hosts exhibitions and cultural events, particularly during the summer season.

== Architecture and historical heritage ==
The castle stands on a gentle hill, surrounded by woods and orchards. Its structure is largely intact, although it no longer contains the original furnishings. The building features a pentagonal keep and high defensive walls, to which structures from different periods are attached. Two bartizans are positioned along the walls near the main entrances. On the southern side, two minor walls are connected by a ravelin that overlooks the approach to the main entrance. Overall, Castel Belasi illustrates the architectural evolution of a medieval fortress transformed into a noble residence, combining fortifications, residential spaces, and artistic heritage in a single complex.

=== Frescoes ===
The most significant frescoes date to the 16th century, although earlier decorative work, discovered during restoration on a first-floor corridor, depicts late medieval castle motifs such as tournaments, coats of arms, crests and musicians. Later decorations include the Music and Fruits Room, showing draped parapets with musical instruments, fruit and vegetables, and a room with a fresco of the Judgement of Paris, attributed to the German painter Bartlmä Dill Riemenschneider, son of Tilman Riemenschneider. Another room, the Metamorphoses Room, presents scenes from Ovid's Metamorphoses. A large family coat of arms on the central palace façade is surmounted by the arms of Ferdinand II, Archduke of Austria, dated to the 1560s.

=== Chapel of Saint Martin ===
In the western courtyard, attached to the central palace, is the family chapel dedicated to Martin of Tours. The chapel, decorated with frescoes from the 15th and 16th centuries, is connected to a first-floor room of the palace via a window, allowing the counts to attend services from inside the castle.
