= Tozer Pak =

Artist from Hong Kong

Tozer Pak Sheung Chuen (simplified Chinese: 白双全; traditional Chinese: 白雙全) (born 1977) is a Hong Kong artist.

He represented Hong Kong at the 53rd Venice Biennale in 2009, with a solo exhibition titled Harbour, Hong Kong, Alienated Cities and Dreams, featuring 4 site-specified installations.

He is known for the documentation of chance encounters and unconventional uses of daily objects in his artwork.

== Early life and education ==
He was born in 1977 in Fujian and immigrated to Hong Kong in 1984. He obtained his Bachelor of Arts degree from the Chinese University of Hong Kong in 2002 with a major in fine arts and a minor in theology. He was awarded the Overseas Exchange Prize (Chinese Performance Art) by the Macao Museum of Art in 2005, and sponsored by the Lee Hysan Foundation Fellowship to take up residency in the International Studio & Curatorial Program in New York City in 2007.

== Artistic career ==
Pak is known for his attempts in "calibrating and transforming uncontrollable variables" in daily life. His artwork often features chance encounters, conversations, and discovery. His artwork is "difficult to collect and sell" and he has "no intention of participating in the system" of art commercialization. His style of art is described as "almost invisible, almost impossible to document, but manages to explore the human condition in all its complexities and with loving precision."

Time is a re-current element's in Pak's work. In the work "Waiting for a Friend" (2006), he stood still in a subway station in Hong Kong, to wait until a friend would, by chance, pass by. After a while, a friend did pass by. His friend asked Pak, "Why do you know I will walk through there ?". Pak replied "I don't know, but I have waited for you for a long time !" Pak put a stop at constant rush of this fast city. He presented an alternate way of experiencing time, experiencing the city.

While in New York, he developed his "New York Public Library Projects", a series of covert interventions in New York's public libraries. In Norwegian Wood (2007), Pak interchanged pages from paper copies of the novel Norwegian Wood with actual leaves from Norway. In Page 22: Half-Folded Library, he covertly folded the corner of page 22 of 15,000 books in 58th Street Library, Manhattan. Pak commented that these projects turned a public library into a "private museum" with "site-specific installations", and considered his covert interventions in 58th Street Library as a "permanent", "solo exhibition". Pak participated in the 3rd Guangzhou Triennial (2008) with photographs of Page 22 as an exhibit. Some readers criticized the ethics of these covert art projects, to which Pak humorously responded that it is "a shortcut for your artwork to enter a big institution".

He participated in the 2008 Yokohama Triennial with the series Time Crevasse. It comprised two pieces of artwork exploring the concept of time: Inexistent Time was a film made from cutting and splicing the blank spaces between the frames of a motion film; Waiting for a Friend (Without an appointment) documented an experiment in which Pak selected a busy junction in Kowloon Tong station and waited until he met a friend by chance.

In 2009, Pak was selected to represent Hong Kong in the 53rd Venice Biennale, the first time an artist was chosen to be in charge of the entire Hong Kong Pavilion. The exhibition was titled Making (Perfect) World and comprised four sections: Harbour, Hong Kong, Alienated Cities, and Dreams. One piece of installation art in the exhibition had a "production cost [of] $0" because it exclusively used materials that Pak collected for free in Venice, such as pebbles and disused cords. Another notable exhibit featured bottles of seawater collected from Victoria Harbour. The work was called "The Horizon Placed At Home", talked about Hong Kong's density and people's desire for a home with sea view. Another piece was called "A Travel Without Visual Experience"

Pak's A Travel Without Visual Experience was collected by Tate. In order to produce this collection of photographs, Pak participated in a five-day organized tour to Malaysia but blindfolded himself throughout the trip.

Pak was recognized in 2011 as an Outstanding Artist and Promising Figure by Art Asia Pacific. He was commended with the Best Artist Award from CCAA (Chinese Contemporary Art Award) in 2012.

== Awards ==
In 2012, Pak Sheung Chuen won the Best Artist Award in the Chinese Contemporary Art Awards, and the HKADC Award for Best Artist in Visual Arts.

== Political views ==
Pak is critical of the Sports, Performing Arts, Culture and Publication constituency of Hong Kong, saying that it claims to represent the artistic industry in politics but the composition of its electorate is biased against individual artists. In the 2016 Election Committee election, Pak ran for election in the Culture subsector as a member of the pro-democracy ARTicipants caucus. He and his team were defeated by the pro-establishment caucus led by veteran actress Liza Wang.

== Personal life ==
Pak is a Christian and attends church regularly. He converted to Christianity while studying at a Christian secondary school, and disciplined himself by reading the Bible every morning. Pak is married and resides in Hong Kong.
