= Frances Goodman =

South African mixed-media artist (born 1975)

- Born: 1975 (age 50–51)
- Citizenship: South African
- Education: MA in Fine Arts in 2000 from Goldsmiths College, London. BA in Fine Arts at the University of the Witwatersrand, Johannesburg.
- Alma mater: Higher Institute for Fine Art in Antwerp, Belgium
- Occupation: Mixed-media artist
- Known for: Being a recipient of the Cecily Brown Fellowship for Outstanding Woman Artists in 2014

Frances Goodman (born 1975) is a South African mixed-media artist who currently lives in Johannesburg. Her work makes use of acrylic nails and other unconventional materials and is "interested in the relations between femininity, costuming, and role-playing".

== Education ==
From 1994-1997, Goodman worked on a BA in Fine Arts at the University of the Witwatersrand in Johannesburg. She then moved to London to attend Goldsmiths College in 1999, receiving an MA in Fine Arts in 2000. Afterward, she served as a laureate at the Higher Institute for Fine Art in Antwerp, Belgium from 2001 to 2003.

== Exhibitions and awards ==
Goodman has exhibited widely since 2002, with solo and group shows across Europe, North America, and Africa. In 2012, she was a resident at the International Studio & Curatorial Program in New York City. She was a recipient of the Cecily Brown Fellowship for Outstanding Woman Artists in 2014. Goodman's work appeared in the exhibition I Am . . .Contemporary Women Artists of Africa at the Smithsonian's National Museum of African Art from June 2019-April 2022.

== Work ==
Goodman often uses false eyelashes, fake nails, faux pearl earrings, and other "typically feminine" objects to create her sculptures and installations, looking at everyday obsessions and superficial behavior (such as fanatic exercise culture and conventions of marriage and beauty). “Women are often asked to make media-influenced choices about our bodies,” says Goodman. “Fake nails and false eyelashes, though, go against that. You’re able to become expressive, to become someone else. You don’t become the idea of who a woman should be. You become the antithesis.”
