= Frankfurter Kunstverein =

Coordinates: 50°06′39″N 8°40′58″E

The Frankfurter Kunstverein e. V. in Frankfurt am Main is a non-profit organisation dedicated to the promotion of contemporary art and culture. It is one of the oldest German art associations.

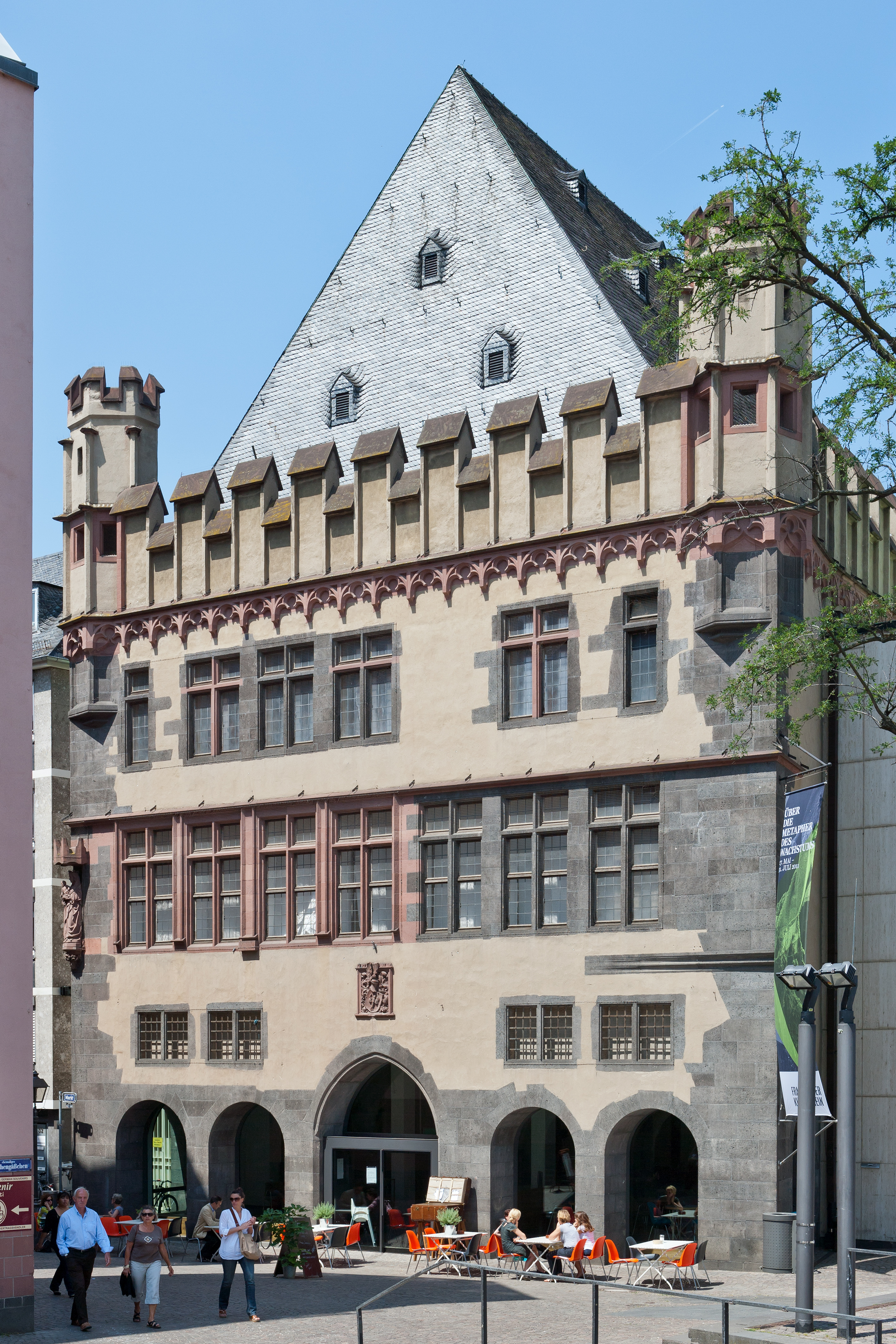
The museum in the "Steinernes Haus"

== History ==
Frankfurter Kunstverein

The Frankfurter Kunstverein was founded in 1829 by a group of influential citizens of Frankfurt am Main, including the senator and later mayor of the Free City of Frankfurt, Johann Gerhard Christian Thomas, the historian Johann Friedrich Böhmer and the art historian Johann David Passavant. Almost all of the city's important citizens and artists soon belonged to the association. Its purpose was to promote the appreciation of arts in the merchant city and to purchase works of art for the public.

As the financial resources of the Frankfurter Kunstverein were limited, it was dissolved in 1855. It was replaced by the newly founded public stock corporation "Frankfurter Kunstverein".

On 15 December 1926, the Frankfurter Kunstverein opened its large lottery exhibition in Junghofstraße, with works by Joseph Kaspar Correggio, Friedrich Mook, Joachim Ringelnatz and Carl Stoltz as prizes. In 1936 the Städelschule had an exhibition in the Frankfurter Kunstverein which featured graphic design from the class of Albert Windisch.

The Kunstverein's building in Junghofstraße, erected in 1861, was destroyed in a bombing raid in 1944. Before 1944, the Frankfurter Kunstverein had already been affected by the Nuremberg Laws and the persecution, expulsion or extermination of its Jewish members. As an institution affiliated to the Reich Chamber of Culture, it was temporarily banned by the American military government in 1945. In 1948, the Frankfurter Kunstverein moved into a new building at the Eschenheimer Anlage. The Frankfurter Kunstverein set itself the task of exhibiting artists who had not been on display during the Nazi era. However, the income was barely sufficient to cover the running costs. In the mid-1950s, the Frankfurter Kunstverein had to move out of the premises.

== Steinernes Haus ==
In 1962, after various temporary quarters, the Frankfurter Kunstverein moved into the Steinerne Haus on Römerberg, which had been in the possession of the organisation from 1905 until its destruction during the air raids on Frankfurt am Main in 1944. During reconstruction, the building was given a modernist cubic extension on the site of the former Haus Mohrenkopf, which considerably increased the exhibition space to around 900 square metres and created space for offices. With increased financial support from the city and under the new director Ewald Radtke, it was now possible to exhibit international art of the 20th century.

The entire ensemble is now a protected monument. A striking element of the architecture of the Frankfurter Kunstverein is the curved staircase in the interior of the new building, which is also the site of the mural "Treppenhaus II Experimenta 4 1971" (Reconstruction 1999) by Blinky Palermo. The architectural firm "Turkali Architekten" was responsible for large-scale modernisation measures in the entrance area and foyer in 1993. The arcades on the ground floor of the Steinernes Haus, which were originally used as exhibition space, have since been converted into a café.

As part of the Dom Römer project, the historically significant Markt and Hinter dem Lämmchen alleyways were rebuilt between 2013 and 2018 with their small-scale buildings, some of which were reconstructed according to historical models. As part of the project, the Frankfurter Kunstverein added a second entrance to the modern extension, which opens to the east onto the alleyway Hinter dem Lämmchen. Since 2014, under the leadership of art historian and curator Franziska Nori, the Frankfurter Kunstverein has realised outdoor sculptures by Joko Avianto (2015) and the artist duo Winter/Hörbelt (2018), which made a direct reference to the architecture and were on display over a period of several months. The association now has around 1000 members.

The Frankfurter Kunstverein was awarded the Binding-Kulturpreis in 2019. In 2020, the Frankfurter Kunstverein received the "Ausgezeichnet Ausgestellt" prize from the Dr. Marschner Foundation for the exhibition with Jeremy Shaw. In 2022, the exhibition Three Doors – Forensic Architecture/Forensis, Initiative 19. Februar, Initiative in Gedenken an Oury Jalloh won the art curator prize from art magazine.

== Directors of the Frankfurter Kunstverein (since 1945) ==
- Curt Gravenkamp (1945–1961)
  - Exhibitions (selection): Frankfurter Kunst der Gegenwart, 1947 ff; Fritz Winter, Mateo Cristiani, 1952; Ernst Wilhelm Nay; 1952, Georg Meistermann, 1953; Mateo Cristiani, Hanny Franke; 1955 Hann Trier, Joseph Kaspar Correggio, 1960
- Ewald Rathke (1961–1970)
  - – Exhibitions (selection): Edvard Munch, 1962; Amedeo Modigliani, 1963; Arnold Böcklin, 1964; Picasso Handzeichnungen, 1965; Wols – Gemälde, Aquarelle, Zeichnungen, Fotos, 1965/1966; Konstruktive Malerei, 1966/1967; Alexej Jawlensky, 1967; Kompass New York, 1967/1968.
- Georg Bussmann (1970–1980)
  - Exhibitions (selection): Kunst und Politik, 1970; Renato Guttuso, 1974; Kunst im 3. Reich. Dokumente der Unterwerfung. 1974; George Grosz, 1975
- Peter Weiermair (1980–1998)
  - Exhibitions (selection): Robert Mapplethorpe, 1981; Abraham David Christian, 1983, Franz Mon, 1986; Positionen schwedischer Malerei 1873–1995, 1995; PROSPECT Internationale Ausstellungen aktueller Kunst, 1986, 1993, 1996; Lynn Davis, 1990; Das Bild des Körpers, 1993; Luigi Ontani, 1996; Alfred Hrdlicka, 1997; Helen Levitt, 1998.
- Nicolaus Schafhausen (1999–2005)
  - Exhibitions (selection): Liam Gillick, 1999; To the people of the city of the Euro, 1999; Video-Installation Kino der Dekonstruktion, 1999 bis 2000; Stephen Prina, 2000; Christa Näher, 2001; Marcel Odenbach, 2002; fresh and upcoming, 2003; Nation, 2003; deutschemalereizweitausenddrei, 2003; Cerith Wyn Evans, 2004
- Chus Martínez (2006–2008)
  - Exhibitions (selection): The Martha Rosler Library, 2006; Whenever It Starts It Is The Right Time, Strategien für eine unstetige Zukunft, 2007; Tommy Støckel, 2007; The Great Transformation – Kunst und taktische Magie, 2008; Natascha Sadr Haghighian – Früchte der Arbeit, 2008;
- Holger Kube Ventura (2009–2014)
  - Exhibitions (selection): Das Wesen im Ding, 2010; Sven Johne: Berichte zwischen Morgen und Grauen, 2010; Tales of Resistance and Change – Artists from Argentina, 2010; Die Welt der Weber und Pistolenträger, 2011; Maya Schweizer und Clemens von Wedemeyer Metropolis – Bericht über China, 2011; Über die Metapher des Wachstums, Ragnar Kjartansson, 2011; Grenzen anderer Natur – Zeitgenössische Fotokunst aus Island, 2012; Demonstrationen – Vom Werden normativer Ordnungen, 2012; Kunstgeschichten im Steinernen Haus (1962–2012) – To the People of the City, 2013; Vereinzelt Schauer – Formen von Wetter.
- Franziska Nori (since 2014)
  - Exhibitions (selection): Thomas Feuerstein: Psychoprosa, 2015; Trevor Paglen: The Octopus, 2015; Body-Me: The Body in the Age of Digital Technology, 2015; Roots. Indonesian Contemporary Art, 2015; Mechanisms of Power, 2015; Paulo Nazareth: Aqui é Arte, 2016; Atchilihtallah – On the Transformation of Things, 2016; Things I Think I Want: Six Positions of Contemporary Art, 2017; Melanie Bonajo: Single Mother Songs from the End of Nature, 2017; Perception is Reality: On the Construction of Reality and Virtual Worlds, 2017; I am here to learn: On Machinic Interpretations of the World, 2018, (Co-Kreation Mattis Kuhn); Reconnecting with the World: About the Poetic in Elements and Materials, 2018; Yves Netzhammer / Theo Jansen / Takayuki Todo: Empathic Systems, 2019; Trees of Life – Stories for a Damaged Planet, 2019; Edmond's Prehistoric Realm – A Dinosaur Excavation in Frankfurt, 2020; How to Make a Paradise – Seduction and Dependence in Generated Worlds (Co-Kuration Mattis Kuhn), 2020; Jeremy Shaw – Phase Shifting Index, 2020; The Intelligence of Plants, 2021; Three Doors, 2022; Where will we go from here? Twelve art stories told from Spain, 2022; Eva & Franco Mattes: Fake Views, 2023; Bending the Curve – Knowing, Acting, Caring for Biodiversity, 2023

== See also ==
- Kunstverein Bremen
- Kunstverein Nürnberg
