= Miha Štrukelj =

Slovenian visual artist (born 1973)

Miha Štrukelj is a visual artist working in painting, drawing, and site-specific work.

== Career ==
Štrukelj's work has been included in the National Collection of the Museum of Modern Art in Ljubljana. He has also been selected for "Slovenian Art 1995–2005" and "Seven Sins; Ljubljana–Moscow" at the same museum.

His work has been presented in "Vitamin P; New Perspectives in Painting" by Phaidon Press.

In 2009, he was an artist-in-residence at the International Studio & Curatorial Program (ISCP) in New York.

== Style ==
His art explores the mechanism of perception and (de-)construction of images, examining the position of individuals in urban landscapes and how built environment defines their existence.

== Accolades ==
Štrukelj has received three awards–a grant from the Pollock-Krasner Foundation 2008-09, the Henkel Drawing Award 2008, and the working scholarship of the Slovenian Ministry of Culture.

== Life ==
Štrukelj was born 1973 in Ljubljana, Slovenia. He lives and works in Ljubljana.

He represented Slovenia at the Venice Biennial in 2009.
