= Johann Trollmann =

German boxer (1907–1944)

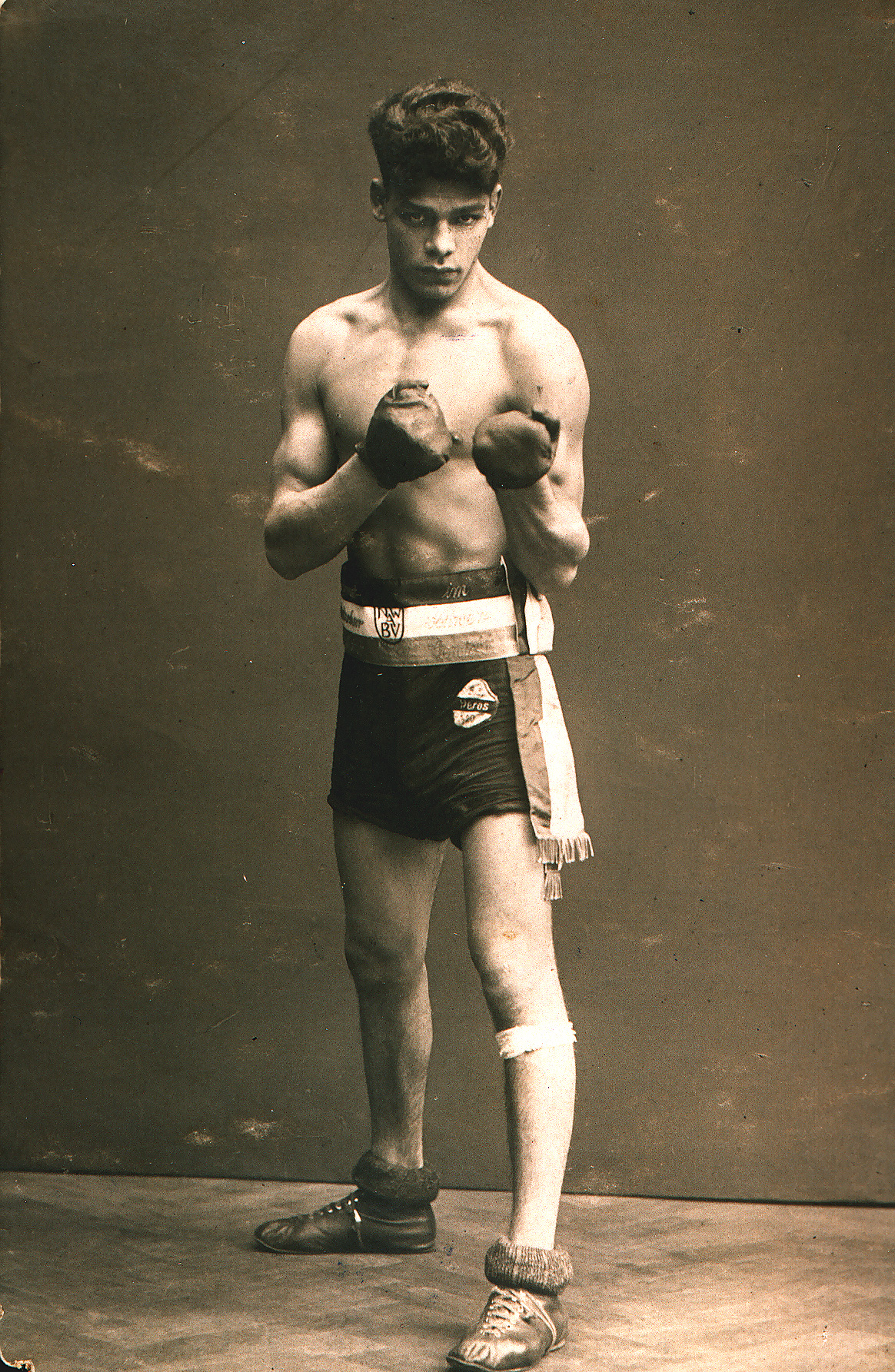
- Trollmann in 1928

Personal information
- Nickname: Rukeli
- Nationality: German
- Born: Johann Wilhelm Trollmann; 27 December 1907 Wilsche, Province of Hanover, Kingdom of Prussia, German Empire
- Died: 9 April 1944 (aged 36) Wittenberge, Brandenburg, Nazi Germany
- Height: ~1.80 m (5 ft 11 in)

Boxing career
- Weight class: Light heavyweight

Boxing record
- Total fights: 64
- Wins: 31
- Win by KO: 11
- Losses: 19
- Draws: 14

Johann Wilhelm "Rukeli" Trollmann (27 December 1907 – 9 April 1944) was a German Sinti boxer in the twilight years of the Weimar Republic. Although largely assimilated and of partial German descent, Trollmann was barred from professional boxing by the Nazi government, forcibly sterilised, and eventually murdered in a concentration camp.

== Early life ==
Trollmann was born in Wilsche, a village part of Gifhorn, into a poor Protestant family. His father, Wilhelm "Schnipplo" Trollmann (1867–1933), was an ethnic German umbrella maker and part-time musician, while his mother, Friederike "Pessy" Weiss (1874–1946), was of Sinti origin. He had eight siblings: his three sisters Maria, Anna, and Wilhelmine, and five brothers Wilhelm, Ferdinand, Julius, Albert, and Heinrich. The family moved to Hanover, settling in the Tiefental alley (now Johann-Trollmann-Weg) within the borough Hanover-Mitte, in the early 1910s. Trollmann attended the local Volksschule until third grade.

Trollmann picked up boxing when he was a child and had his first amateur match at eight years old. He was called "Rukeli" by other Sinti, derived from the Romani word for tree (rukh), for his upright stance. Trollmann's youngest brothers, Albert ("Benny") and Heinrich ("Stabeli"), also boxed in their private time.

Although the family had kept close ties to the Roma community, the Trollmanns were regarded as assimilated. Trollmann's father had served in Braunschweig's water police during World War I while the family of his mother had long abandoned their itinerant lifestyle.

== Career ==
=== Amateur boxing ===
Boxing as a sport had been severely limited during the German Empire, with outright bans in some regions. Training and professional matches became openly accessible in 1919 with the founding of the Weimar Republic. Trollmann entered the boxing scene in the early 1920s. He won the regional title of Hanover district's boxing championship four times in a row and became a member of the BC Heros Eintracht in 1922, thus joining the Deutsche Reichsverband für Amateur-Boxen (DRfAB). Trollmann became famous in the mid-1920s for winning the North-German amateur boxing championship.

With the rising popularity of boxing, Trollmann entered officially held matches as a middleweight by 1924. His looks made him popular with the audience, earning him compliments by both women and men during matches and dedicated columns in newspapers in his hometown. He was well-received for his distinct boxing style, which was compared to dance for Trollmann's quick and agile moves. Trollmann's critics primarily focused on his Romani heritage and mocked his technique as "un-German", with some newspapers derisively nicknaming him "the Dancing Gypsy" ("der tanzende Zigeuner") or just "Gipsy/Gibsy".

Trollmann sought to join the German national boxing team for the 1928 Summer Olympics, but was barred by officials, officially for "inedequate performance". For the middleweight class, the committee instead selected Walter Cunow, who had been previously defeated by Trollmann several times; Cunow himself would be replaced by Albert Leidmann. It has since been suspected that Trollmann's rejection was related to the Weimar government's unwillingness to be represented by a Sinto at the event.

=== Professional boxing ===
In June 1929, Trollmann left the BC Heros Eintracht and joined BC Sparta Linden, primarily made up of athletes with working class backgrounds, to focus on national competitions in professional sports. From then, he lived primarily in Berlin, being coached by Ernst Zirzow. Travelling throughout Germany, Trollmann fought against opponents, both German and foreign, in the welterweight to heavyweight classes.

==== Interference by the Nazi government ====
Following Adolf Hitler's rise to power in January 1933, the Nazi government officially renamed boxing to "German fistfighting" ("Deutscher Faustkampf") and declared the sport as an integral part of the effort to create a "defensible Volkskörper". The following month, DRfAB was restructured into Deutscher Amateur-Boxverband (DABV), part of the newly established centralised boxing association Verband Deutscher Faustkämpfer, under chairman Georg Radamm, a long-time member of the Nazi Party. The change led to informal discrimination against athletes with non-German or mixed ethnic backgrounds. Trollmann's family had been largely conservative, with Trollmann's eldest brother Wilhelm ("Carlo") joining the SA in 1933, but he was ousted the same year for being Roma.

On 9 June 1933, Trollmann fought for the German light-heavyweight title against Adolf Witt, in a highly publicised match attended by Nazi officials, including VDF chairman Radamm. Aware that Trollmann was likely to win, which would call the Nazi government's professed superiority of the German "Aryans" into question, Radamm had instructed the jury to judge "no result" and although Trollmann clearly led by points over the course of six rounds, the jury obeyed Radamm's instructions. The audience rebelled and after thirty minutes, the jury acknowledged Trollmann as the victor.

However, six days later he was stripped of the title, with a VDF letter stating that both fighters had "performed inadequately" and that Trollmann had shown "unsportsmanlike behaviour" by crying tears of joy while receiving the trophy belt. A new fight was scheduled for 21 July, with runner-up Gustav Eder, a heavyweight, as Trollmann's opponent. Trollmann was threatened that he had to change his "dancing" style or lose his licence. Trollmann arrived the day of the match with his hair dyed blond and his face whitened with flour, the caricature of an Aryan. He took the blows of his opponent as he was asked for five rounds before he collapsed. The defeat signalled his permanent expulsion from professional boxing, with his licence being revoked in the following autumn, but this did nothing to dismantle his popular image. To avoid further issues with Nazi officials, Trollmann briefly went into hiding in the region around Teutoburg Forest.

Between 1933 and 1935, Trollmann continued to earn a living as a boxer at carnivals and other small-scale events. He resided in Berlin-Charlottenburg with his girlfriend Olga Frieda Bilda (1915 – after 1975), having a daughter, Rita, in March 1935. The couple married on 1 June 1935.

== Detention ==
In July 1935, Trollmann was detained at Rummelsburg workhouse following a forced sterilisation order. With the introduction of the Nuremberg Laws in September 1935, the persecution of Sinti and Roma in Germany dramatically increased. Trollmann was labelled "feeble-minded since birth" and forcibly sterilised c. 23 December 1935, as part of Nazi eugenics efforts targeting ethnic minorities. In September 1938, Trollmann divorced from his wife in hopes of covering for his daughter who, under the Nuremberg Laws, would be judged a Mischling for being quarter-Sintiza.

By 1938, Trollmann had been transferred to Hannover-Ahlem subcamp, but was released the same year. In November 1939 he was drafted into the Wehrmacht as an infantryman. He was stationed in occupied France, Belgium, and Poland, where he was wounded in June 1941 during the early stages of Operation Barbarossa, being returned to Germany as a result; he was officially discharged in early 1942, when Sinti and Roma were banned from serving in the military.

The Gestapo arrested Trollmann in June 1942 while in Hanover. He was tortured during custody at the city's branch office of the Reichszentrale zur Bekämpfung des Zigeunerunwesens and in October of the same year, he was interned at Neuengamme concentration camp in Hamburg. He tried to keep a low profile, but was recognized by Schutzhaftlagerführer Albert Lütkemeyer, who had been a boxing official before the war. He used Trollmann as a trainer for his troops during the nights in exchange for a slice of buttered bread for each time Trollmann was knocked out. Having already lost 30 kg before arriving in Neuengamme, the spars were treated as leisure by the SS guards and regularly devolved into beatdowns, causing Trollmann's health to deteriorate further. After three months, the prisoners committee decided to act and faked Trollmann's death on 9 February 1943, being listed in the camp book as having died of pneumonia compounded by vascular disease. His family received an urn, which was buried at Anger Cemetery in Hanover. In reality, the committee had managed to get him transferred to the Wittenberge satellite camp under an assumed identity.

=== Death ===
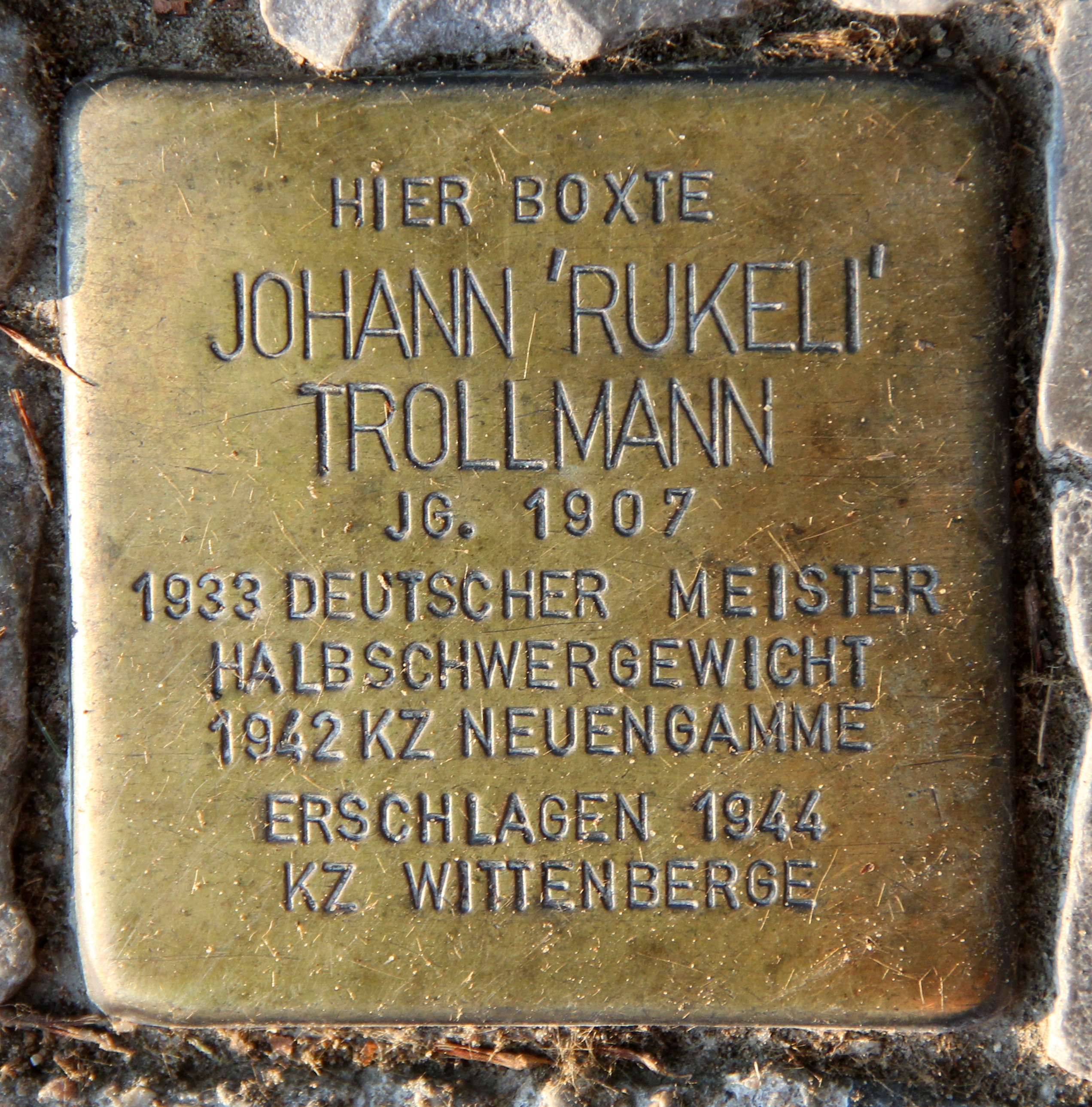
A Stolperstein in memory of Trollmann outside of Bockbrauerei in Berlin-Kreuzberg

By spring 1944, the former star was again recognised and the camp elders organized a fight between him and Emil Cornelius, a former criminal and hated "Heu" commando Kapo (a prisoner given privileges for taking on responsibilities in the camp, often a convict working for a reduced sentence or parole). Trollmann won, Cornelius sought revenge for his humiliation and forced Trollmann to work all day until he was exhausted, before attacking and killing him with a shovel. Trollmann was 36 years old. According to fellow Sinto internee Rudolf Landsberger, the SS covered up the death as an accident and buried Trollmann in a forest outside the town cemetery.

Two of Trollmann's brothers also died as a result of the Romani Holocaust: his youngest brother Heinrich, who had also been a communist, died in Auschwitz concentration camp on 13 November 1943, while another brother, Julius ("Mauso"), died in 1958 from long-term health effects of his imprisonment, having been rendered paraplegic from severe beatings at a hard labour camp.

== Rehabilitation and commemoration ==
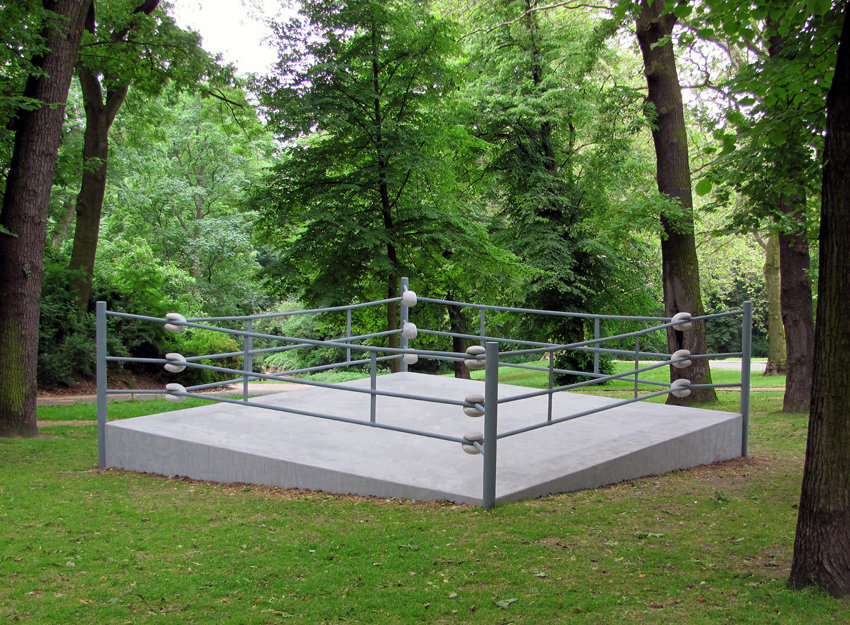
9841- Temporary memorial for Johann Rukeli Trollmann in Berlin-Kreuzberg, 2010

In 2003, the German boxing federation officially recognised Trollmann as the winner of the 1933 championship.

On 13 November 2008, a plate memorial (Stolperstein) was installed outside the former location of his family home, which was destroyed during the bombing of Hanover in World War II. Two additional plates, commemorating his brothers Heinrich and Julius, were put in place on 22 March 2010 and 12 June 2013 respectively.

On 9 June 2010, the anniversary of his championship fight, the German artist collective Bewegung Nurr erected a temporary memorial "9841" in the Berlin Victoria Park to honour Trollmann. The memorial was also displayed the following year in Hannover and in Dresden in 2012 for six weeks. The title refers to Trollmann's prison number.

In 2015, the Italian alternative rock band C.F.F. e il Nomade Venerabile released the song Come fiori dedicated to Trollmann. This song was the inspiration for the theathral show My Inv(f)erno... gypsy life which opened the X edition of the International TeatroLab Festival at the Tagliavini theatre in Novellara in March 2019.

In 2016, Dario Fo, recipient of the 1997 Nobel Prize in Literature, published the book Razza di zingaro based on Trollmann's life.

In 2019, Trollmann's daughter, Rita Vowe-Trollmann, visited the memorial center of Neuengamme concentration camp, where her father died, for the first time, viewing his death records.

In 2022, the German television series Babylon Berlin season four, a fictional version of Trollmann is portrayed by Hannes Wegener and is revealed to be the half-brother of one of the series' leads, Lotte Ritter. A fight takes place between Trollman and Willy Bolze, who in real life was Trollman's first professional boxing opponent. The dates are different in the show with their fight taking place in 1931 instead of 1929.

== Professional boxing record ==
64 fights	31 wins	19 losses
By knockout	11	7
By decision	19	12
By disqualification	1	0
Draws	14	

No.	Result	Record	Opponent	Type	Round	Date	Location	Notes
64	Loss	31–19–14	Arthur Polter	PTS	8	Mar 12, 1934	Palmengarten, Leipzig, Gau Saxony, Nazi Germany	
63	Loss	31–18–14	Walter Müller	PTS	6	Mar 9, 1934	Wilmersdorfer Tennishalle, Wilmersdorf, Gau Berlin, Nazi Germany	
62	Loss	31–17–14	Walter Sabottke	KO	6 (8)	Feb 9, 1934	Spichernsäle, Wilmersdorf, Gau Berlin, Nazi Germany	
61	Loss	31–16–14	Rienus de Boer	KO	6 (8)	Dec 26, 1933	Rheinlandhalle, Cologne, Gau Cologne-Aachen, Nazi Germany	
60	Loss	31–15–14	Walter Sabottke	PTS	8	Dec 3, 1933	Flora Theater, Sternschanze, Gau Hamburg, Nazi Germany	
59	Loss	31–14–14	Erwin Bruch	TKO	2 (8)	Nov 25, 1933	Spichernsäle, Wilmersdorf, Gau Berlin, Nazi Germany	
58	Win	31–13–14	Gustav Eybel	PTS	10	Nov 5, 1933	Flora Theater, Sternschanze, Gau Hamburg, Nazi Germany	
57	Loss	30–13–14	Franz Boja	PTS	8	Oct 27, 1933	Spichernsäle, Wilmersdorf, Gau Berlin, Nazi Germany	
56	Loss	30–12–14	Fred Boelck	KO	2 (10)	Oct 8, 1933	Flora Theater, Sternschanze, Gau Hamburg, Nazi Germany	
55	Draw	30–11–14	Walter Sabottke	PTS	8	Sep 1, 1933	Spichernsäle, Wilmersdorf, Gau Berlin, Nazi Germany	
54	Loss	30–11–13	Gustav Eder	KO	5 (10)	Jul 21, 1933	Bockbrauerei, Kreuzberg, Gau Berlin, Nazi Germany	
53	Win	30–10–13	Adolf Witt	PTS	12	Jun 9, 1933	Bockbrauerei, Kreuzberg, Gau Berlin, Nazi Germany	Won German light heavyweight title
52	Win	29–10–13	Otto Klockemann	TKO	2 (8)	May 26, 1933	Konzerthaus, Hanover, Gau Eastern Hanover, Nazi Germany	
51	Loss	28–10–13	Gustave Roth	PTS	10	May 16, 1933	Rubenspaleis, Antwerpen, Belgium	
50	Draw	28–9–13	Karl Eggert	PTS	8	Apr 28, 1933	Spichernsäle, Wilmersdorf, Gau Berlin, Nazi Germany	
49	Draw	28–9–12	Walter Eggert	PTS	8	Apr 21, 1933	Spichernsäle, Wilmersdorf, Gau Berlin, Nazi Germany	
48	Win	28–9–11	Johann Fraberger	TKO	9 (10)	Apr 12, 1933	Konzert-Haus, Vienna, Austria	
47	Draw	27–9–11	Hans Seifried	PTS	8	Mar 31, 1933	Neue Welt, Neukölln, Gau Berlin, Nazi Germany	
46	Win	27–9–10	Helmut Hartkopp	DQ	3 (8)	Mar 12, 1933	Flora Theater, Sternschanze, Gau Hamburg, Nazi Germany	
45	Win	26–9–10	Fred Boelck	TKO	2 (8)	Feb 26, 1933	Flora Theater, Sternschanze, Gau Hamburg, Nazi Germany	
44	Draw	25–9–10	Claude Bassin	PTS	10	Feb 3, 1933	Neue Welt, Neukölln, Gau Berlin, Nazi Germany	
43	Draw	25–9–9	Karl Ogren	PTS	8	Jan 20, 1933	Spichernsäle, Wilmdersdorf, Berlin, Germany	
42	Loss	25–9–8	Hein Domgörgen	PTS	8	Dec 27, 1932	Spichernsäle, Wilmersdorf, Berlin, Germany	
41	Loss	25–8–8	Adolf Witt	PTS	10	Dec 11, 1932	Flora Theater, Sternschanze, Hamburg, Germany	
40	Draw	25–7–8	Adolf Witt	PTS	8	Nov 27, 1932	Flora Theater, Sternschanze, Hamburg, Germany	
39	Win	25–7–7	Julian van Hoof	TKO	6 (8)	Nov 18, 1932	Kristallpalast, Magdeburg, Germany	
38	Draw	24–7–7	Hein Domgörgen	PTS	8	Nov 9, 1932	Neue Welt, Neukölln, Berlin, Germany	
37	Win	24–7–6	Josef Czichos	PTS	8	Oct 24, 1932	Ausstellungshalle, Dresden, Germany	
36	Win	23–7–6	Rienus de Boer	PTS	8	Oct 7, 1932	Spichernsäle, Wilmersdorf, Berlin, Germany	
35	Win	22–7–6	Onofrio Russo	TKO	2 (8)	Sep 15, 1932	Neue Welt, Neukölln, Berlin, Germany	
34	Win	21–7–6	Karl Ogren	PTS	8	Aug 5, 1932	Bockbrauerei, Kreuzberg, Berlin, Germany	
33	Win	20–7–6	Walter Sabottke	KO	2 (8)	Jul 19, 1932	Saalbau Friedrichshain, Berlin, Germany	
32	Loss	19–7–6	Eric Seelig	PTS	10	Jun 3, 1932	Bockbrauerei, Kreuzberg, Berlin, Germany	
31	Win	19–6–6	Adolf Witt	PTS	8	May 9, 1932	Ausstellungshalle, Dresden, Germany	
30	Win	18–6–6	Josef Czichos	PTS	6	Mar 31, 1932	Wilmersdorfer Tennishalle, Wilmersdorf, Berlin, Germany	
29	Loss	17–6–6	Hans Seifried	PTS	8	Mar 12, 1932	Spichernsäle, Wilmersdorf, Berlin, Germany	
28	Loss	17–5–6	Claude Bassin	KO	2 (8)	Mar 4, 1932	Burghaus, Hannover, Germany	
27	Win	17–4–6	Rudi Beier	TKO	6 (8)	Feb 26, 1932	Spichernsäle, Wilmersdorf, Berlin, Germany	
26	Win	16–4–6	Heinrich Buchbaum	PTS	8	Feb 5, 1932	Kasino, Bremen, Germany	
25	Draw	15–4–6	Jack Beasley	PTS	8	Jan 29, 1932	Spichernsäle, Wilmersdorf, Berlin, Germany	
24	Win	15–4–5	Franz Boja	PTS	10	Jan 15, 1932	Burghaus, Hannover, Germany	
23	Loss	14–4–5	Erich Tobeck	PTS	8	Dec 27, 1931	Spichernsäle, Wilmersdorf, Berlin, Germany	
22	Win	14–3–5	Paul Vogel	PTS	8	Dec 11, 1931	Wilmersdorfer Tennishalle, Wilmersdorf, Berlin, Germany	
21	Draw	13–3–5	Otto Hoelzl	PTS	8	Nov 20, 1931	Spichernsäle, Wilmersdorf, Berlin, Germany	
20	Loss	13–3–4	Hein Domgörgen	PTS	8	Apr 17, 1931	Neue Welt, Neukölln, Berlin, Germany	
19	Draw	13–2–4	Franz Krueppel	PTS	8	Mar 1, 1931	Stadthalle, Hagen, Germany	
18	Loss	13–2–3	Erich Tobeck	PTS	8	Feb 13, 1931	Spichernsäle, Wilmersdorf, Berlin, Germany	
17	Win	13–1–3	Paul Vogel	PTS	6	Dec 5, 1930	Sportpalast, Schöneberg, Berlin Germany	
16	Draw	12–1–3	Arie van Vliet	PTS	10	Nov 7, 1930	Etablissement Sagebiel, Neustadt, Hamburg, Germany	
15	Draw	12–1–2	Otto Hoelzl	PTS	8	Oct 10, 1930	Burghaus, Hannover, Germany	
14	Draw	12–1–1	Hein Heeser	PTS	8	Sep 19, 1930	Burghaus, Hannover, Germany	
13	Win	12–1	Emil Koska	PTS	8	Aug 29, 1930	Spichernsäle, Wilmersdorf, Berlin, Germany	
12	Win	11–1	Walter Peter	PTS	6	Jul 27, 1930	Lunapark, Halensee, Berlin, Germany	
11	Win	10–1	Paul Vogel	PTS	6	Jul 4, 1930	Bockbrauerei, Kreuzberg, Berlin, Germany	
10	Win	9–1	Franz Krueppel	PTS	8	May 23, 1930	Stadthalle, Barmen, Germany	
9	Win	8–1	Georg Gebstedt	KO	4 (8)	May 2, 1930	Burghaus, Hannover, Germany	
8	Win	7–1	Erwin Stiegler	PTS	6	Apr 12, 1930	Schuetzenhof, Bochum, Germany	
7	Win	6–1	Walter Poehnisch	PTS	8	Feb 28, 1930	Burghaus, Hannover, Germany	
6	Win	5–1	Hans Thies	TKO	5 (6)	Feb 15, 1930	Schuetzenhof, Bochum, Germany	
5	Loss	4–1	Erich Tobeck	KO	1 (6)	Jan 10, 1930	Spichernsäle, Wilmersdorf, Berlin, Germany	
4	Win	4–0	Joseph Esteve	PTS	8	Jan 5, 1930	Westfalenhalle, Dortmund, Germany	
3	Win	3–0	Paul Vogel	KO	2 (6)	Dec 27, 1929	Spichernsäle, Wilmersdorf, Berlin, Germany	
2	Win	2–0	Alex Tomkowiak	KO	1 (8)	Dec 4, 1929	Burghaus, Hannover, Germany	
1	Win	1–0	Willy Bolze	PTS	4	Oct 18, 1929	Spichernsäle, Wilmersdorf, Berlin, Germany	
