= Bewegung Nurr =

German artist collective

Bewegung Nurr is an artists' collective that operates in the fields of sculpture, installation art, graffiti, video art, photography, and painting. The collective was founded in Dresden, Germany in 1989.

== Work ==
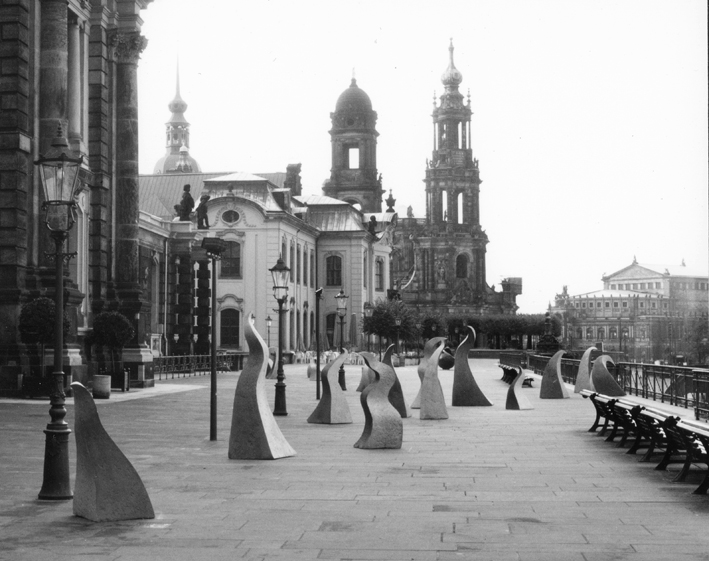
17 Strangers, Sandstone sculpture group in Dresden, 1995

The collective explores issues having to do with capitalism and media in the context of post-industrial society, and their work has been described as displaying "parodistic elegance between gravity and levity, comedy and catastrophe".

The work of the collective ranges from graffiti in Dresden Neustadt in the early 1990s to the sculpture, videos, painting, and installations of today. The strategies of subversion Bewegung Nurr employed often referenced the work of other artist groups of the '80s and '90s, such as General Idea and Die Tödliche Doris.

== Art in Public Spaces ==
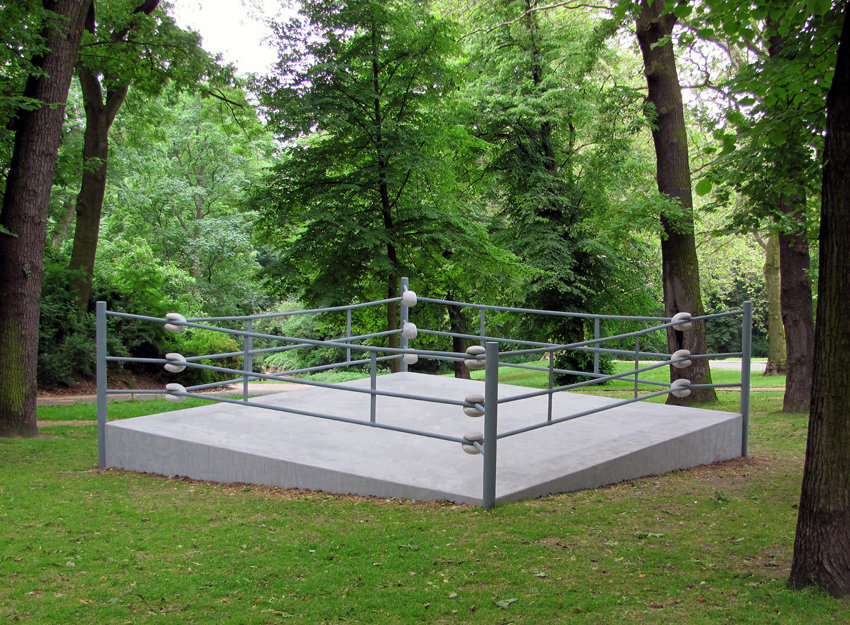
9841- Temporary memorial für Johann Rukeli Trollmann in Berlin-Kreuzberg, 2010

In 2010 and 2011, Bewegung Nurr erected a temporary memorial to the Sinto German boxing champion Johann Wilhelm Trollmann. Trollmann won the German light-heavyweight title in 1933, but was stripped of his victory by the Nazis, sterilized, arrested by the Gestapo, and finally murdered in Neuengamme concentration camp. The memorial erected by Bewegung Nurr, titled "9841", was first displayed on June 9, 2010 in Viktoriapark, Berlin—the anniversary of the day in 1933 when Trollmann won his light-heavyweight boxing title. The memorial was displayed again in Hanover in 2011 on the Ballhofplatz.

In July 2014, Bewegung Nurr created the project "Haus der 28 Türen" ("The House of the 28 Doors"), a pavilion erected on Tempelhof Field in Berlin as a memorial to refugees who lost their lives attempting to enter Europe. The structure was later moved to Oranienplatz in Berlin, where it fell victim to arson on 31 March 2015.

== Members ==
- 1989: Alekos Hofstetter, Christian Steuer, and Daniel H. Wild
- 1996 to 2008: Alekos Hofstetter, Christian Steuer, Lokiev Stoof
- since 2009: Alekos Hofstetter, Christian Steuer, and Florian Göpfert

== Literature ==
- Boris Abel (Hrsg.): BEWEGUNG NURR. Leonhardi Museum, Dresden, 2002, ISBN 3-930516-15-2.
- Peter Lang (Hrsg.): KLASSIK - Zur Geschichte der Künstlergruppe BEWEGUNG NURR 1989-2005. Revolver - Archiv für aktuelle Kunst, Frankfurt/M., 2005, ISBN 3-86588-172-6.
- Galerie Lisi Hämmerle (Hrsg.): BEWEGUNG NURR – DIE KAPITULATION. Galerie Fischer und Fischer, Berlin, 2011.
- Tanja Vonseelen (Hrsg.): 9841 - Temporäres Denkmal für Johann Trollmann. Hellerau - Europäisches Zentrum der Künste, Dresden, 2012.

== Links ==
- Web Page of the Artists' Collective Bewegung Nurr (in German)
- Kunstforum International Lexikoneintrag Bewegung Nurr (in German)
- History of the boxer Johann Trollmann
