= Bjørn Melhus =

German artist of Norwegian ancestry (born 1966)

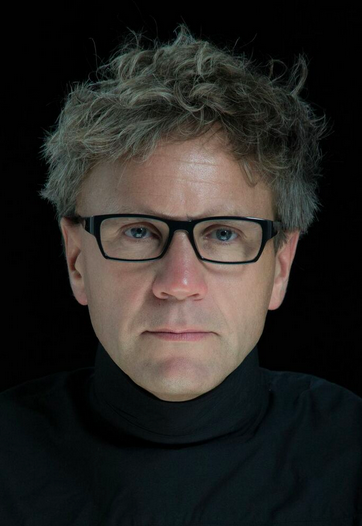
Artist Bjørn Melhus Born 1966 in Kirchheim / Teck

Bjørn Melhus is a German artist of Norwegian ancestry known for experimental short films, videos and installations.

== Education ==
Bjørn Melhus studied photography at the Adolf-Lazi-Schule in Stuttgart German from 1985 to 1987. After completing his technical education, Melhus went on to study film and video at HBK Braunschweig School of Arts, Braunschweig Germany from 1990 until graduating in 1997. During his time in Braunschweig, Melhus took part in the European Media Artist in Residence Exchange through the EMARE-Program in Budapest, Hungary (1996). After completing his education Melhus went on to additional residency programs at the California Institute of the Arts, Los Angeles through a DAAD Fellowship (1997–1998), Prize of the Art Association, Hanover (2000), the International Studio & Curatorial Program, ISCP, New York (2001–2002), the Kyoto Art Center, Japan (2005), Civitella Ranieri, Italy (2006) and Goethe Institute Mexico City (2009).

== Work ==
In his works Bjørn Melhus focuses on general global ideas and themes and the direct effects they have on people. Many works find their inspiration from the tension between freedom and violence or repression. Melhus uses footage from film, video and television excessively and deconstructs stereotypical themes, figures and patterns of perception through means of exaggeration. At the same time, he breaks up a seemingly fixed relationship between media and audience, thus opening up the view on the essentials of human interaction. In his work he has developed a singular position, expanding the possibilities for a critical reception of cinema and television. His practice of fragmentation, destruction, and reconstitution of well-known figures, topics, and strategies of the mass media opens up not only a network of new interpretations and critical commentaries, but also defines the relationship of mass media and viewer anew. Melhus embodies all roles by himself as if he reflects "our character as something forced upon us by external relations of media and power, regardless of who we are".

Originally rooted in an experimental film context, Melhus's work has been shown and awarded at numerous international film festivals. He has held screenings at Tate Modern and the LUX in London, the Museum of Modern Art (MediaScope) in New York, and the Centre Pompidou in Paris, amongst others. His work has been exhibited in shows like The American Effect at the Whitney Museum New York, the 8th International Istanbul Biennial, solo and group shows at FACT Liverpool, Serpentine Galleries London, Sprengel Museum Hanover, Museum Ludwig Cologne, ZKM Karlsruhe, Denver Art Museum among others.

Since 2003, Bjørn Melhus has been a professor for Fine Arts and Virtual Realities at the Kunsthochschule Kassel, Germany.

Bjørn Melhus has been living and working in Berlin since 1987.

== Videos/installations (selection) ==
- 1986 TOAST/ CORNFLAKES
- 1990 AMERICA SELLS
- 1991 DAS ZAUBERGLAS (THE MAGIC GLASS)
- 1991 ICH WEISS NICHT, WER DAS IST (I DON'T KNOW WHO THAT IS)
- 1993 JETZT (NOW)
- 1993 REINIGUNGSKASSETTE (CLEANING TAPE)
- 1995 WEIT WEIT WEG (FAR FAR AWAY)
- 1997 BLUE MOON (video/ installation)
- 1997 NO SUNSHINE
- 1997 OUT OF THE BLUE
- 1998 ARRIVAL DEPARTURE – DEPARTURE ARRIVAL
- 1998 AGAIN AND AGAIN
- 1999 SILVERCITY 1+2
- 2000 GOOD MORNING NEW WORLD
- 2001 WEEPING
- 2001 PRIMETIME
- 2001 THE ORAL THING
- 2002 SOMETIMES (FIRE IN ZERO GRAVITY)
- 2002 DIE UMGEKEHRTE RÜSTUNG (THE INVERSED ARMORY)
- 2003 AUTO CENTER DRIVE
- 2003 I'M YOUR TV
- 2003 STILL MEN OUT THERE
- 2003 FIGHTING THE FORCES OF EVIL
- 2004 HAPPY REBIRTH
- 2005 CAPTAIN
- 2005 BEHIND THE MOON, BEYOND THE RAIN
- 2005 EASTERN WESTERN PARK
- 2007 EMOTION FIELD #1
- 2007 POLICIA
- 2007 THE CASTLE
- 2007 99 FLOORS
- 2007 THE MEADOW
- 2007 THE CITY
- 2008 Murphy
- 2008 DEADLY STORMS
- 2008 I-MAN U-MAN
- 2008 SCREENSAVERS
- 2008 DEADLY STORMS 333
- 2008 OMEN
- 2009 CRITICAL SYSTEM ALERT
- 2009 SCENERY MARS
- 2009 SLOGAN SERIES
- 2009 RANDOM SUPERHEROES
- 2009 MARS RECOVERY
- 2009 BEAGLE III
- 2009 HECHO EN MEXICO
- 2009 TREEHOUSE #1, #2 & #3
- 2010 CENTER OF THE WORLD
- 2010 AFTERLIFE
- 2010 NIGHTWATCH | NACHTWACHE
- 2011 I'm Not the Enemy
- 2010 I DO NOT BELONG IN THIS HOUSE
- 2010 THIS IS MY HOME
- 2011 DAS BADEZIMMER
- 2011 99 EUROS
- 2012 SUDDEN DESTRUCTION
- 2013 HAUSER
- 2013 HEAVEN
- 2013 LIBERTY PARK
- 2014 HEADHUNTER
- 2014 MAESTRA
- 2014 FREEDOM & INDEPENDENCE
- 2015 THE THEORY OF FREEDOM

== Awards ==
- 1992 Young artist award, Videofest Berlin
- 1992 Special Video Art Award, Marl
- 1992 Video Art Award, Bremen
- 1994 Kubo-Award, Bremen
- 1998 Video Art Award, Marl, Germany
- 1998 Prix Elida -Fabergé, Munich, Germany
- 1998 2nd Award, Transmediale Berlin
- 1998 Prize of the German Filmcritics, EMAF, Osnabrück, Germany
- 1998 NEW VISIONS VIDEO 1998, Long Beach Museum of Art, (Production Grant)
- 1998 Certificate of Merit, San Francisco International Film Festival
- 1998 Förderpreis Film des Landes Niedersachsen, Germany
- 2000 Honor "The special show" by the International Art Critics Association, Museum Schloß Hardenberg, Velbert
- 2001 Prize of the Sprengel Museum, Hannover
- 2002 Special Mention Video Award, Marl, Germany
- 2003 HAP-Grieshaber-Preis der VG Bild Kunst, Bonn, Germany
- 2003 German Competition, 49. International Shortfilfmfestival Oberhausen, Germany
- 2009 Award of the Cinema Jury, 55th International Shortfilmfestival, Oberhausen, Germany
- 2011 German Shortfilm Award (Experimental film)
- 2011 Special Mention, International Shortfilmfestival, Oberhausen, Germany
- 2011 Special Mention, International Shortfilmfestival, Hamburg, Germany
- 2011 Special Mention, Bucharest International Experimental Film Festival - BIEFF, Romania
- 2013 Nominated for German Shortfilm Award
- 2015 German Shortfilm Award (Experimental film)
- 2015 Sphinx Award, International Video Festival VIDEOMEDEJA, Novi Sad, Serbia
