= Børre Sæthre =

Norwegian artist (born 1967)

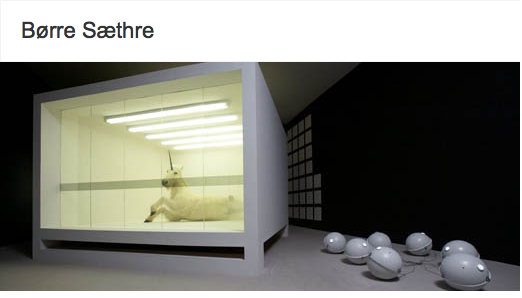
P.S.1 Contemporary Art Center, 5 February 2009

Børre Sæthre (b. 1967 in Oslo, Norway) is a Norwegian artist whose exhibitions combine many skills, including those of the architect, the interior designer and the set dresser. His installations comprise interconnected environments that take the visitor into a fantastic, dreamlike universe which is both aesthetically pleasing and psychologically disquieting.

In 1996, he launched LUSTLUX, under which his spatial environments (incorporating walls, furniture, light, sound, and different props) are produced.

In the past, Sæthre has spoken of his fascination with Freud's concept of "the uncanny". So instead of trying to shock his media-saturated audience, he draws visitors into active participation in his synthetic dreamlike worlds and gives them a true taste of the uncanny.

Sæthre lives and works in Berlin and Oslo. He is represented by Galerie Loevenbruck, Paris, France

== Academic ==
His academic career has been:

- 2008 Residency at Cité internationale des arts in Paris
- 2001–2002: Residency at the Kunstlerhaus Bethanien, Berlin, Germany
- 1999–2000: Residency at the ISCP (International Studio and Curatorial Program), New York, USA
- 1997–1998: Master Studio, National Academy of Fine Arts, Oslo, Norway
- 1992–1996: National Academy of Fine Arts, Oslo, Norway

== Solo exhibitions ==
- 1997 - Double Fantasy The Pasolini Experience and some Paranormal Activities, Künstlerhaus Bethanien, Berlin
- 1997 - The Beautiful Ones Hurt You Every Time, Fotogalleriet, Oslo, Norway
- 1997 - The Steps in Between, Hordaland Kunstnersentrum, Bergen, Norway
- 1997 - (09-09 / 14-10) - Lustlux, Lustlux Corp, Oslo
- 1999 - A million dreams, a million scars, Galerie Wang, Oslo
- 2000 - (09-09 / 12-10) - Module for Mood, Theard Waxing Space, New York City
- 2001 - (31-03 / 24-06) - My Private Sky, Astrup Fearnley Museum of Modern Art, Oslo
- 2003 - Catch Me and Let Me Die Wonderful, Quarantine Series, Amsterdam, Netherlands
- 2003 - The Lustlux Years - Galerie Wang, Oslo, Norway
- 2003 - Untitled 5.0' (Selected Memories: Fragments, Sketches and Ideas From the Lustlux-years), Lydmar hotel, Stockholm, Sweden
- 2005 - (10-11 / 14-01) - Powered by zero (The end of the BAMBI cycle) - Galerie Loevenbruck, Paris
- 2005 - (23-11 / 15-01) - Autonomic High (the things I can't control, no matter how I try) - FRAC Caen, Lower Normandy
- 2006 - (11-09 / 15-10) - I've been guilty of hanging around - Participant Inc, New York
- 2007 - (25-05 / 19-08) - For Someone Who Nearly Died But Survived - Bergen Kunsthall, Bergen, Norway
- 2008 - (01-01 / 25-05) - Kunsthallen Brandts Klædefabrik, Odense, Denmark
- 2008 - Opening October 19 - P.S.1 Contemporary Art Center, New York, USA
- 2009 - (07-05 / 20/06) - All Passion Spent (Death and Dark Forests) - Galerie Loevenbruck, Paris
- 2010 - (19/06 / 26/06) - 2010 N.N (Nothing left // ) - Galleri NordNorge, Harstad, Norway
