= Christian Falsnaes =

Danish artist

Christian Falsnaes (born 1980) is a Danish artist living and working in Berlin, Germany.

== Education ==
Falsnaes studied philosophy in Copenhagen from 2001 to 2003. After a short stay in Zurich, he went to Vienna and studied from 2005 to 2011 at the Academy of Fine Arts under Daniel Richter, Peter Kogler and Constanze Ruhm.

== Career ==
Before his art studies, Falsnaes made performances and interactions in the public space using his background as a graffiti painter. Since 2009, he has developed performances based on a pre-written script. In the beginning, he played a central role in motivating the public to actively participate in the action. "Through the active involvement, the viewer should cross personal boundaries, overcome them and feel the moment of liberation and change. [1] Falsnaes said in an interview [2]: "When I involve the viewer in the process of art production, it is also about sharing all of this, instead of showing the result of my private artistic process."

The study of authority, hierarchies, social and, above all, pop-cultural rituals is an integral part of his art.

"Working with the structure of power, or with group dynamics, is in itself political. It is not so much about people following or responding in a certain way, but about making the audience aware of how certain rituals affect them. "Christian Falsnaes [3]

In his more recent work Falsnaes withdrew physically from the actions. The instructions to the audience are now provided by means of headphones, loudspeakers, or by employed "instructors". [4] Often, his performances are performed as "female versions", in which the earlier role of Falsnaes is taken over by a female performer. He often mixes himself among the audience and participates as a spectator. Through this withdrawal an additional authority transfer takes place, involving the public even more in his art. [5] Many performances are documented in video recordings and the main part of these recordings have been well planned out in advance and live on as independent video works. There are, however, also works of art arising from the actions, such as canvases painted by the audience according to the artist's instructions. [6] This includes "surface memory" where a freshly painted canvas is smeared onto the walls in a public space leaving behind an abstract wall work as well as an altered canvas.

== Exhibitions ==
=== Solo exhibitions (selection) ===
- 2016: Front, Yarat Contemporary Art Space, Baku
- 2016:Thousand Faces, Statens Museum for Kunst, Copenhagen
- 2016: First, 1646, The Hague
- 2016: Many, Juan & Patricia Vergez Collection, Buenos Aires
- 2016: Available, Kunstverein Braunschweig
- 2015: Front (Kareth Schaffer), KIOSK, Gent
- 2015:The title is your name, Bielefelder Kunstverein, Bielefeld
- 2015: Available, Kunstverein Braunschweig, Braunschweig
- 2014: Performance Works, PSM, Berlin
- 2014: Art Basel Statements, Art Basel, Basel
- 2013: Formations of bodies - Opening, KW Institute of Contemporary Art, Berlin
- 2013:One, DREI, Cologne
- 2011: ELIXIR, PSM, Berlin
- 2011: Existing Things, OSLO10, Basel
- 2011: Fulfilling Your Expectations, Rohde Contemporary, Copenhagen
- 2010:There and Back, Skånes Konstförening, Malmö, Sweden
- 2008:Rational Animal, Niederösterreiches Museum, Vienna

=== Group exhibitions (selection) ===
- 2016: Conditions of Political Choreography, CCA, Tel Aviv
- 2016:20 Years, Migros Museum für Gegenwartskunst, Zurich
- 2016:The gestural, 21'er Haus, Vienna
- 2016: Head to Head, Castlefield Gallery, Manchester
- 2016: Today's Art Festival, The Hague
- 2016: Take Up Your Space, KAI10 / Arthena Foundation, Düsseldorf
- 2016: Manifesta 11, Zurich
- 2016: Im Raum mit, BNKR, Munich
- 2016: Stellung nehmen, Kestnergesellschaft, Hannover
- 2015:Preis der Nationalgalerie, Hamburger Bahnhof, Berlin
- 2015: Extension du domaine du jeu, Centre Pompidou, Paris
- 2015: The city is the star, ZKM | Zentrum für Kunst und Medientechnologie Karlsruhe
- 2015: Destination Wien, Kunsthalle Wien, Vienna
- 2015: History is a warm gun, n.b.k. Neuer Berliner Kunstverein, Berlin
- 2015: Life in a Castle. Works from the Collection, Musée départemental d'art contemporain de Rochechouart
- 2015: European Media Art Festival, Kunsthalle Osnabrück
- 2015: More Konzeption conception now, Museum Morsbroich, Leverkusen
- 2015: The Lulennial - a slight gestuary, Lulu, Mexico City
- 2015: 30 + 30 retro/ perspektiv, Museum für Neue Kunst, Freiburg
- 2014:Reykjavik Dance Festival, Reykjavik Art Museum, Reykjavik
- 2014: Public, Art Basel / Miami Beach
- 2014: Performance proletarians, MAGASIN - Centre National d’art Contemporain de Grenoble
- 2014: Vertigo of reality, Akademie der Künste, Berlin
- 2014: Vor Ort, Bielefelder Kunstverein, Bielefeld
- 2014: Maldives Exodus Caravan Show, Te Tuhi Centre for the Arts, New Zealand
- 2014: Is it Y(ours)?, Museum Bärengasse, Zurich
- 2014: Now and again – Performance for video, Fotografisk Center, Copenhagen
- 2013: Ihre Geschichte(n), Bonner Kunstverein, Bonn
- 2013: Gelatin - Stop - Anna Ly Sing - Stop, Schinkel Pavilion, Berlin
- 2013: Maldives Exodus Caravan Show, Serra dei Giardini, Venice
- 2013: Grundfrage (Question Fondamentale), Crac Alsace, Altkirch
- 2013: Regionalismus, Salzburger Kunstverein, Salzburg
- 2013: Enten/Eller, Nikolaj Contemporary Art Centre, Copenhagen
- 2013: Entweder/oder, Haus am Waldsee, Berlin

=== Awards ===
- 2017: Future Generation Art Prize (shortlist)
- 2015: Preis der Nationalgalerie (shortlist)
- 2015: Prix K-Way Per4m
- 2008: H13 Prize for Performance
- 2008: International Prize for Performance (shortlist)

=== Press ===
- 2016: АРТ-ТЕРАПИЯ, Баку Журнал, Baku Magazine
- 2016: Christian Falsnaes, Artist's Favorites, Spike Art Quarterly
- 2016: Christa Sigg, Der Animateur, ART Das Kunstmagazin
- 2016: Arielle Bier, The Audience is Present, SEEK magazine
- 2016: Raimar Stange, Das direkte Verhältnis von Kunst und Publikum, Kunstforum
- 2016: Sofie Crabbe, Move!, Metropolis M
- 2016: Raimar Stange, Gegen die Angst, Polar Zeitschrift für Kultur
- 2015: Annika Reith, Ohne dich gibt es kein Werk, Spex
- 2015: Marcus Woeller, Kontrollierte Gruppendynamik, Die Welt
- 2015: Camilla Stockmann, Jeg vil nedbryde afstanden, Politiken
- 2015: Kito Nedo, Christian Falsnaes, Art Das Kunstmagazin
- 2015: Sabrina Schleichler, Am Puls der Zeit, Kunstzeitung
- 2015: Ingeborg Wiensowski, Übernehmen sie die Kontrolle!, Kultur SPIEGEL
- 2015: Noemi Smolik, Focus: Christian Falsnaes, Frieze
- 2015: Peter Funken, Schwindel der Wirklichkeit, Kunstforum
- 2015: Raimar Stange, Angst und Konfliktbereit(et), Kunstforum
- 2015: Jahresrückblick - Kunstwerk des Jahres, Monopol
- 2015: Raimar Stange, Christian Falsnaes - Performance Works, ArtReview
- 2014: Angela Hohmann, Papier muss brennen, Tagesspiegel
- 2014: Eva Scharrer, Sie verlassen jetzt die Komfortzone!, artmagazine.cc
- 2014: Lotte Løvholm, Rub your body against a stranger, Kopenhagen.dk
- 2014: Josie Thaddeus-Johns, The audience is my material: Christian Falsnaes, Sleek Magazine
- 2014: Julia Halperin, Performance: Do you buy it?, The art newspaper
- 2014: Marcus Woeller, Und Abends mit die Skulpturen nach Hause gehen, Die Welt
- 2014: Boris Pofalla, Watchlist: Christian Falsnaes, Monopol
- 2014: Noemi Smolik, Christian Falsnaes - One (review), Artforum
- 2014: Raimar Stange, Highlights: Christian Falsnaes, Kaleidoscope
- 2014: Fanny Gonella, Social construction - Conversation with Christian Falsnaes, Dust Magazine
- 2014: Raimar Stange, On art and theatricality in Berlin, ArtReview
- 2014: Maike Müller, Abgewetzt durch Zeit und Pragmatismus (review), Monopol online
- 2013: Sabrina Schleicher, Singen, Summen, Tanzen, Kunstzeitung
- 2013: Raimar Stange, Yes we can! Zur Kraft politischer Performances, artist Kunstmagazin
- 2013: Anne Kohlik, Das Vermächtnis der Frauen im Kunstbetrieb, Frankfurter Allgemeine Zeitung
- 2013: Almuth Spiegler, Starter: Christian Falsnaes, ART - Das Kunstmagazin
- 2012: Love and security (Artist feature), Tissue Magazine
- 2012: Kulturpalast, ZDF Kultur
- 2012: Carson Chan, Express yourself - Portrait: Christian Falsnaes, Spike Art Quarterly
- 2012: John Beeson, Performance and authority (review), Spike Art Quarterly

=== Catalogues ===
- Christian Falsnaes - ELIXIR, Distanz
- How to frame - On the Threshold of Performing and Visual Arts, Sternberg Press
- History is a Warm Gun, n.b.k., Berlin, Verlag Walther König
- Vertigo of Reality, ex.cat., Verlag Walther König
- The Lulennial: A Slight Gestuary, ex.cat, Mousse Publishing
- 30/30 retro/perspektiv, ex.cat. Museum für Neue Kunst Freiburg, 2015
- More Konzeption Conception now, ex.cat, Kettler Verlag, 2015
- One, ex.cat, DREI, Cologne
- Søren Kierkegaard Entweder/oder, ex.cat., Verlag Walther König, 2013
- H13 Preis für Performance 2007 - 2012, Kunstraum Niederösterreich, 2013
- Increasingly colourful – Current Painting from Austria, ex.cat., Kerber Verlag, 2012
- Regionale12, ex.cat, Regionale, 2012
- Modes of Address, ex.cat., Salzburger Kunstverein, 2012
- A good reason is one that looks like one, Message Salon, Zürich, 2012
- The present author – Who speaks in Performance?, Revolver Publishing, 2011
- PerformIC 2010, ex.cat/DVD, Innsbruck Contemporary, 2010
