= Amy Cheung (artist) =

Hong Kong artist

Amy Wan Man Cheung (Chinese: 張韻雯) is a Hong Kong conceptual artist. Her works cover a wide range of mediums including photography, durational performances, robotic sculptures, installations, wearables, landscape and architectural design, and VR short films. Cheung currently lives and works in New York, the United States.

== Biography ==
Cheung graduated with a B.A. in Fine Art & History of Art from Goldsmiths, University of London and an M.F.A. from the Slade School of Fine Art at the University of London. Since 1997, she has initiated a number of city interventions and public art projects in Hong Kong, and exhibited in over 40 exhibitions locally and abroad. She previously taught forensic architecture in the Department of Architecture at the University of Hong Kong, and held creative workshops in the Department of Fine Art at the Chinese University of Hong Kong. Cheung was Beck's New Contemporaries in the U.K. and UNESCO-Aschberg Laureate awarded by UNESCO's International Fund for the Promotion of Culture in 2004, and subsequently represented Hong Kong in the 2007 Venice Biennale. She received the Outstanding Young Artist Award (Visual Arts) from the Hong Kong Arts Development Council and the Lee Hysan Foundation Fellowship from the Asian Cultural Council.

Cheung founded Handkerchief Production with Finnish video artist Erkka Nissinen in 2008, a creative studio experimenting with visual art and multimedia design. Its fashion label 'handkerchief' made a debut with their SS11 collection 'Lost Queen in Metropolis', which combines art, film, and fashion. The label's FW11 collection was a commissioned project to pay tribute to Hong Kong filmmaker John Woo, who received the Golden Lion Life Achievement Award at the 67th Venice Film Festival in 2010. The collection took inspiration from Cheung's robotic installation Face Machine.

== Selected works ==
=== Hankie Bank: Boundaries are of Equal Length (2014) ===
In her performance piece, Cheung transformed an under-utilised Citibank branch into an immersive theatre and participatory stock exchange, and then concluded the performance with a finale sales event, in which the exhibited works were all available for purchase. With this project, Cheung repurposed an abandoned financial establishment to a site for art, fashion, and business. The site was also used as the venue of the showcase of the artist's fashion brand handkerchief's SS15 collection 'Square Paintings'.

=== <imagine.heroes> (2013) ===
In 2013, Cheung collaborated with psychologist Philip Zimbardo, the creator of the Stanford Prison Experiment, in a documentation project called <imagine.heroes>. They went inside a fMRI scanner for four minutes—Cheung thought about a Chinese hero and Zimbardo an American hero, then they both imagined a Platonic Hero. Both of their brainwaves were captured and engraved into a triptych, which was subsequently painted in their own blood.

=== Down the Rabbit Hole, 'TAXI!' says Alice (2004) ===
In 2004, Cheung placed a lopsided sculpture of Hong Kong's iconic red taxi in the parking lot of the Chinese University of Hong Kong, by the taxi queue in Pedder Street in Central, and subsequently in many more public locations around the city and in Guangzhou. The taxi sculpture is part of the narrative of Cheung's adaption of Lewis Carroll's Alice's Adventures in Wonderland, in which the artist herself followed Alice down the rabbit hole and was taken aback by the unexpected action Alice did—calling for a taxi after crying in a pool of tears—contrary to what is written in the novel. Characterised by artistic intervention to challenge public perceptions of reality, Cheung presents an oscillation between fantasy and reality. The taxi sculpture is now part of the collection of M+.

=== 72 hours sound & vision. Made in Hong Kong (30/6/1997–2/7/1997) (1997) ===
Cheung blindfolded herself for three days and relied on audio-visual descriptions provided by 72 individuals to experience Hong Kong's political transition in her debut work. As requested by the artist, each of the participants took photographs with 35mm slide film and made a one-hour sound recording of a subject of their choosing before, during, and after the day which marks the transfer of sovereignty over Hong Kong from the United Kingdom to the People's Republic of China. In response to the sociopolitical climate of Hong Kong, Cheung creates a documentation of 72 personal experience during a historical moment, reminding individuals of their right to remember how they truly felt about the event and their new identity.

== Selected exhibitions ==
=== Solo exhibitions ===
- Hankie Bank: Boundaries are of Equal Length, Hankie Bank, New York, USA (2015)
- Atom Ocean: Once we are dead, we don't have to worry about dying anymore—Exhibition by Amy Cheung, Shatin City Hall, Hong Kong and Stanley Square, Hong Kong (2006)
- Blue, Indefinitive Portraiture and the Betweens, Gertrude Contemporary, Melbourne, Australia (2004)

=== Group exhibitions ===
- Tale of the Wonderland, Blindspot Gallery, Wong Chuk Hang, Hong Kong (2017)
- If Hong Kong, A Woman / Traveller and Schema: A Traveller's Approach, 1a Space, Hong Kong (2015)
- Hong Kong Eye 2012, Saatchi Gallery, London, United Kingdom (2012–2013)
- Camouflage: Visual Art and Design in Disguise, Museum of Contemporary Art Kiasma, Helsinki, Finland (2012)
- Open Studios, International Studio & Curatorial Program, Williamsburg, New York, USA (2011)
- Star Fairy, Hong Kong in Venice, 52th International Art Exhibition - La Biennale di Venezia, Italy (2007)
- In awhile the crocodile, Marseille en Juin, France (1999)
- Misled, Institute of Contemporary Art, London, United Kingdom (1999)
- Cities on the Move, Museum of Contemporary Art Kiasma, Helsinki, Finland (1999)
- Freelance Gallery Tram, City Festival, Hong Kong (1999)
- Slurps!, Forum Box Gallery, Helsinki, Finland (1999)
- Basketball, Hiding Behind the Sofa, Perma Art Centre, Gloucester, England (1997)
- Frozen dislocated shocket plug-ged away home precise warmth, newcontemporaries, Camden Art Center, London, United Kingdom (1997)
- 72 hours sound & vision. Made in Hong Kong (30/6/1997–2/7/1997), Media. Art. Project., Amos Anderson Museum, Helsinki, Finland (1997)
