= Jeremy Shaw =

Canadian visual and performance artist

Jeremy Shaw (born 1977) is a Canadian visual artist based in Berlin, Germany.

Shaw's art deals with altered states and the cultural and scientific practices investigating transcendental experience, with recurring themes around belief-systems, drugs, neuroscience, subculture, dance and evolution. His works often combine elements of cinema vérité, conceptual art, music video, scientific research, and science fiction. His practice incorporates media including film, video, photography, sculpture, music and performance.

== Exhibitions ==
Shaw's solo exhibitions have been hosted by the Centre Georges Pompidou, Paris; Schinkel Pavillon, Berlin; and MoMA PS1, New York; and he has participated in international surveys, including the 16th Lyon Biennale in 2022, 57th Venice Biennale in 2017, and Manifesta 11, Zurich, Switzerland in 2016.

In 2016 Shaw was awarded the Sobey Art Award.

Shaw's work is included in numerous permanent collections including the Museum of Modern Art, New York, United States, Tate Modern, London, UK, Centre Pompidou, Paris, France, National Gallery of Canada, Ottawa, Canada, and Kunst- und Ausstellungshalle der Bundesrepublik Deutschland, Bonn, Germany.

=== Solo exhibitions (selection) ===
- Phase Shifting Index, Centre Georges Pompidou, Paris
- Quantification Trilogy, Julia Stoschek Foundation, Berlin and Düsseldorf, Germany
- Liminals, Museé des beaux arts de Montreal, Canada
- Quantification Trilogy, Kunstverein Hamburg, Hamburg
- Medium-Bused Time, Contemporary Art Gallery, Vancouver, Canada
- Variation FQ, Schinkel Pavillon, Berlin, Germany
- Best Minds, MoMA PS1, New York, USA

=== Group exhibitions (selection) ===
- Vertigo, ARoS Aarhus Kunstmuseum, Denmark
- On the spiritual matter of art, Maxxi, Rome, Italy
- Blind Faith: Between the Visceral and the Cognitive in Contemporary Art, Haus de Kunst, Munich
- 57th Venice Biennale, Venice, Italy
- How To Live Together, Kunsthalle Wien, Vienna, Austria
- Manifesta 11, Zurich, Switzerland
- Witte de With Center for Contemporary Art, Rotterdam, The Netherlands
- Irish Museum of Modern Art, Dublin, Ireland (2015)
- Shine a Light, National Gallery of Canada, Ottawa, Canada
- MOTION, Stedelijk Museum, Amsterdam, the Netherlands
- One On One, Kunst-Werke Institute for Contemporary Art, Berlin, Germany
