= Leeza Ahmady =

Afghan curator and educator

- Born: 1972 (age 53–54); Kabul, Afghanistan
- Education: Budapest University; Hunter College; St. John's University; Pratt Institute
- Occupations: Curator, arts administrator, author, dance instructor, educator

Leeza Ahmady (born 1972) is an Afghan-born American independent curator, author, arts administrator, dance instructor, and educator; she is known for her work within the genre of Central Asian art. She is the founder of AhmadyArts and Director of Asia Contemporary Art Week (ACAW) since 2006. Ahmady has organized large-scale festivals, exhibitions, artistic collaborations, and experimental forums revolving around contemporary art practices from across all regions of Asia. Ahmady is New York based and was born and raised in Kabul, Afghanistan.

== Biography ==
Leeza Ahmady was born in Kabul, Afghanistan. As a teenager, she moved to New York.

She received her BA degree from St. John's University (1994) in international relations. In her junior year, she attended Budapest University as part of a study abroad program. She later studied art history at Hunter College (from 2001 to 2003) as a graduate level non-degree student. She received her MA degree from Pratt Institute (2005) in Arts and Cultural Management with her final thesis concentrating on the development and practice of contemporary art in Central Asia.

== Career ==
From 2005 to 2013, Ahmady had an ongoing curation project, "The Taste of Other: Contemporary Art in Central Asia", which presented artists of Afghanistan, Kyrgyzstan, Tajikistan, Kazakhstan and Uzbekistan in various exhibitions and talks.

Since 2006, Ahmady has directed Asia Contemporary Art Week (ACAW), which works in partnership with various international art institutions to further dialogue about Central Asian art. Field meeting has been a signature forum of ACAW since 2014, bringing together artists and curators to engage in dialogue together on provided topics. In 2015, Holland Cotter and Roberta Smith co-chief art critics for The New York Times voted the number 9 of the top 10 best art events of the year, "Sonic Blossom "by Lee Mingwei a performance series presented by Asia Contemporary Art Week and Metropolitan Museum of Art.

Ahmady is a founding member of two non-profit organizations: NURTURArt Non Profit, and School of Hope.

== Past curatorial ==
- FX Harsono: The Chronicles of Resilience (2016), presented at Tyler Rollins Fine Art, New York
- Arahmaiani: Fertility of the Mind (2014), performance work survey by Indonesia artist Arahmaiani, presented at Tyler Rollins Fine Art
- No-Mad-Ness in No Man's Land (2013), presented at ESLITE Gallery in Taipei; co-curated with Ombretta Agro Andruff
- History of Histories: Afghan Films, 1960–Present (2013), presented as part of No Country: Regarding South and Southeast Asia exhibition in Solomon R. Guggenheim Museum, and Wattis Institute for Contemporary Arts, San Francisco.
- In Residence: Season of Cambodia Festival (2012–2013): Presented in MoMA Museum of Modern Art, The Met Museum, Bronx Museum, BAM, Creative Time, Residency Unlimited, Lower Manhattan Arts Council, Parsons The New School, Columbia University & Independent Curators International.
- Dialogues in Contemporary Art (2012–2014), presented at Independent Curators International with ARTonAIR.org.
- Documenta (13) (2010 – 2012), agent and curatorial team member, Kassel Germany/ Kabul Afghanistan exhibitions and seminars.
- Tarjama / Translation: Contemporary Art from Middle East, Central Asia and its Diasporas (2008–2010), commissioned by ArteEast, held at Queens Museum of Art in (2009), and traveled to Johnson Museum of Art, Cornell University (2010). Presented artists included Yto Barrada, Emily Jacir, Gülsün Karamustafa, Bouchra Khalili, Farhad Moshiri, Michael Rakowitz, Khalil Rabah, Wael Shawky, Mitra Tabrizian, and Akram Zaatari and many more.
- Truly Truthful - Art Asia Fair Miami (2009), participating artists: Lara Baladi, Huma Bhabha, Jeff Cylkowski, Anita Dube, Cao Fei, Chitra Ganesh, Yeondoo Jung, Gulnara Kasmalieva and Muratbek Djumaliev, Li Jikai, Kimsooja, Mami Kosemura, Marya Kazoun, Sopheap Pich, Qiu Zhijie, Jean Shin, Ushio Shinohara, Jakkai Siributr, Sislej Xhafa.
- Afghanistan: Hidden Treasures from the National Museum, Kabul Film Series (2008) National Gallery of Art, Washington, D.C.; a selection of video works by Afghan and Afghan-American artists, including Mariam Ghani, Roya Ghiasy, and Rahraw Omarzad.
- The Silk Code (2008), Asia Society, Astana, Kazakhstan; participating artists: Vyacheslav Akhunov, Said Atabekov, Mariam Ghani, Gulnara Kasmalieva & Muratbek Djumalieva, Rustam Khalfin, Jamshed Kholikov, Galim Madanov, Almagul Menlibayeva, Moldagul Narymbetov, Saken Narynov, Rahraw Omarzad, Alexander Ugay, Yelena and Viktor Vorobayeva.
- I Dream of the Stans (2008), Winkleman Gallery, New York, and travelled to Museo de Arte de El Salvador (Museo MARTE) (2008); presented artists: Vyacheslav Akhunov, Rahraw Omarzad, Almagul Menlibayeva, Jamshed Khalilov, Gulnara Kasmalieva and Muratbek Djumaliev, Said Atabekov, and Julia Tikhonova and Rustam Khalfin.
- Parable of the Garden: New Media Art from Iran & Central Asia (2008), The College of New Jersey Art Gallery, co-curated with Sarah Cunningham and Deborah Hutton; featured artists: Vyacheslav Akhunov, Muratbek Djoumaliev and Gulnara Kasmalieva, Shahram Entekhabi, Simin Keramati, Khosro Khosravi, Erbossyn Meldibekov, Almagul Menlibayeva, Rahraw Omarzad, Center for Contemporary Art Afghanistan, Karan Reshad, Kolah Studio, Alexander Ugay.
- The Paradox of Polarity: Contemporary Art from Central Asia (2007), Bose Pacia; artists included: Vyaxheslav Akhunov, Said Atabekov, Rustam Khalfin, Shailo Djekshenbayev, Murat Djoumaliev, Ulan Japarov, Gulnara Kasamalieva, Erbossyn Meldubekov, Almagul Menlibayeva, Roman Maskalev, Saken Narynov, Talant Ogobaev, Elena and Victor Vorobaeva, Julia Tikhonova.
- Afghanistan and Central Asia Pavilions (2005) the 51st Venice Biennale; artists in Afghanistan Pavilion: Lida Abdul and Rahim Walidzada. Artists in Central Asian Pavilion: Vyacheslav Akhunov, Said Atabekov, Maxim Boronilov, Muratbek Djumaliev, Gulnara Kasmalieva, Rustam Khalfin, Sergey Maslov, Roman Maskalev, Almagul Menlibayeva, Erbossyn Meldibekov, Alexander Nikolaev, Julia Tikhonova, Sergey Tychina, Yelena Vorobyeva, Viktor Vorobyev. Performance and art events video archives compiled by: Valeria Ibraeva and Roman Arefiev (Almaty, Kazakhstan) Ulan Japarov, Bishkek (Kyrgyzstan) Vyacheslav Akhunov and Alexander Nikolaev (Uzbekistan) plus Issyk-Kul Art Symposia. 2001–2002. Film by Shaarbek Amankul, Bishkek (Kyrgyzstan).
- The Taste of Others: Art in Central Asia (2005), Apexart, New York; video program with works by Lida Abdul, Roya Ghiasy, Mariam Ghani, Nikhil Chopra, Yerbossyn Meldibekov, Alexander, Jacob Fuglsang Mikklesen, Sislej Xhafa, Muratbek Jumaliev and Gulnara Kasmalieva.

== Publications ==
- Ahmady, Leeza; Akhunov, Vyacheslav (2012). Vyacheslav Akhunov. dOCUMENTA (13): 100 Notizen. Vol. 60. Hatje Cantz. pp. 5–7. ISBN 9783775729093.
- Ahmady, Leeza (September 9, 2012). "Dear Rustam Khalfin". Manifesta Journal. 16. Archived from the original on 2013-06-02.
- Ahmady, Leeza (March 31, 2015). "From Central Asia to the Caucasus, Leeza Ahmady in conversation with Taus Makhacheva". Ibraaz (Interview) (8).
- Ahmady, Leeza; Rana, Rashid (2017). "On Kings, Films and Astral Nomads". 15 Invitations for 15 Years: Present Elsewhere by Rashid Rana. Asia Art Archive. pp. 103–109.
