= Almaty Museum of Arts =

Art museum in Almaty, Kazakhstan

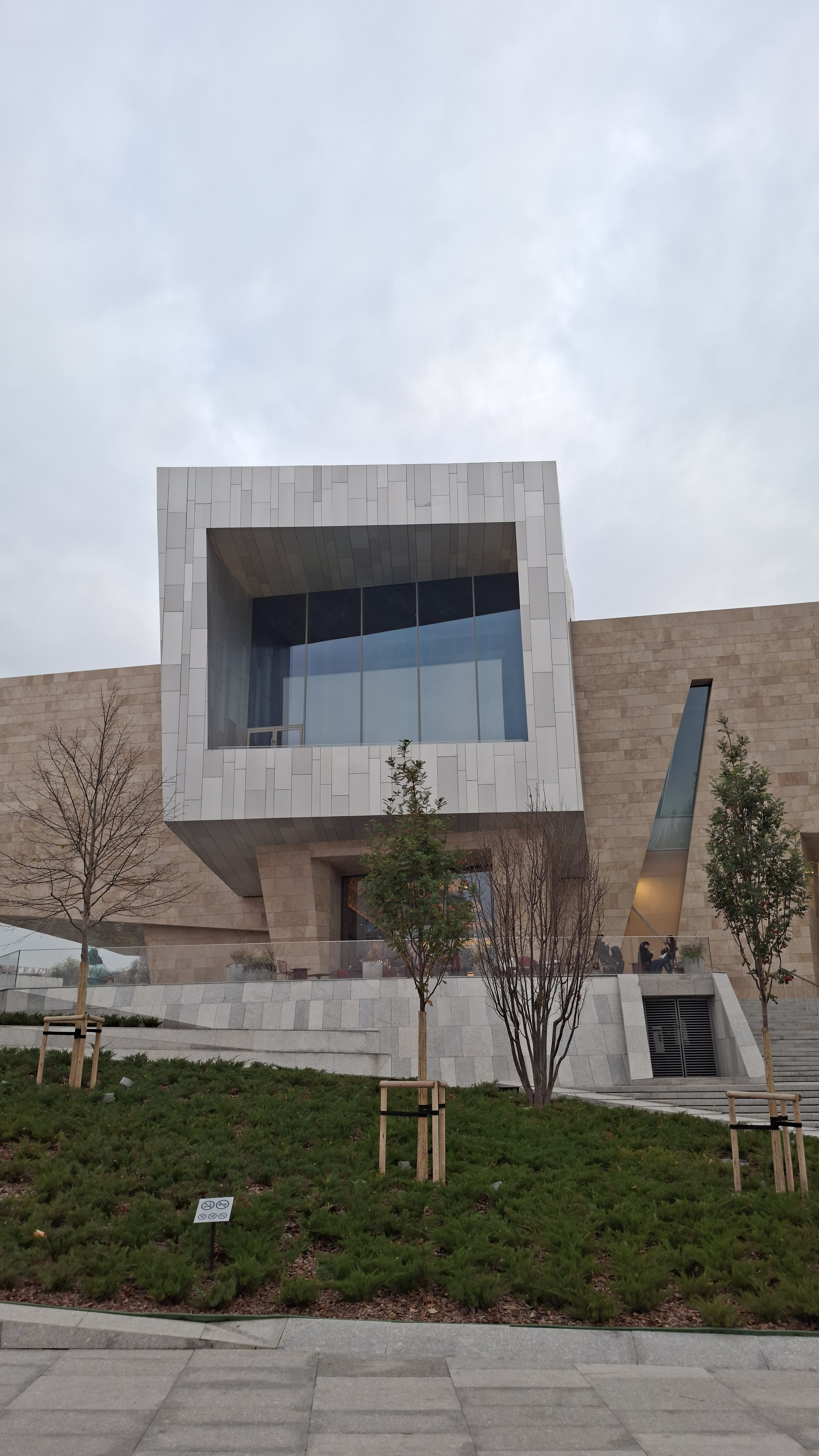
- Interactive map of the Almaty Museum of Arts area

General information
- Location: Almaty, Kazakhstan
- Opened: 2025

Design and construction
- Architect: Chapman Taylor

Website
- https://almaty.art

Almaty Museum of Arts (ALMA) is a private museum of modern and contemporary art in Almaty, Kazakhstan. It was founded by entrepreneur Nurlan Smagulov and opened to the public on 12 September 2025, becoming the largest institution of its kind in Central Asia and among the largest in the world.

Smagulov conceived the project after more than three decades of art collecting. Construction began in 2022 to a design by the British architectural practice Chapman Taylor.

The 9,400 m² building consists of two interlocking L-shaped volumes: one clad in aluminium, evoking the modern city, and the other in limestone, referencing the Tian Shan mountains.

== Collection ==
The core of the collection derives from Smagulov's private holdings, which number over 700 works assembled over thirty years. Around 70% are by Kazakh artists of the Soviet period (1950s–1980s), including Zhanatay Shardenov, Tokbolat Toguzbaev, Salikhitdin Aitbaev, and Aisha Galimbaeva.

The museum also highlights contemporary art from Kazakhstan and Central Asia, with works by Rustam Khalfin, Saule Suleimenova, Erbossyn Meldibekov, the duo Elena and Viktor Vorobyov, Said Atabekov, Bakhyt Bubikanova, and others.

Its international section features works by Anselm Kiefer, Yayoi Kusama, Bill Viola, Richard Serra, Jaume Plensa, Yinka Shonibare, among others. The collection spans painting, graphics, sculpture, installation, video and photo art, and textile pieces, situating Kazakh art within a dialogue with global artistic trends.

== Opening exhibitions ==
Two major exhibitions marked the museum's inauguration. A retrospective of Almagul Menlibayeva titled I Understand Everything presented over 30 years of her work, including painting, video art, textiles, and performances exploring identity, feminism, and ecology. The exhibition title refers to one of her late-1980s paintings symbolizing the transitional era.

The second show, Guests (Қонақтар), curated by Inga Lāce, was the first presentation of the museum's collection. It examined the theme of hospitality in Kazakhstan, from traditional celebrations to the histories of migration and displacement. Works ranged from classic pieces (Galimbaeva, Aitbaev, Yevgeniy Sidorkin) to contemporary artists (Meldibekov, Suleimenova, and the Vorobyovs).

== Architecture and facilities ==
The museum occupies a 9–10,000 m² site at the intersection of Nazarbayev Avenue and Al-Farabi Avenue. Designed by Chapman Taylor, the architecture reflects Almaty's position at the foot of the mountains: two intersecting blocks clad in limestone and aluminium symbolize the natural landscape of the Tian Shan and the dynamism of the metropolis.

At its heart is an 18-metre atrium, Art Street, inspired by the Charyn Canyon, designed as a public gathering space. The interiors include galleries for temporary and permanent exhibitions (Ұлы дала, Сарыарқа), collection storage, a conservation workshop, an education centre, a café, and a shop. The outdoor area features monumental sculptures by Plensa, Shonibare, and Alicja Kwade, extending the exhibition experience into the open air.

== Funding and governance ==
The museum was established entirely with private funds from Smagulov and his company Astana Motors. According to the architects, approximately US$30 million was invested in construction and around US$70 million in the collection and equipment. Conceived as a non-profit cultural initiative, the museum is supported by an endowment fund and the "Dostar" friends' programme, aimed at making the institution a collective public asset rather than a private endeavour.

Plans include the creation of a board of trustees and a potential shift to a mixed governance model with state participation, intended to secure long-term stability and continuity.

== Links ==
- Almaty Museum of Arts
