= List of largest museums =

Museums hold large collections of items relating to their subject, building some of the largest complexes in the world in order to store and exhibit the collection in a controlled atmosphere. The world's most important museums have also engaged in various expansion projects through the years, expanding their total exhibition space.

== List ==
The following is a list of museums ranked according to their floor area where published by reliable sources. Only museums with more than 20,000 square meters (220,000 sq ft) of floor space are included. Entries are not ranked as large museums that do not have reliably-sourced statistics may be omitted; this is not necessarily a complete list.

Building	Name	City	Year established	Subject	Floor area	Exhibition space	Collection (number of artifacts)	Country
	Louvre	Paris	1792	Art, architecture, history	758,000 m^{2} (8,160,000 sq ft)	72,735 m^{2} (782,910 sq ft)	645,797, of which 30,000 are on display (2021)	France
	Grand Egyptian Museum	Giza	2024	Archaeology	470,000 m^{2} (5,100,000 sq ft)	40,000 m^{2} (430,000 sq ft)	100,000+	Egypt
	State Hermitage Museum	Saint Petersburg	1764	Art	233,345 m^{2} (2,511,700 sq ft)	100,000 m^{2} (1,100,000 sq ft)	3,150,428	Russia
	Metropolitan Museum of Art	New York City	1870	Art	200,000 m^{2} (2,200,000 sq ft)	58,800 m^{2} (633,000 sq ft)		United States
	National Museum of China	Beijing	1959	Archaeology and art	191,900 m^{2} (2,066,000 sq ft)	65,000 m^{2} (700,000 sq ft)	1,400,000+	China
	American Museum of Natural History	New York City	1869	Natural History	166,296 m^{2} (1,790,000 sq ft)		32,000,000	United States
	Palace Museum	Beijing	1925	Archaeology and art	150,000 m^{2} (1,600,000 sq ft)		1,862,690	China
	National Museum of Korea	Seoul	1945	Archaeology and art	138,156.26 m^{2} (1,487,101.6 sq ft)			South Korea
	National Museum of Natural History	Washington, D.C.	1910	Natural history	123,000 m^{2} (1,320,000 sq ft)	30,200 m^{2} (325,000 sq ft)	(Artifacts not samples)	United States
	National Gallery of Art	Washington, D.C.	1937	Art	120,000 m^{2} (1,300,000 sq ft)	25,200 m^{2} (271,000 sq ft)	150,000+	United States
	Field Museum of Natural History	Chicago	1894	Natural History	111,484 m^{2} (1,200,000 sq ft)			United States
	National Museum of the United States Air Force	Dayton	1923	Aerospace	104,000 m^{2} (1,120,000 sq ft)			United States
	Art Institute of Chicago	Chicago	1879	Art	93,000 m^{2} (1,000,000 sq ft)		300,000 (almost)	United States
	British Museum	London	1753	Archaeology and art	92,000 m^{2} (990,000 sq ft)	65,752 m^{2} (707,750 sq ft)	8,000,000	United Kingdom
	National Air and Space Museum	Washington, D.C.	1946	Aerospace	85,600 m^{2} (921,000 sq ft)	14,970.9 m^{2} (161,145 sq ft)	60,000+	United States
	Museo Reina Sofía	Madrid	1992	Art	84,048 m^{2} (904,690 sq ft)			Spain
	Virginia Museum of Fine Arts	Richmond	1934	Art	82,853.8 m^{2} (891,831 sq ft)	13,200 m^{2} (142,100 sq ft)		United States
	Israel Museum	Jerusalem	1965	Art	80,000 m^{2} (860,000 sq ft)	19,000 m^{2} (200,000 sq ft)		Israel
	Canadian Museum of History	Gatineau	1856	History	75,000 m^{2} (810,000 sq ft)	25,000 m^{2} (270,000 sq ft)		Canada
	Royal Ontario Museum	Toronto	1912	Art, Culture, Nature	74,000 m^{2} (800,000 sq ft)		18,000,000	Canada
	National Museum of Modern and Contemporary Art	Gwacheon	1969	Art	73,000 m^{2} (790,000 sq ft)			South Korea
	National Museum of American History	Washington, D.C.	1964	History	70,000 m^{2} (750,000 sq ft)		1,800,000+	United States
	Deutsches Museum	Munich	1903	Science and technology	66,000 m^{2} (710,000 sq ft)	40,000 m^{2} (430,000 sq ft)	125,000	Germany
	Museum of Modern Art	New York City	1929	Art	65,800 m^{2} (708,000 sq ft)	15,400 m^{2} (166,000 sq ft)	200,000 (almost)	United States
	National Gallery Singapore	Singapore	2015	Art	64,000 m^{2} (690,000 sq ft)		9,000+	Singapore
	Uffizi	Florence	1865	Art	63,000 m^{2} (680,000 sq ft)	13,000 m^{2} (140,000 sq ft)		Italy
	Indianapolis Museum of Art	Indianapolis	1883	Art	62,000 m^{2} (670,000 sq ft)	16,600 m^{2} (179,000 sq ft)		United States
	Detroit Institute of Arts	Detroit	1885	Art	61,100 m^{2} (658,000 sq ft)		65,000+	United States
	Pergamon Museum	Berlin	1910	Archaeology and art	60,200 m^{2} (648,000 sq ft)+	18,200 m^{2} (196,000 sq ft)+		Germany
	Cité du Train	Mulhouse	1971	Railway	60,000 m^{2} (650,000 sq ft)	35,000 m^{2} (380,000 sq ft)		France
	Art & History Museum	Brussels	1835	Art, archaeology, history	60,000 m^{2} (650,000 sq ft)			Belgium
	Musée d'Orsay	Paris	1986	Art	57,400 m^{2} (618,000 sq ft)			France
	Museum of Fine Arts, Boston	Boston	1870	Art	57,315.3 m^{2} (616,937 sq ft)	20,556.4 m^{2} (221,267 sq ft)	500,000 (almost)	United States
	MASS MoCA	North Adams	1999	Art	56,000 m^{2} (600,000 sq ft)	23,000 m^{2} (250,000 sq ft)	No permanent collection	United States
	Vatican Museums	Vatican City	1506	art and archaeology	55,000 m^{2} (590,000 sq ft)	43,000 m^{2} (460,000 sq ft)		Vatican City
	National Museum of Norway	Oslo	2003	Art	54,600 m^{2} (588,000 sq ft)	13,000 m^{2} (140,000 sq ft)		Norway
	National Gallery of Canada	Ottawa	1880	Art	53,265 m^{2} (573,340 sq ft)	12,400 m^{2} (133,000 sq ft)		Canada
	Montreal Museum of Fine Arts	Montreal	1860	Art	53,095 m^{2} (571,510 sq ft)	13,000 m^{2} (140,000 sq ft)	47,000	Canada
	Museu Nacional d'Art de Catalunya	Barcelona	1934	Art	51,600 m^{2} (555,000 sq ft)	12,793 m^{2} (137,700 sq ft)		Spain
	Minneapolis Institute of Art	Minneapolis	1883	Art	50,600 m^{2} (545,000 sq ft)	32,000 m^{2} (340,000 sq ft)	100,000+	United States
	Kanal	Brussels	2017	Modern and contemporary art	49,000 m^{2} (530,000 sq ft)	9,800 m^{2} (105,000 sq ft)		Belgium
	The Henry Ford	Dearborn	1929	History	48,600 m^{2} (523,000 sq ft)			United States
	Cincinnati Museum Center	Cincinnati	1990	History	46,451.52 m^{2} (500,000.0 sq ft)			United States
	National Gallery	London	1824	Art	46,396 m^{2} (499,400 sq ft)			United Kingdom
	Three Gorges Museum	Chongqing	2005	Archaeology and art	45,098 m^{2} (485,430 sq ft)	23,225 m^{2} (249,990 sq ft)		China
	Rijksmuseum	Amsterdam	1800	Art	45,000 m^{2} (480,000 sq ft)	30,000 m^{2} (320,000 sq ft)		Netherlands
	National Museum of Anthropology	Mexico City	1825	Archaeology	45,000 m^{2} (480,000 sq ft)	17,440.18 m^{2} (187,724.5 sq ft)	600,000	Mexico
	Art Gallery of Ontario	Toronto	1900	Art	45,000 m^{2} (480,000 sq ft)	12,000 m^{2} (129,000 sq ft)	80,000	Canada
	Polish History Museum	Warsaw	2023	History	44,000 m^{2} (470,000 sq ft)	9,700 m^{2} (104,000 sq ft)		Poland
	San Francisco Museum of Modern Art	San Francisco	1935	Art	43,000 m^{2} (460,000 sq ft)	16,000 m^{2} (170,000 sq ft)		United States
	Museo del Prado	Madrid	1819	Art	42,000 m^{2} (450,000 sq ft)		20,500 (+/-)	Spain
	Canadian War Museum	Ottawa	1942	History	40,860 m^{2} (439,800 sq ft)		3,000,000	Canada
	Royal Museum of the Armed Forces and Military History	Brussels	1923	Military	40,000 m^{2} (430,000 sq ft)			Belgium
	Humboldt Forum	Berlin	2020	Archaeology and art	40,000 m^{2} (430,000 sq ft)			Germany
	California Academy of Sciences	San Francisco	1853	Natural History	38,090 m^{2} (410,000 sq ft)			United States
	Denver Art Museum	Denver	1918	Art	37,700 m^{2} (406,000 sq ft)			United States
	National Campus for the Archaeology of Israel	Jerusalem	2025	Archeology	36,000 m^{2} (390,000 sq ft)			Israel
	Tate Modern	London	2000	Art	34,500 m^{2} (371,000 sq ft)	12,427 m^{2} (133,760 sq ft)		United Kingdom
	Dallas Museum of Art	Dallas	1903	Art	34,000 m^{2} (370,000 sq ft)	14,000 m^{2} (150,000 sq ft)	24,000+	United States
	Pinakothek der Moderne	Munich	2002	Art	33,300 m^{2} (358,000 sq ft)	12,000 m^{2} (130,000 sq ft)		Germany
	Neue Pinakothek	Munich	1853	Art	30,616 m^{2} (329,550 sq ft)			Germany
	Kennedy Space Center Visitor Complex	Merritt Island	1962	Space	30,000 m^{2} (320,000 sq ft)			United States
	Evergreen Aviation & Space Museum	McMinnville	1991	Aerospace	28,800 m^{2} (310,000 sq ft)			United States
	Petersen Automotive Museum	Los Angeles	1994	Automobiles	28,000 m^{2} (300,000 sq ft)			United States
	The National WWII Museum	New Orleans	2000	History	27,870 m^{2} (300,000 sq ft)			United States
	Strategic Air Command & Aerospace Museum	Ashland	1959	Aerospace	27,870 m^{2} (300,000 sq ft)			United States
	Museum of Flight	Seattle	1965	Aerospace	27,828 m^{2} (299,540 sq ft)			United States
	National Museum	Prague	1818		26,740 m^{2} (287,800 sq ft)	12,000 m^{2} (130,000 sq ft)		Czech Republic
	Canada Aviation and Space Museum	Ottawa	1964	Aerospace	26,000 m^{2} (280,000 sq ft)			Canada
	Bode Museum	Berlin	1904	art and numismatics	25,300 m^{2} (272,000 sq ft)	11,500 m^{2} (124,000 sq ft)		Germany
	Musée National de l'Automobile	Mulhouse	1982	Automobiles	25,000 m^{2} (270,000 sq ft)	17,000 m^{2} (180,000 sq ft)		France
	Pima Air & Space Museum	Tucson	1976	Aerospace	23,226 m^{2} (250,000 sq ft)			United States
	Palais des Beaux-Arts de Lille	Lille	1809	Art	22,000 m^{2} (240,000 sq ft)	12,000 m^{2} (130,000 sq ft)		France
	Musée National d'Art Moderne	Paris	1947	Art	20,710 m^{2} (222,900 sq ft)	18,110 m^{2} (194,900 sq ft)	127,665	France
	Museum of Science and Industry	Chicago	1933	Science and technology		37,000 m^{2} (400,000 sq ft)	35,000+	United States
	Toledo Museum of Art	Toledo, Ohio	1901	Art		26,000 m^{2} (280,000 sq ft)		United States
	Victoria and Albert Museum	London	1852	Art		30,000 m^{2} (320,000 sq ft)	2,278,183 (60,124 on display)	United Kingdom
	German Museum of Technology	Berlin	1982	Science and technology		28,500 m^{2} (307,000 sq ft)		Germany
	Science Museum	London	1857	Science and technology		27,500 m^{2} (296,000 sq ft)		United Kingdom
	Germanisches Nationalmuseum	Nuremberg	1852	Art, architecture, history		27,000 m^{2} (290,000 sq ft)	1,300,000+	Germany
	Cité des Sciences et de l'Industrie	Paris	1986	Science and technology		30,000 m^{2} (320,000 sq ft)		France
	Shandong Art Museum	Jinan	1977	Art				China
	Arsenal (Biennale)	Venice	1895	Art				Italy
	Pavilhão Ciccillo Matarazzo	São Paulo	1951	Art				Brazil
	Dia Beacon	Beacon	2003	Art				United States
	Tokyo National Art Center	Tokyo	2007	Art				Japan
	National Taiwan Museum of Fine Arts	Taichung	1988	Art				Taiwan
	National Gallery Prague (Veletržní)	Prague	1796	Art		13,500 m^{2} (145,000 sq ft)		Czech Republic
	Bavarian National Museum	Munich	1855	Art		13,000 m^{2} (140,000 sq ft)		Germany
	Capital Museum	Beijing	1981	Archaeology and art				China
	Vienna Technical Museum	Vienna	1908	Science and technology		22,000 m^{2} (240,000 sq ft)		Austria
	National Gallery of Victoria (St Kilda Road)	Melbourne	1861	Art				Australia
	Palais de Tokyo	Paris	2001	Art				France
	Salar Jung Museum	Hyderabad	1855	Art			46,000 Art Objects, 8,000 Manuscripts and over 60,000 Printed Books	India
	Cleveland Museum of Art	Cleveland	1913	Art				United States
	Hamburger Kunsthalle	Hamburg	1869	Art		13,000 m^{2} (140,000 sq ft)		Germany
	Museum Boijmans Van Beuningen	Rotterdam	1849	Art				Netherlands
	Houston Museum of Fine Arts	Houston	1900	Art		27,870 m^{2} (300,000 sq ft)	70,000 (+/-)	United States
	National Gallery of Modern Art	New Delhi	1954	Art				India
	Tretyakov Gallery (Krymsky Val)	Moscow	1985	Art				Russia
	DASA (Deutsche Arbeitsschutzaustellung)	Dortmund	1993	Science and Technology		13.000 m²		Germany
	Patriot Park	Kubinka	2016	Military				Russia

== See also ==
- List of largest art museums
- List of largest buildings
- List of most visited museums
- List of national museums
