= Trinity Leeds =

Coordinates: 53.797°N 1.545°W

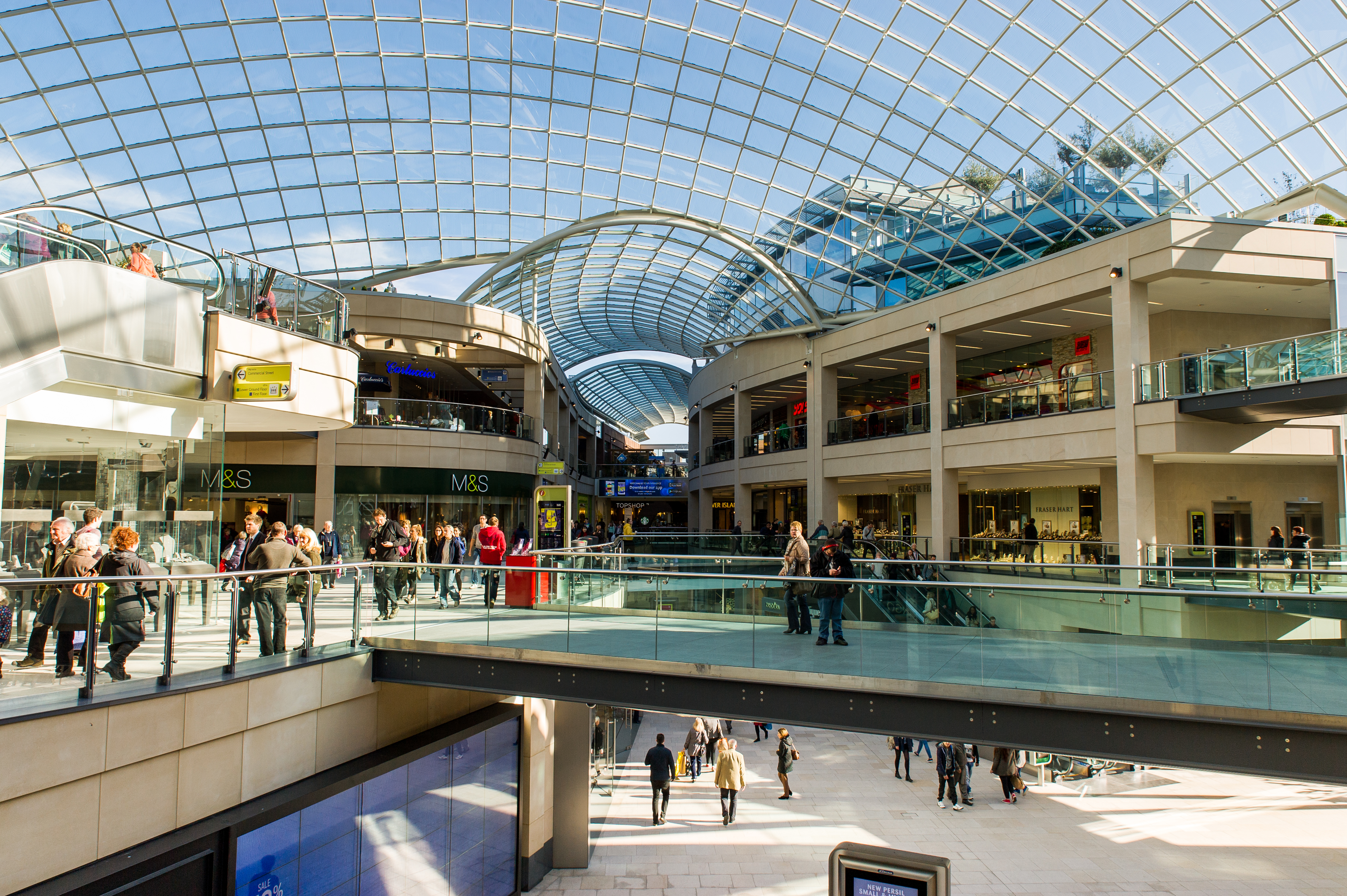
- Location: Leeds city centre, Leeds, United Kingdom
- Address: LS1 5ER
- Opened: 21 March 2013; 13 years ago
- Developer: Land Securities
- Owner: Land Securities
- Architect: Chapman Taylor
- Num. of stores: 120+
- Num. of anchor tenants: 7
- Floor area: 92,903 m^{2} (1,000,000 sq ft)
- Floors: 3
- Parking: Trinity Leeds (opposite the centre LS1 4AG)
- Website: www.trinityleeds.com

Trinity Leeds is a shopping and leisure centre in the city centre of Leeds, England, named after the adjacent 18th-century Holy Trinity Church. Developed by Land Securities and designed by Chapman Taylor, it opened on 21 March 2013, with over 130,000 recorded visitors on opening day.

The development is in two parts: Trinity East, a new build development on the site of the former Trinity and Burton Arcades, and Trinity West, the redeveloped Leeds Shopping Plaza. The development has a catchment of 5.5 million people offering a spend of £1.93 billion annually. It has lifted Leeds from seventh to fourth in the CACI UK retail rankings and has created over 3000 jobs. The combined scheme has 93,000 m^{2} (1,000,000 sq ft) of retail floor space for 120 stores anchored by the flagship Marks & Spencer and Topshop/Topman stores. These units existed as standalone stores and have been expanded and remodelled into Trinity Leeds.

The shopping centre has a concept food area in named Trinity Kitchen, hosting both permanent tenants and rotating "pop-up" vendors. Everyman Cinemas opened a 3,700 m^{2} (40,000 sq ft) four screen art-house cinema in the centre, its first premises in the north of England.

== History ==
=== Background ===
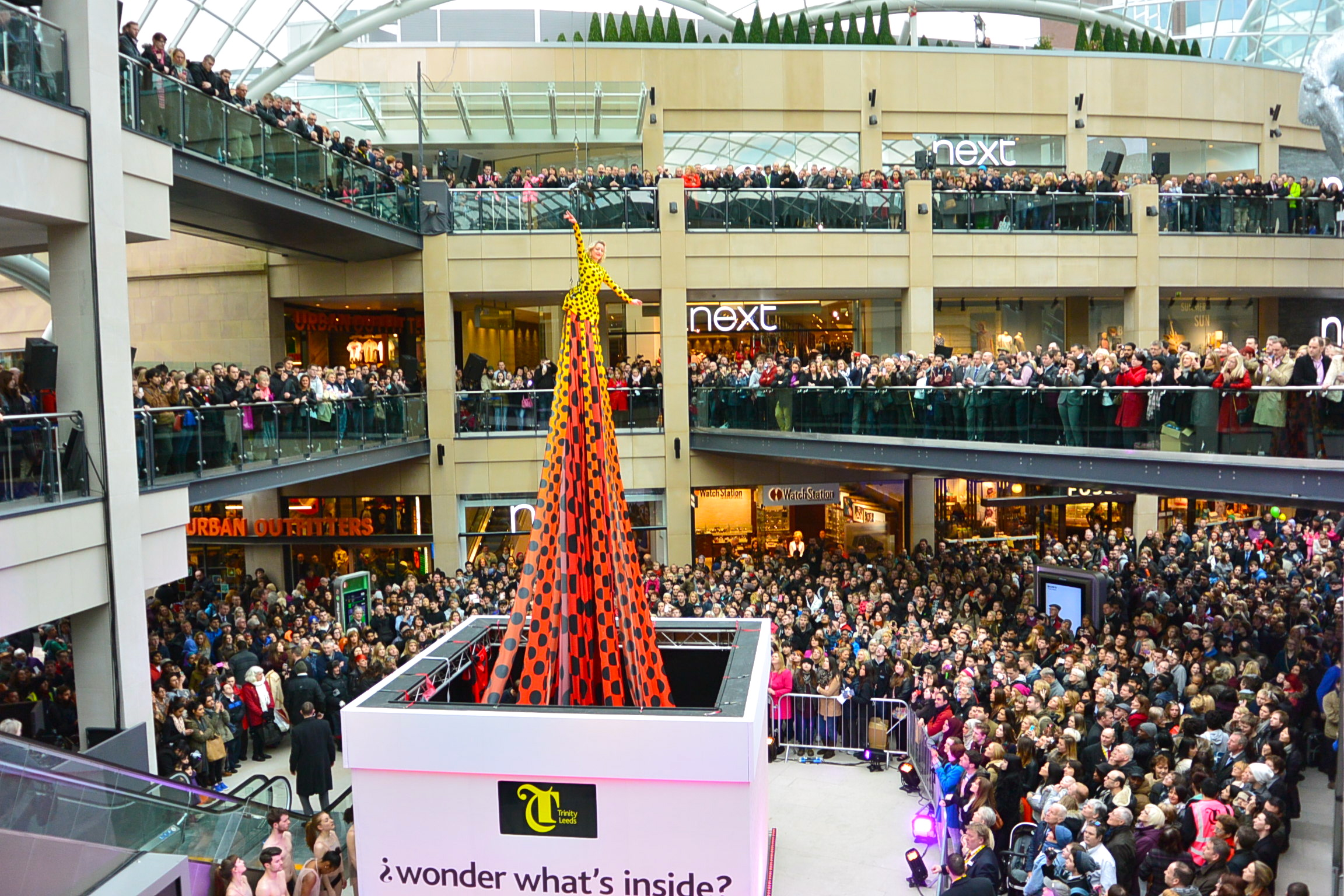
Opening day crowds

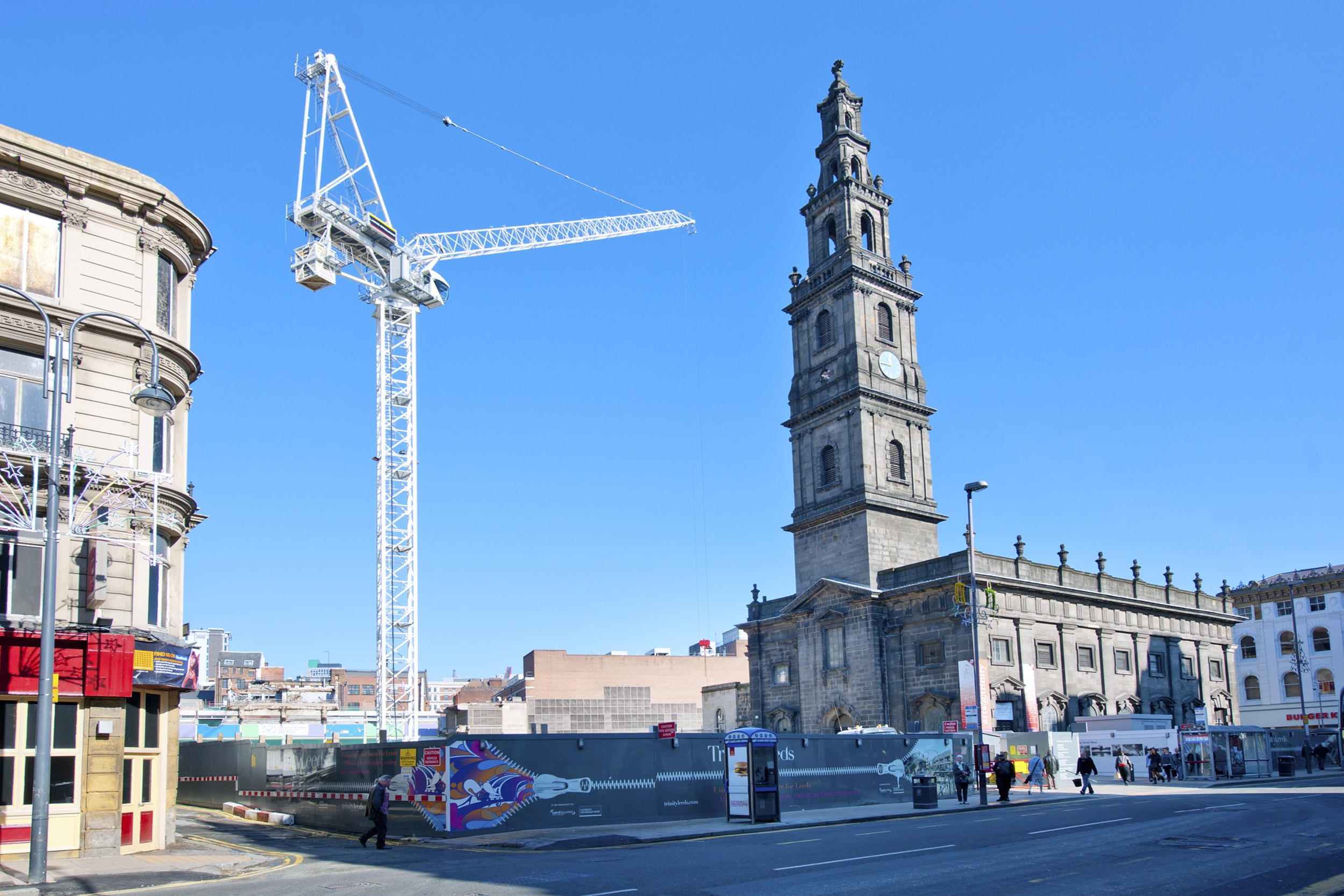
The site in 2010 with Holy Trinity Church in front

Since around 2000 plans were made to redevelop the adjacent Trinity and Burton Arcades, a largely run down shopping precinct which opened in 1973, into a modern shopping centre using designs by the late Enric Miralles under the name Trinity Quarter. However this had been long delayed because of arguments regarding planning between the then owners of both centres Universities Superannuation Scheme (USS), owner of the Trinity and Burton arcades, and Topps Estates, owner of the Leeds Shopping Plaza.

However, following the sale of Topps Estates to Land Securities in 2003, and the change in ownership of the Trinity and Burton Arcades to Caddick Group, and the granting of a compulsory purchase order by Leeds City Council, the process of constructing the centre could commence.

The development was a combination of several older developments including Leeds Shopping Plaza, which has been rebranded and remodelled as Trinity West. It was built as an independent shopping centre surrounded by the streets of Bond Street, Albion Street, Boar Lane and Lower Basinghall Street. It opened in 1977 as the Bond Street Centre on a site formerly occupied by Victorian-era buildings and was refurbished in 1996 which included giving the centre its present name, expanding the trading area to 25,000 m^{2} (270,000 sq ft).

The new-build part of Trinity, Trinity East, was formerly occupied by the Trinity & Burton Arcades, a 1970s development which included both open air and covered parts.

=== Construction ===
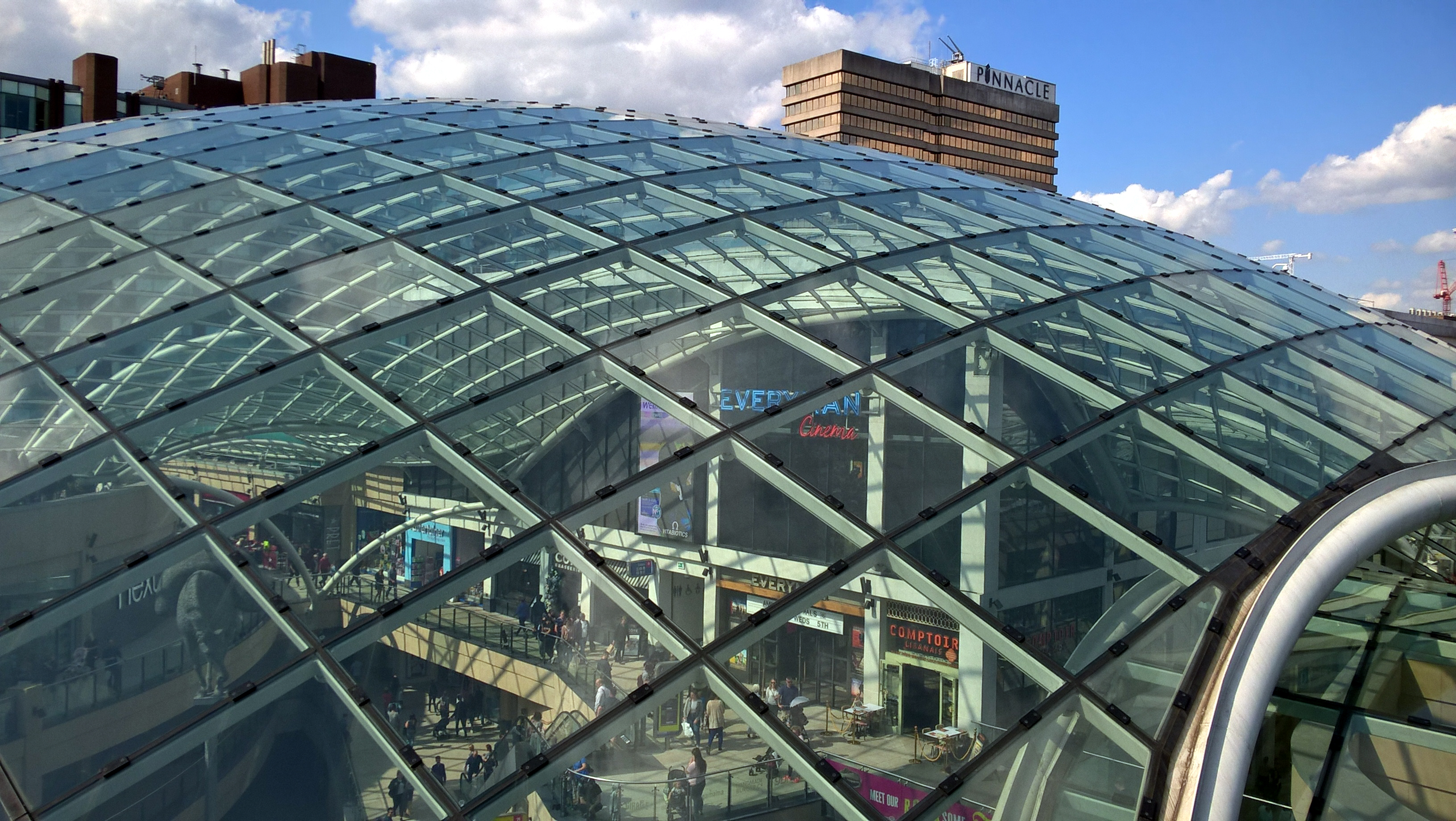
Glass roof from the rooftop terrace

Extensive preparation works were required, including the demolition of the previous development and frontages on Briggate, Albion Street and Boar Lane. Site clearance was complete by 2008. Development was delayed due to the Great Recession, but recommenced in 2010. Contractor Laing O'Rourke estimates that over 1000 construction workers worked on Trinity Leeds.

Initial construction started at Trinity East, where four tower cranes were used in its construction. Redevelopment of the Topshop/Topman store commenced in February 2012 after Topman and Topshop moved to temporary stores elsewhere in the city and was completed in October 2012. A 3,716 m^{2} (40,000 sq ft) glass dome is the centrepiece of Trinity East. Designed by SKM Anthony Hunts, its 1902 glass panels rise 30.5 m (100 ft) above street level. The dome is built on a steel framework, and during construction was supported on an immense scaffold structure, which when removed in early 2012 resulted in the dome sinking 20mm. The dome is large enough to fit the Leeds Corn Exchange under it.

Major works started at Trinity West in 2011 to remodel the centre's interior. Boar Lane Bus Point closed to create a new pavement and external remodelling involved removing cladding. A tower crane facilitated upward extensions to accommodate the flagship Primark store. Proposals were revealed for a media screen on the exterior of Trinity West.

== Arts ==
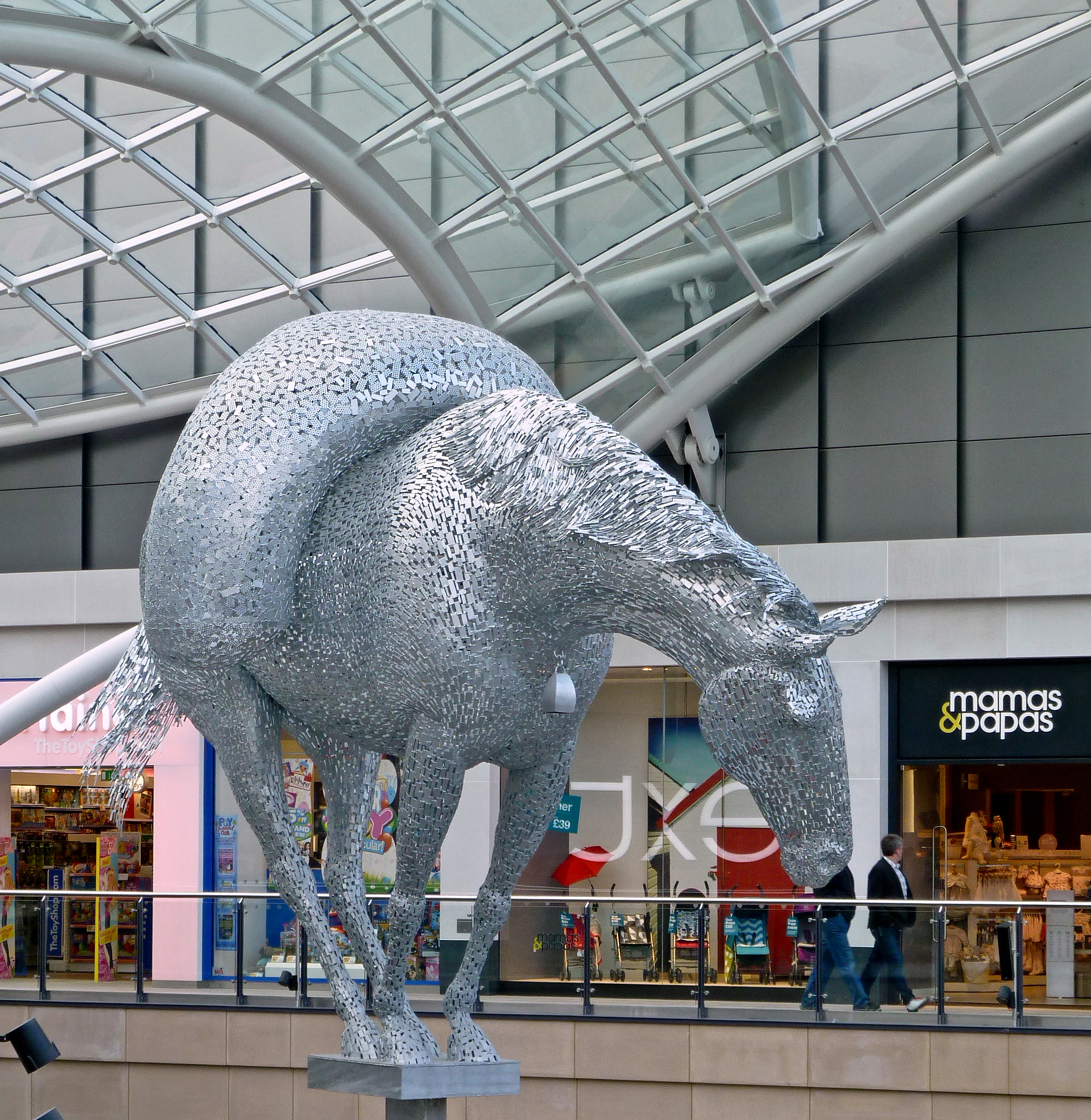
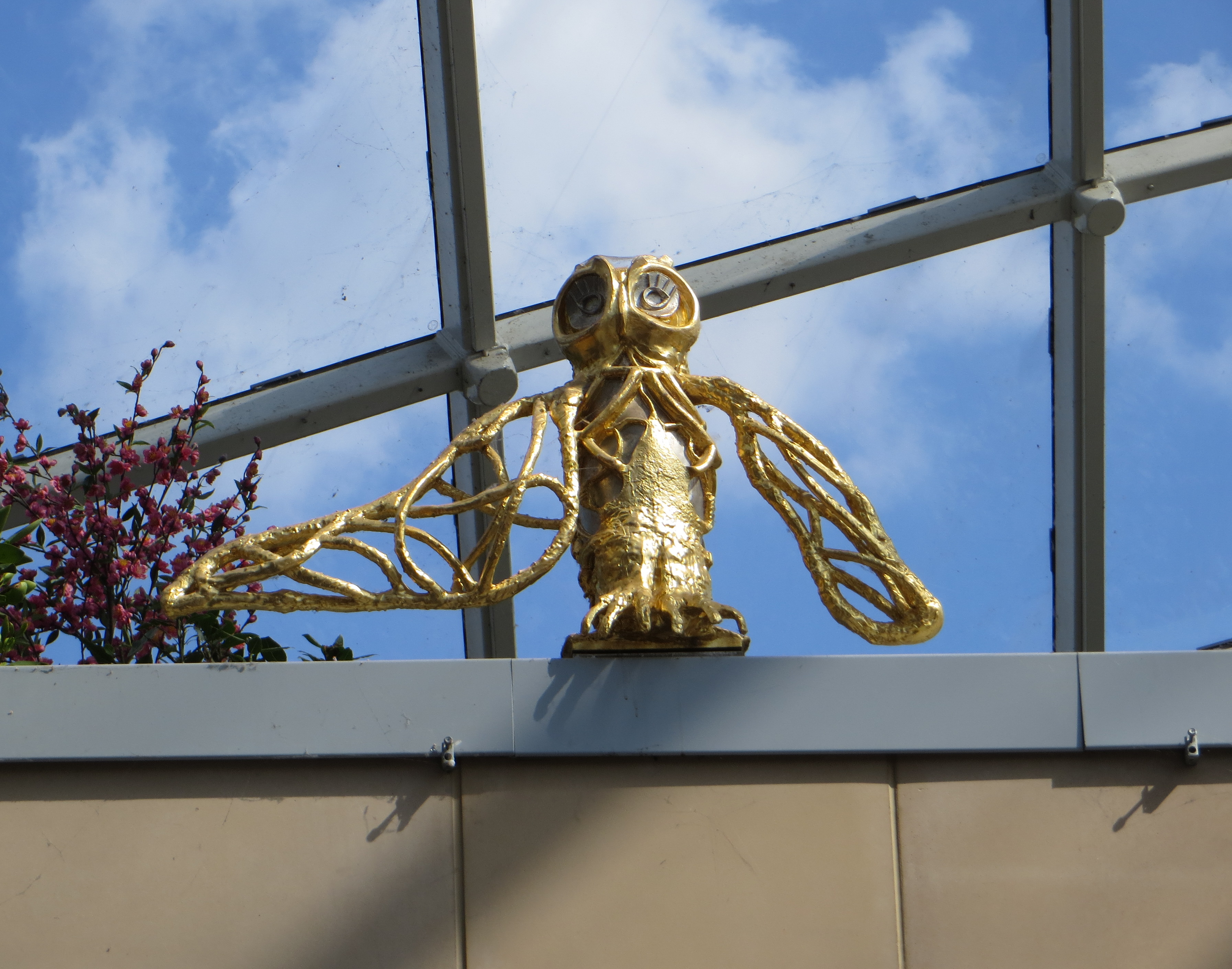
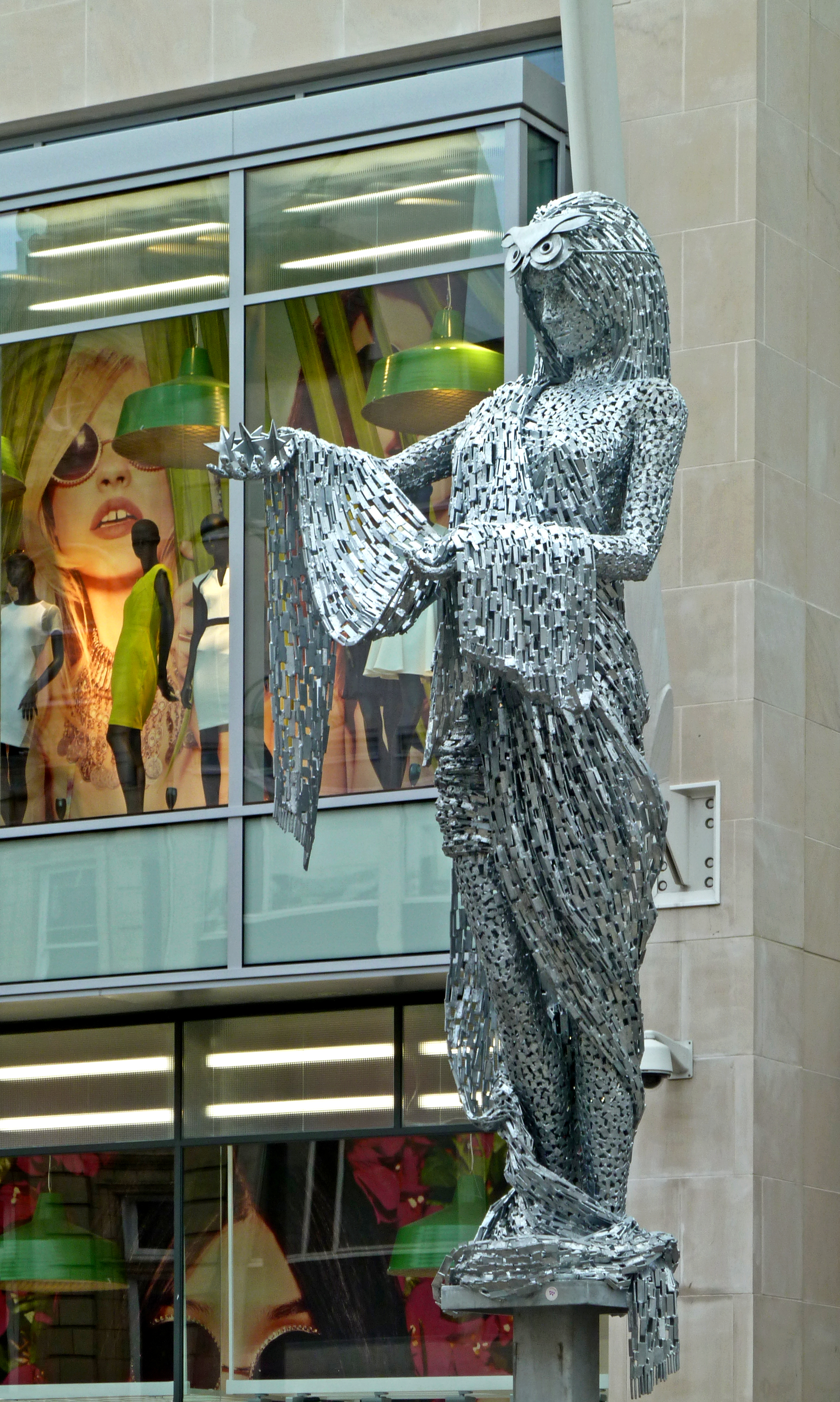
Equus Altus - a packhorse carrying cloth; The Owl; The Briggate Minerva, goddess of weaving and commerce

Equus Altus, a sculpture of a packhorse carrying a roll of cloth, dominates the central court, and The Briggate Minerva, stands outside the centre's entrance on Briggate. Both are by Scottish sculptor Andy Scott. Packhorses were used to transport goods, in particular cloth, to and from Leeds: the artist said "My thoughts behind it were about the history of Leeds and the wool and textile industries and how horses were used as the HGV at the time". Minerva was the Roman goddess of both commerce and weaving, making her appropriate to this site in a city with a strong heritage of textiles, and wears an owl mask, one of the symbols of the city. Equus Altus is 5 metres (16 ft) tall, weighs 2 tonnes, and stands on a 10 metres (33 ft) steel column. The two statues were installed in March 2013, having taken 10 months to create.

Perched near the roof (above Carluccio's) is a gilded bronze statue of an owl by Antonia Stowe.

Trinity plans to have a programme of permanent and public art in the centre. Projects undertaken, include the 2.8 Days Later film project in November 2011 run in conjunction with local production companies and Everyman Cinemas.

== Parking ==
The former NCP Boar Lane car park was refurbished and re-branded as the Trinity car park.

== See also ==
- Cabot Circus, a similar development in Bristol also by Chapman Taylor.
