= Vyacheslav Akhunov =

Uzbek visual artist and author (b. 1948)

- Вячеслав Ахунов
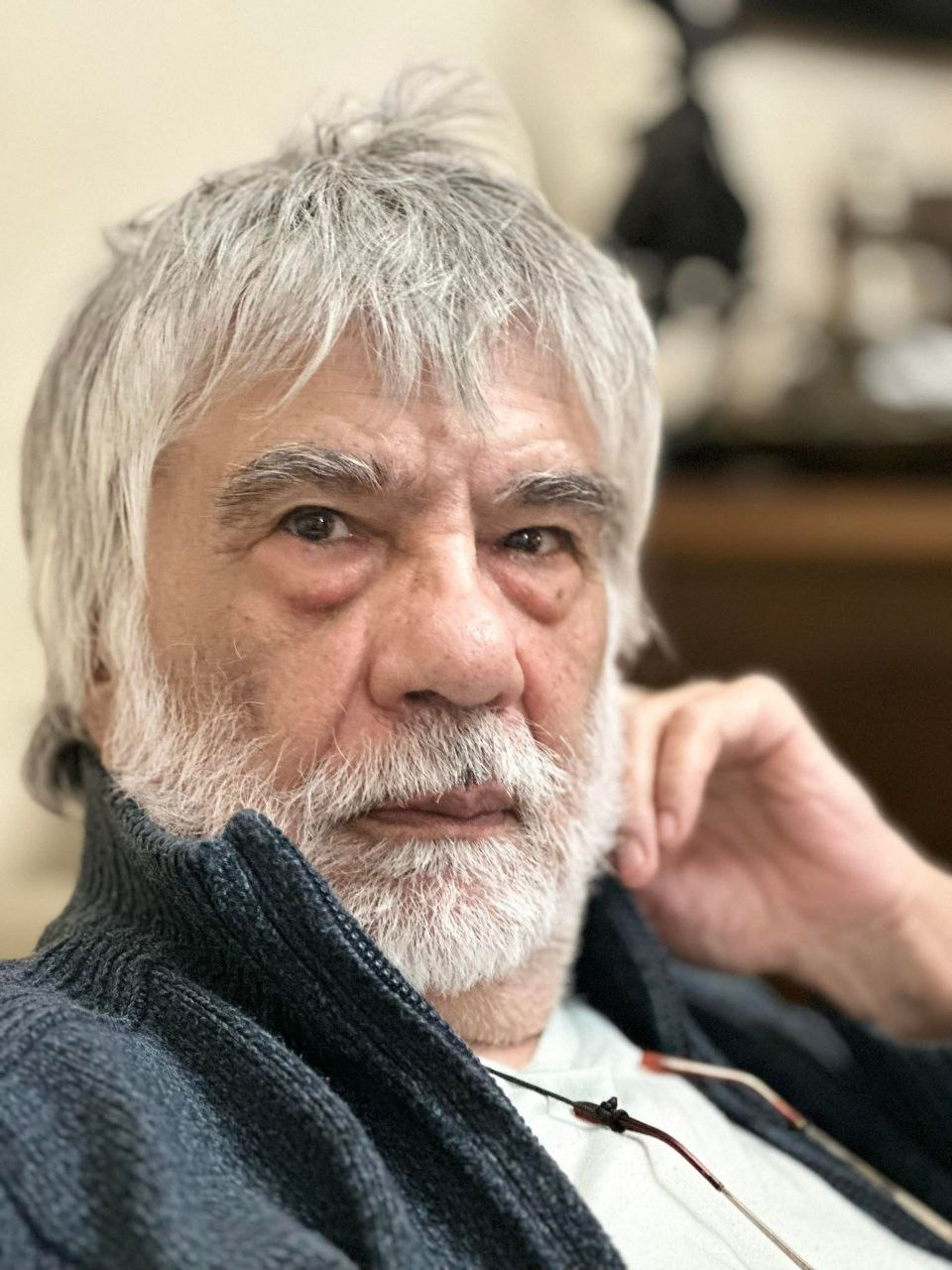
- Born: 1948 (age 77–78); Osh, Kirghiz Soviet Socialist Republic
- Other names: Vyacheslav Oxunov, Vjačeslav Romanovič Achunov, Vjačeslav Urumbaevič Achunov
- Occupations: Visual artist, author
- Known for: Performance art, video art, painting
- Movement: Central Asian art, Socialist modernist

Vyacheslav Akhunov (Kyrgyz: Вячеслав Ахунов; Uzbek: Vyacheslav Oxunov; born 1948), is a Kyrgyz-born Uzbek visual artist, and author. He is known for performance art, video art, and painting. Akhunov lives in Tashkent, Uzbekistan.

== Biography ==
Vyacheslav Akhunov was born in 1948 in Osh, Kirghiz Soviet Socialist Republic (present day Kyrgyzstan), his mother was Russian and his father was Uzbek. He graduated in 1979 from Moscow State Institute of Art (now Moscow School of Painting, Sculpture and Architecture).

He has actively spoken out about being silenced during the Soviet years, which inspired his large-scale installation work, Breathe Quietly (1976–2013) and subsequently after the country's independence in 1991.

== Artistic works and exhibitions ==
His artistic style started as conventional images of landscapes, workers and propaganda posters but changed to conceptualism after meeting a woman who introduced him to the Moscow Conceptualists group. His more recent work satirises Soviet slogans and propaganda in text and images.

Some of his notable art exhibitions include at the Palazzo Franchetti, as part of the 61st Venice Biennale in 2026, the 2nd Yinchuan Biennale, China (2018); BALAGAN!!!, Berlin (2015); 5th Moscow Biennale (2013); Pavilion of Central Asia at the Venice Biennale (2013, 2007, 2005); 1st Kiev Biennale (2012), Documenta (2013), Ostalgia, New Museum, New York (2011); Time of the Storytellers, KIASMA, Helsinki (2007); Montreal Biennale (2007); and 1st Singapore Biennale (2006).

Akhunov's work is in museum collections include the Urganch Photo Gallery (Uzbek: Urganch Suratlar Galereyasi), and the Auckland Art Gallery.

== Publications ==
- Akhunov, Vyacheslav; Ahmady, Leeza (2012). Vyacheslav Akhunov (art exhibition). dOCUMENTA (13): 100 Notizen. Hatje Cantz. ISBN 9783775729093.
- Tlostanova, Madina (2018). "Chapter 4. Beyond Dependencies: A Talk With Vyacheslav Akhunov, the Lonely Ranger of Uzbek Contemporary Art". What Does It Mean to Be Post-Soviet?: Decolonial Art from the Ruins of the Soviet Empire. Duke University Press. p. 99. ISBN 9780822371632.
