= Jane Durham =

British architect (1930–2019)

- Born: 23 February 1930; London
- Died: March 29, 2019 (aged 89); Guildford
- Occupation: Architect
- Known for: One of the first female founding partners of an architectural practice in Britain

Jane Durham (23 February 1930 – 29 March 2019) was a British architect and one of the first female founding partners of an architectural practice in Britain. She was one of the three co-founders of the architects Chapman Taylor Partners, though her name was never included in the firm's name.

== Early life and education ==
Jane Durham was born in London, and was the only child of an insurance company manager and his wife. She went to school in Surrey and her mother encouraged her to take up architecture as a career. Durham went to study at the Bartlett School of Architecture in London in 1949 after a year working in the office of Sir Aston Webb. There were only three women students in her first year at the Bartlett. Graduating in 1954, she then took up a job as an assistant architect at a small practice owned by Guy Morgan. There she worked on projects including the Humphries Building project in Knightsbridge and on the rebuilding of the east side of Stanhope Gardens in South Kensington.

== Chapman Taylor ==
The architects Bob Chapman and John Taylor, who also worked with Guy Morgan, invited her to join with them as a founding partner of Chapman Taylor in 1959. Durham had inherited money from her father, which helped to make this possible, but her name was not included in the title of the practice. The reason for this, she later recalled, was because at the time ‘all three of them thought she’d get married and have children within a couple of years’. This was something she regretted.

The practice office was originally based in the Grand Building in Trafalgar Square, London, and initially undertook residential projects but later made its name with the modernist design for New Scotland Yard. It set the precedent for the practice's later work including shopping centres and masterplans, as well as large-scale office buildings.

Durham played a pivotal role in the business operations of the practice, developing and managing systems to make sure that the buildings it designed were delivered on time and were high quality. From its inception, the practice had a manual, which outlined how projects should be run from beginning to completion, and there were weekly technical reviews which Durham initiated; the practice was also an early adopter of computer-aided design under Durham's guidance. Her entry in the Oxford Dictionary of National Biography suggested that the practice's global expansion and success 'had much to do with Durham's creation of a blueprint for a large-scale firm dedicated to working on commercial projects for leading developers. It is in this that her primary significance lies, especially given the decline of public practice from the 1980s onwards.’

Durham maintained her role as an architectural designer in the practice through projects such as a row of eight houses next to the Ritz Hotel, the upgrade of Carnaby Street, and large social housing projects for the Peabody association in Covent Garden and North Kensington.

== Interests, later life and death ==
In her spare time, Durham enjoyed fly fishing and cooking and was an active member of the National Trust. She retired from Chapman Taylor in 1990, but remained in contact with the company until her death in Guildford at the age of 89 in 2019.
