= Chapman Taylor =

Architectural firm

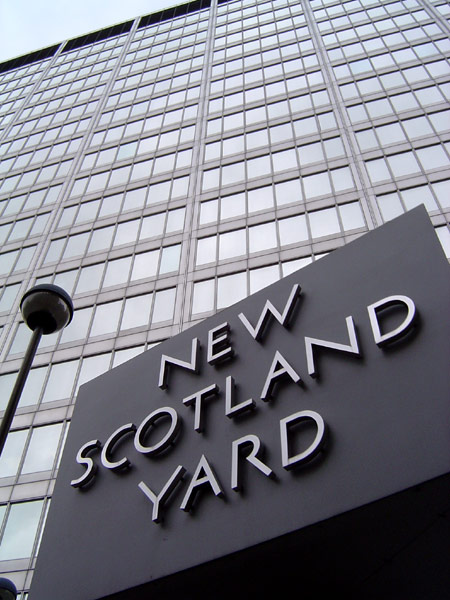
New Scotland Yard, Chapman Taylor's first design project in 1959

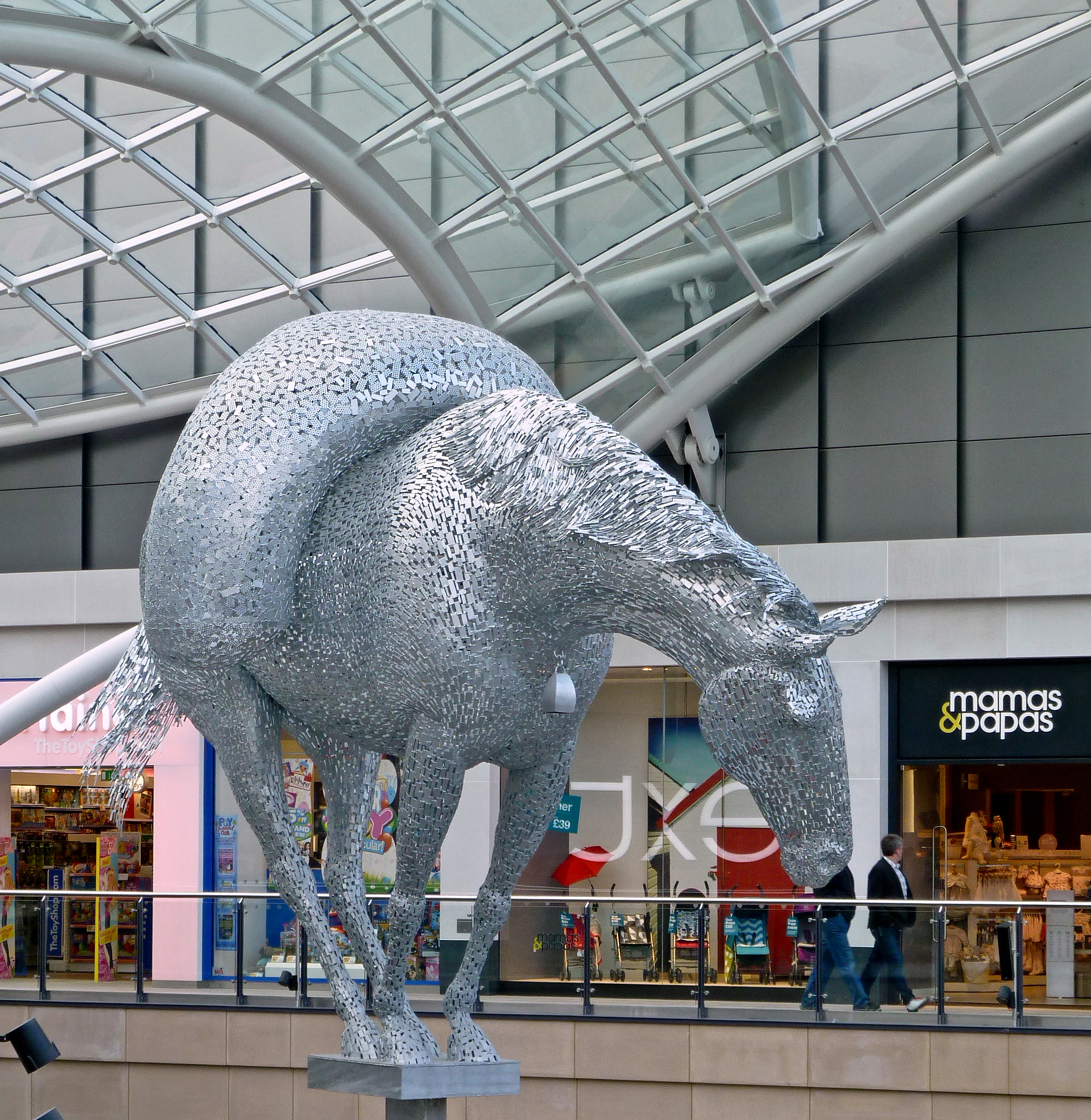
Trinity Leeds Shopping Centre, Leeds UK, Chapman Taylor project, opened 2013

Chapman Taylor is an international firm of architects, planners and interior designers based in Europe, Asia, and Africa. Its headquarters are in London, United Kingdom.

The practice has completed over 3,000 projects and won over 300 design awards over its history, including the UK Queen's Award.

Chapman Taylor specializes in residential, retail, leisure, hospitality, transportation and workplace design as well as the combination of these uses in large-scale mixed-use environments.

== History ==
The practice was established in the United Kingdom in 1959. Its first project was the design and delivery of New Scotland Yard, which became the headquarters of the London Metropolitan Police. During the 1970s, Chapman Taylor was part of the expansion of the retail sector in the United Kingdom.

In the 1980s, the practice was involved in several London masterplanning schemes, including Millbank Estate, for the Crown Estate Commissioners, a 27-acre (11 ha) Central London site.

In the early 1990s, the practice started designing many projects outside the UK and opened its first design studios in mainland Europe. The 2010s saw greater international expansion encompassing projects and offices across Europe, Asia, Central and South America, and Africa.

In 2006, Chapman Taylor won the Carbuncle Cup, as Drake Circus Shopping Centre was named the United Kingdom's new ugliest building. Founding partner Bob Chapman died in 2017. In 2019 founding partner Jane Durham died.

Since 2021, Chapman Taylor has faced criticism for its business activities in Azerbaijan, particularly its $2.4 million contract to redevelop the city of Shushi, which attracted scrutiny over the lack of transparency in the procurement process and the company's previous commercial relationships with businesses linked to Azerbaijan's ruling family. In 2024, the Avan Shushi Partnership filed a complaint alleging that Chapman Taylor had contributed to adverse human rights impacts on the city's population through its involvement in the redevelopment plan. In August 2025, the United Kingdom's National Contact Point determined that the allegations warranted further examination under the OECD Guidelines for Multinational Enterprises.

== Major projects ==
- Eldon Square Shopping Centre, Newcastle, UK (1976) – an urban shopping mall designed with sloping public spaces and dual 'ground floors'.
- Victoria Place, Victoria Station, London, UK (1987) – 80,000 square feet (7,400 m^{2}) of retail units suspended above the train platforms using the station's existing structure
- MediaCityUK, Manchester, UK (2010)
- Trinity Leeds, Leeds, UK
- Cabot Circus, Bristol, UK (2008)
- Global Harbor, Shanghai, China (2013)
- Liverpool Waters, Liverpool, UK (2013–)
- Heathrow Terminal 5, (Retail section) London, UK
- Heathrow Terminal 2, (Retail section) London, UK
- Mall of Qatar, Qatar (2016)
- St Pancras International, London, UK
- Trafford Centre, Manchester, UK (1998)
- Port Baku Tower, Azerbaijan
- Almaty Museum of Arts, Kazakhstan (2025)
- Grand Harbour regeneration, Malta
- Deniz Mall, Baku
- Shusha regeneration, Azerbaijan
