= Shandong Art Museum =

Art museum in Jinan, China

- 山东省美术馆
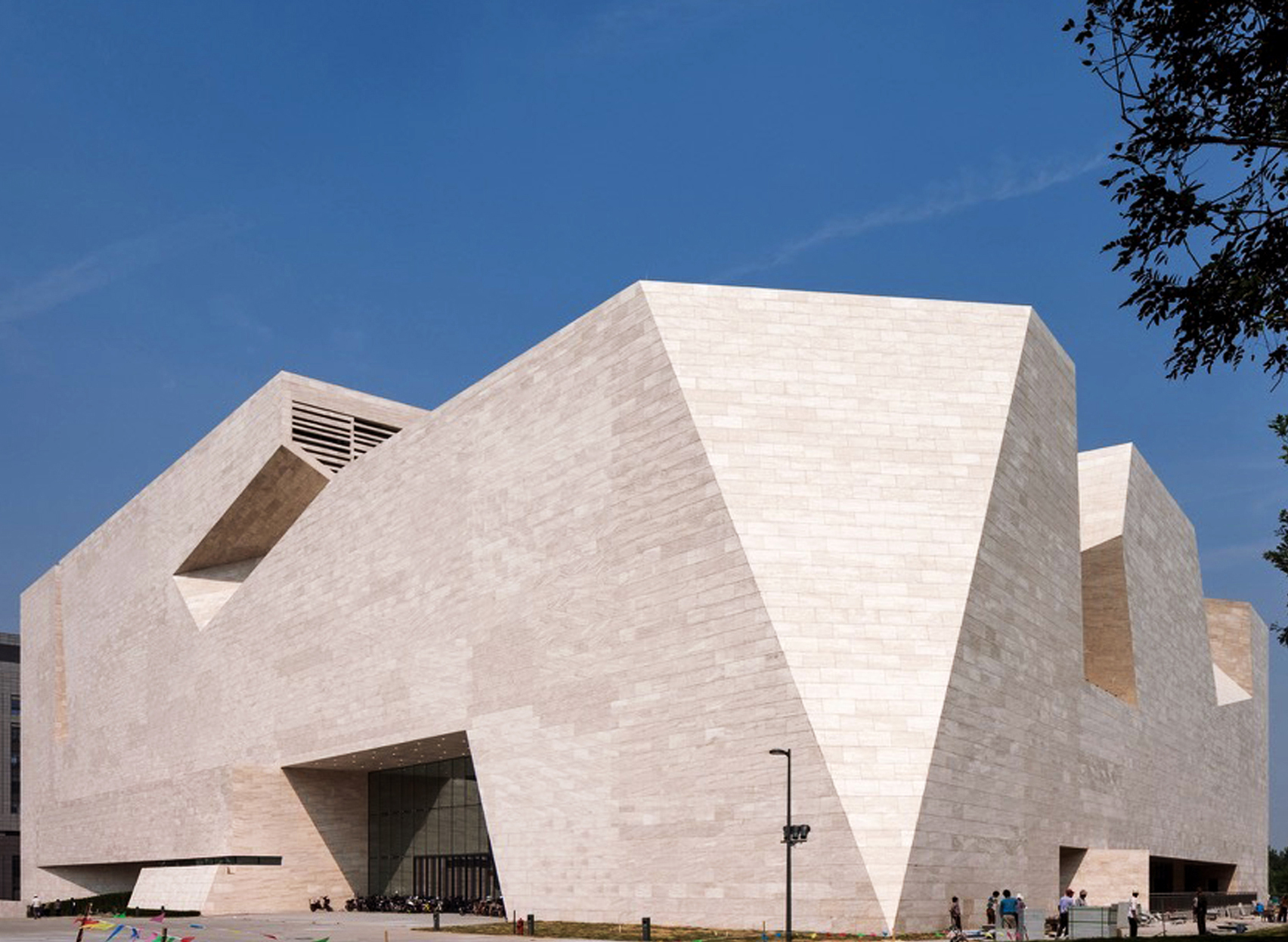
- Established: July 1977
- Location: Lixia District, Jinan, Shandong, China
- Type: Art museum

The Shandong Art Museum (Chinese: 山东省美术馆) is an art museum in the Lixia District of Jinan, China. First established in 1977, the museum relocated in a large building in 2013, near the Shandong Provincial Museum. It hosts a permanent collection of modern Chinese fine arts, and temporary exhibitions.

The museum is an affiliated nonprofit cultural institution under the Shandong Provincial Department of Culture and Tourism.

== See also ==
- List of largest art museums
