= Rahraw Omarzad =

Afghan writer, artist, and lecturer (born 1964)

Rahraw Omarzad (born 1964 in Kabul) is an Afghan writer, artist, lecturer and an expert on Afghan modern art and Afghan Contemporary Art from Afghanistan.

He is the founding director of the Centre for Contemporary Art Afghanistan (CCAA), a lecturer at Kabul University and editor in chief of Gahnama-e-Hunar Art Magazine. With support of Castello di Rivoli Turin Italy he left Afghanistan 2021. He is currently based in Germany.
