= Umai =

Umai is an umbrella or multifaceted native Dayak term deeply rooted in the Native Indonesian Cultural Heritage of the Dayak-origins, commonly practiced and originated from the native Dayak regions of Southern Kalimantan, Central Kalimantan, Eastern Kalimantan, and mainly southern parts of Western and Northern Kalimantan in Indonesia. Umai encompasses various Native Indonesian (Dayak) aspects of traditional life, including architecture, rituals, or even cuisine, depending on the context and specific Dayak ethnic group.

Since 2010, various Umai traditions practiced throughout Indonesia officially recognized and regarded by the Ministry of Education, Culture, Research, and Technology of Republic Indonesia as integral part of the National Intangible Cultural Heritage of Indonesia.

== As architecture ==
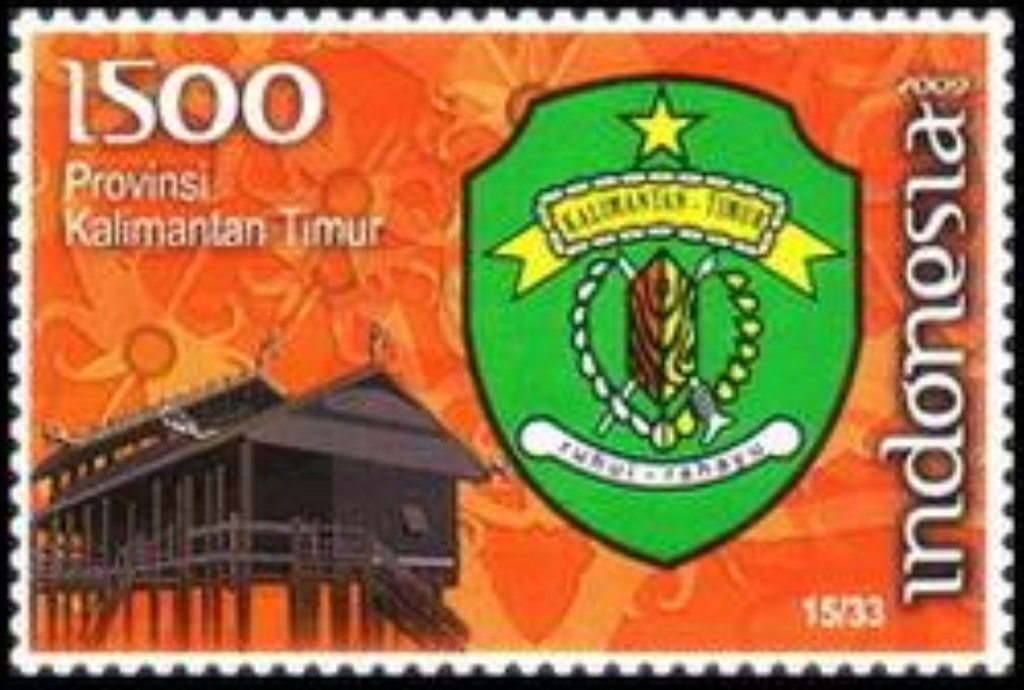
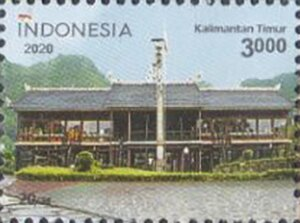
Traditional Dayak architecture of East Kalimantan on the 2009 and 2020 Indonesian Stamp edition.

In Eastern Kalimantan, Umai serves as an embodiment of motherly nature to protect people from the heats and attacks of the wild animals. The traditional Dayak architecture in Eastern Kalimantan characterized by its longhouse architectural model, known natively as Huma Betang Umai in native local Dayak term, translated as “the Umai longhouse”, literally “motherly sanctuary/house”. According to the official Nusantara press, the Umai house is said to be the source of inspiration for the upcoming National Indonesian Palace for the Vice President located in Nusantara, Indonesia’s national capital in Eastern Kalimantan. The project is part of the Indonesian government’s commitment to accelerating the realization of Nusantara as a modern, green, and sustainable administrative hub that are connecting to the indigenous Dayak identity. The palace is expected to serve not only as a symbol of executive power but also as a reflection of Nusantara’s vision as an environmentally and indigenously friendly smart city.

== As rituals ==
Deep in the jungle of Sungai Utik located at Embaloh Hulu district of Kapuas Hulu Regency in Western Kalimantan, Umai specifically refers to the traditional Dayak farming ceremony. Human-like sculptures are traditionally carved and blessed by the locals during the ritual, known as Agum in native local Dayak term. It is believed that it will protect their native Dayak field from any dangers, may it be from flooding, pest, forest fire, or anything that may harm the crops.
