= Kasmalieva & Djumaliev =

Kyrgyzstani artist couple

Gulnara Kasmalieva (born 1960) and Muratbek Djumaliev (born 1965), natives of Bishkek, Kyrgyzstan, are a visual arts couple working together as Kasmalieva & Djumaliev. The majority of their works are filmed and photographed social documentaries or multi-screen installation art. Based in Bishkek, they have exhibited their works since 1988 in venues around the world.

== Artistic career ==
Kasmalieva studied fine art at the Surikov Institute of Art in Moscow and Djumaliev at the Vera Mukhina Academy in Leningrad (now St Petersburg). Afterwards they worked in the Kirghiz Soviet Socialist Republic, which gained independence as Kyrgyzstan after perestroika and the collapse of the Soviet Union in 1991. In their first documentaries and photographs they show the transition of their homeland, often focusing on the effect the communist state had on the lives and the sense of identity of the Kyrgyz people.

An important work, A New Silk Road: Algorithm of Survival and Hope from 2006, described as “anthropology as cultural critique”, is about the influence of the growing globalization along the historical Silk Road that winds through central Asia, from China to Europe (see One Belt, One Road).

== ArtEast ==
Both artists are curators for their cultural center ArtEast in Bishkek, having organized and curated the highly acclaimed Bishkek International Exhibition of Contemporary Art in 2005, 2007 and 2008. ArtEast has also schooled young Bishkek artists and serves as a forum for contemporary art. The curriculum has been sponsored by Arts Collaboratory and the Open Society Foundations. The prestigious Gwangju Biennale in South Korea invited the duo and their students to exhibit in the 2012 Round table edition. By mid 2014 however they refer to their art school in the past tense, citing economic hardships as the reason for its demise.

== Acclaim ==
In 2010, Kasmalieva and Djumaliev were honored with the Dutch Prince Claus Award for outstanding achievements in culture and development. The jury acknowledged "their path-breaking art practice, their important contributions to contemporary culture in Central Asia, and the chances they offer young artists." Also in 2010 they were shortlisted for the Artes Mundi Prize.

== Exhibitions ==
- 1988 Central Exhibition Hall — Tashkent, Uzbekistan
- 1988, 1997 and 2001 Fine Arts Museum — Frunze (Bishkek), Kyrgyzstan
- 1999 Gallery of Modern Art — Novosibirsk, Russia
- 2005 Venice Biennale, Central Asian Pavilion — Venice, Italy
- 2006, 2008, 2012, 2016 Winkleman Gallery — New York, USA
- 2006 Biennale of Sydney — Sydney, Australia
- 2007 Sharjah Biennial 8, Still Life: Art, Ecology, and the Politics of Change — United Arab Emirates
- 2007 Art Institute of Chicago (solo) — Chicago, USA
- 2009 Artes Mundi — Cardiff, United Kingdom
- 2009 MoMA (solo) film screening — New York, USA
- 2012 Maraya Art Centre, Migrasophia — Al Qasba, United Arab Emirates
- 2012 Gwangju Biennale 9: ROUNDTABLE — Gwangju, South Korea
- 2015 MoCA Taipei — Taipei, Taiwan
