= Zhanatay Shardenov =

Kazakh painter of 1970s and 1980s

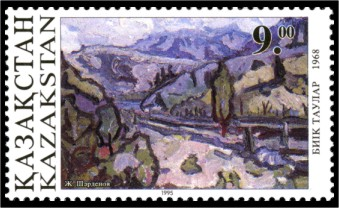
One of his works on 1995 stamp

Zhanatay Shardenov (Kazakh: Жаңатай Шәрденов, Jañatai Şärdenov; April 4, 1927 — March 29, 1992) was a Kazakh painter who specialized mostly on Kazakh landscapes.

He graduated from the Almaty art school in 1949, and from the Leningrad art institute in 1955.

Personal exhibitions of his art have been held since 1977, frequently outside the Soviet Union.

Shardenov was one of the most renowned Kazakh artists of the 1970s and 1980s.

In some sources, Shardenov was nicknamed the Kazakh Van Gogh.

He is among the top Kazakh 10 artists when listed by price of sold works.

His works include Central museum (1957), Zoo (1960), The Pond in the Park (1969), A work shift (1970), High up in the mountains (1972), Kapchagay sea (1976), The road to Medeo (1983), Portrait of T. Bigeldinov (1985), Evening melody (1988), and many others.

== Links ==
- Zhanatay Shardenov on Bonart.kz
