= List of largest art museums =

Art museums are some of the largest buildings in the world. The world's most pre-eminent museums have also engaged in various expansion projects through the years, expanding their total exhibition space.

== List ==
The following is a list of art museums ranked according to their gallery space where published by reliable sources. Only museums with more than 8,000 square meters (86,000 sq ft) of gallery space are included.

Rank	Building	Name	City	Country	Gallery space in m^{2} (ft^{2})	Year established
1		Louvre	Paris	France	72,735 (782,910)	1792
2		British Museum	London	United Kingdom	70,000 (753,000)	1753
3		State Hermitage Museum	Saint Petersburg	Russia	66,842 (719,480) (Note: The 100,000 square meters mentioned on the official website are the total exhibition area of the institution, which includes sites outside of St. Petersburg. The figure given here is the one that previously appeared on the official website, corresponding only to the site of Saint-Petersburg. Mention of this number appears on some websites, or in the book "Tourism in Russia: A Management Handbook" (p.158).)	1764
4		National Museum of China	Beijing	China	65,000 (700,000)	1959
5		Metropolitan Museum of Art	New York City	United States	58,800 (633,000)	1870
6		Vatican Museums	Vatican City (Rome)	Vatican City	43,000 (460,000)	1506
7		Grand Egyptian Museum	Giza	Egypt	40,000 (430,000)	2023
9		Victoria and Albert Museum	London	United Kingdom	30,658 (330,000) (Note: Does not include V&A Dundee, V&A East Museum and V&A East Storehouse, V&A Wedgwood Collection, or Young V&A)	1852
10		Rijksmuseum	Amsterdam	Netherlands	30,000 (320,000)	1800
11		Houston Museum of Fine Arts	Houston	United States	28,000 (300,000)	1900
12		National Museum of Korea	Seoul	South Korea	27,090 (291,600)	1909
13		Germanisches Nationalmuseum	Nuremberg	Germany	27,000 (290,000)	1852
14		Art Institute of Chicago	Chicago	United States	26,000 (280,000) (Note: 65,000 square feet expansion adds 30% of gallery space)	1879
14		Nanjing Museum	Nanjing	China	26,000 (280,000)	1933
16		National Gallery of Art	Washington, D.C.	United States	25,200 (271,000)	1937
17		Museo del Prado	Madrid	Spain	25,000 (270,000)	1819
18		Mystetskyi Arsenal	Kyiv	Ukraine	24,000 (260,000)	2006
18		National Museum of Anthropology	Mexico City	Mexico	24,000 (260,000)	1964
20		MASS MoCA	North Adams, Massachusetts	United States	23,000 (250,000)	1999
20		National Gallery of Australia	Canberra	Australia	23,000 (250,000)	1967
22		Art & History Museum	Brussels	Belgium	22,000 (240,000)	1835
22		Dia:Beacon	Beacon, New York	United States	22,000 (240,000)	2003
25		Museum of Fine Arts, Boston	Boston	United States	20,500 (221,000)	1870
26		Newark Museum of Art	Newark, New Jersey	United States	20,200 (217,000)	1909
27		Los Angeles County Museum of Art	Los Angeles	United States	20,000 (220,000)	1910
28		Shandong Art Museum	Jinan	China	19,700 (212,000)	1977
29		National Gallery of Victoria	Melbourne	Australia	19,600 (211,000)	1861
30		Israel Museum	Jerusalem	Israel	19,000 (200,000)	1965
31		Tokyo National Museum	Tokyo	Japan	18,567 (199,850)	1872
32		Pergamon Museum	Berlin	Germany	18,200 (196,000)	1910
33		Musée National d'Art Moderne	Paris	France	18,110 (194,900)	1947
34		National Gallery Singapore	Singapore	Singapore	18,000 (190,000)	2015
35		Minneapolis Institute of Art	Minneapolis	United States	17,500 (188,000)	1883
36	Olho Neimayer Curitiba 03 2007	Museu Oscar Niemeyer	Curitiba	Brazil	17,000 (180,000)	2002
36		M+	Kowloon	Hong Kong	17,000 (180,000)	2021
36		Arsenal (Biennale)	Venice	Italy	17,000 (180,000)	1895
36		Musée d'Orsay	Paris	France	17,000 (180,000)	1986
40		Indianapolis Museum of Art	Indianapolis	United States	16,600 (179,000)	1883
41		Denver Art Museum	Denver	United States	16,421 (176,750)	1918
42		Humboldt Forum	Berlin	Germany	16,000 (170,000)	2020
43		San Francisco Museum of Modern Art	San Francisco	United States	15,800 (170,000)	1935
44		Museum of Modern Art	New York City	United States	15,400 (166,000)	1929
45		Museo di Capodimonte	Naples	Italy	15,000 (160,000)	1757
46		Philadelphia Museum of Art	Philadelphia	United States	14,865 (160,010)	1876
47		Dallas Museum of Art	Dallas	United States	14,800 (159,000)	1903
48		Museo Reina Sofía	Madrid	Spain	14,756 (158,830) (Note: References for historical building + extension)	1992
49		Crystal Bridges Museum of American Art	Bentonville, Arkansas	United States	14,200 (153,000) (Note: The original 2011 facility comprises 93,000 square feet (8,600 square meters) of gallery space out of a total floor area of 200,000 square feet. The museum announced that its 2026 project will expand gallery space by 65% or about 60,000 square feet (5,600 square meters). Added to the existing gallery space, the expanded museum will offer 153,000 square feet of gallery and exhibition space, while the site's total building area will be over 300,000 square feet. These measurements exclude The Momentary, a contemporary art annex opened by Crystal Bridges in 2020, which offers 24,000 square feet of gallery space in a converted 63,000-square-foot former food processing plant in downtown Bentonville.)	2011
50		MMCA, Gwacheon	Gwacheon	South Korea	14,144 (152,240)	1969
51		Detroit Institute of Arts	Detroit	United States	14,000 (150,000)	1885
51		National Historical Museum	Sofia	Bulgaria	14,000 (150,000)	1973
51		Tokyo National Art Center	Tokyo	Japan	14,000 (150,000)	2007
51		Milwaukee Art Museum	Milwaukee	United States	14,000 (150,000)	1888
55		National Taiwan Museum of Fine Arts	Taichung	Taiwan	13,600 (146,000)	1988
56		National Gallery Prague (Veletržní)	Prague	Czech Republic	13,500 (145,000)	1796
57		Virginia Museum of Fine Arts	Richmond, Virginia	United States	13,200 (142,000)	1934
58		Bavarian National Museum	Munich	Germany	13,000 (140,000)	1855
58		Uffizi	Florence	Italy	13,000 (140,000)	1865
58		Capital Museum	Beijing	China	13,000 (140,000)	1981
58		Montreal Museum of Fine Arts	Montreal	Canada	13,000 (140,000)	1860
58		National Gallery	London	United Kingdom	13,000 (140,000) (Note: The Sainsbury Wing has 450,000 square feet of exhibition space (Victoria Newhouse, Towards a New Museum, 1998, Monacelli Press, p.182) and accounts for roughly a third of the museum)	1824
58		Palais de Tokyo	Paris	France	13,000 (140,000)	2001
58		Hamburger Kunsthalle	Hamburg	Germany	13,000 (140,000)	1869
58		National Museum of Norway	Oslo	Norway	13,000 (140,000)	1842
58		Salar Jung Museum	Hyderabad	India	13,000 (140,000)	1855
67		Museu Nacional d'Art de Catalunya	Barcelona	Spain	12,793 (137,700)	1934
68		National Archaeological Museum, Naples	Naples	Italy	12,650 (136,200)	1777
69		Tate Modern	London	United Kingdom	12,427 (133,760)	2000
69		Cleveland Museum of Art	Cleveland	United States	12,400 (133,000)	1913
71		National Gallery of Canada	Ottawa	Canada	12,400 (133,000)	1880
72		Staatsgalerie Stuttgart	Stuttgart	Germany	12,000 (130,000)	1843
72		Museum Boijmans Van Beuningen	Rotterdam	Netherlands	12,000 (130,000)	1849
72		National Gallery of Modern Art	New Delhi	India	12,000 (130,000)	1954
72		Palais des Beaux-Arts de Lille	Lille	France	12,000 (130,000)	1809
72		Pinakothek der Moderne	Munich	Germany	12,000 (130,000)	2002
72		Tretyakov Gallery (Krymsky Val)	Moscow	Russia	12,000 (130,000)	1985
78		Art Gallery of Ontario	Toronto	Canada	12,000 (129,000)	1900
79		Taipei Fine Arts Museum	Taipei	Taiwan	11,700 (126,000)	1983
80		Kunsthaus	Zurich	Switzerland	11,500 (124,000)	1910
80		Bode Museum	Berlin	Germany	11,500 (124,000)	1904
82		Art Gallery of New South Wales	Sydney	Australia	11,000 (120,000)	1874
82		Capitoline Museums	Rome	Italy	11,000 (120,000)	1471
82		Fondazione Prada	Milan	Italy	11,000 (120,000)	1993
82		Guggenheim Museum	Bilbao	Spain	11,000 (120,000)	1997
82		Perez Art Museum Miami	Miami	United States	11,000 (120,000) (Note: According to Handel Architects, the total programmable space for the Perez Art Museum in Miami is up to 200,000 square feet, but the interior of the building is 120,000 square feet, while the exterior space is 80,000 square feet.)	2013
82		Shaanxi History Museum	Xi'an	China	11,000 (120,000)	1991
88		HangarBicocca	Milan	Italy	10,900 (117,000)	2012
89		Tibet Museum	Lhasa	China	10,500 (113,000)	1999
90		Portland Art Museum	Portland, Oregon	United States	10,400 (112,000)	1892
91		Museum of Fine Arts, Budapest	Budapest	Hungary	10,300 (111,000)	1906
92		National September 11 Memorial & Museum	New York City	United States	10,000 (110,000)	2014
92		Antonino Salinas Regional Archeological Museum	Palermo	Italy	10,000 (110,000)	1866
92		Regional Museum Accascina	Messina	Italy	10,000 (110,000)	1806
92		Carnegie Museum of Art	Pittsburgh	United States	10,000 (110,000)	1896
92		Hamburger Bahnhof	Berlin	Germany	10,000 (110,000)	1996
92		Kunstmuseum Basel	Basel	Switzerland	10,000 (110,000)	1936
92		MAXXI	Rome	Italy	10,000 (110,000)	2010
92		Museo Egizio	Turin	Italy	10,000 (110,000)	1824
92		Museum Kunstpalast	Düsseldorf	Germany	10,000 (110,000)	1913
92		MMCA, Seoul	Seoul	South Korea	10,000 (110,000)	2013
92		Saint Louis Art Museum	St. Louis	United States	10,000 (110,000)	1881
92		Tel Aviv Museum of Art	Tel Aviv	Israel	10,000 (110,000) (Note: 5,000 square meters original exhibition space, doubled by extension)	1932
104		National Palace Museum	Taipei	Taiwan	9,613 (103,470)	1925
105		Mimara Museum	Zagreb	Croatia	9,453.79 (101,759.7)	1980
106		Almaty Museum of Arts	Almaty	Kazakhstan	9,400 (101,000)	2025
107		National Archaeological Museum	Madrid	Spain	9,300 (100,000)	1867
107		Lucas Museum of Narrative Art	Los Angeles	United States	9,300 (100,000)	2026
109		Musée Fabre	Montpellier	France	9,200 (99,000)	1828
110		Pinacoteca do Estado de São Paulo	São Paulo	Brazil	9,112 (98,080)	1905
111		Bardo National Museum	Tunis	Tunisia	9,000 (97,000)	1888
111		Cité de l'Architecture et du Patrimoine	Paris	France	9,000 (97,000)	1879
111		National Gallery	Oslo	Norway	9,000 (97,000)	1842
111		Museum Ludwig	Cologne	Germany	9,000 (97,000)	1976
111		Power Station of Art	Shanghai	China	9,000 (97,000)	2012
116	M. H. de Young Memorial Museum	De Young Museum	San Francisco	United States	8,919 (96,000)	1895
117		Smithsonian American Art Museum	Washington, D.C.	United States	8,800 (95,000)	1829
118		Musée du quai Branly	Paris	France	8,750 (94,200)	2006
119	150xframeless	High Museum of Art	Atlanta	United States	8,714 (93,800)	1905
120		Louvre Abu Dhabi	Abu Dhabi	United Arab Emirates	8,600 (93,000)	2017
121		Liaoning Provincial Museum	Shenyang	China	8,500 (91,000)	1949
122		Gallerie di Piazza Scala	Milan	Italy	8,300 (89,000)	2011
122		National Art Museum of China	Beijing	China	8,300 (89,000)	1958
123		Crocker Art Museum	Sacramento, California	United States	8,200 (88,000)	1885
124		San Antonio Museum of Art	San Antonio	United States	8,130 (87,500)	1981
125		Gemäldegalerie	Berlin	Germany	8,000 (86,000)	1830
125		National Archaeological Museum	Athens	Greece	8,000 (86,000)	1866
125		Neues Museum	Berlin	Germany	8,000 (86,000)	1855
125		Petit Palais	Paris	France	8,000 (86,000)	1902
125		Stedelijk Museum	Amsterdam	Netherlands	8,000 (86,000)	1874
125	Entry of Sprengel Museum, Hannover	Sprengel Museum	Hanover	Germany	8,000 (86,000)	1979

== Future ==
The following is a list of art museums projected to offer at least 8,000 square meters (86,000 sq ft) of gallery space in the future or increase their current gallery space, following construction, expansion, or renovation.

Building	Name	City	Country	Projected total gallery space in m^{2} (ft^{2})	Project type	Planned completion
	KANAL – Centre Pompidou	Brussels	Belgium	12,500 (135,000)	New museum	November 2026
	Guggenheim Abu Dhabi	Abu Dhabi	United Arab Emirates	31,000 (330,000) (Note: This figure incorporates 13,000 square meters for special exhibitions and 18,000 square metres for the permanent collection.)	New museum	December 2026
	Toledo Museum of Art	Toledo	United States	11,600 (125,000)	Expansion	2027
	Virginia Museum of Fine Arts	Richmond	United States	19,000 (205,000) (Note: The new building's total footprint will be 173,000 square feet, which includes 63,000 square feet of permanent collection and temporary exhibition galleries.)	Expansion	2029
	Metropolitan Museum of Art	New York	United States	60,900 (656,000) (Note: The museum has announced that the new Oscar L. and H.M. Agnes Hsu-Tang Wing will increase gallery space for the display of modern and contemporary art to reach 71,000 square feet. Since the current wing comprises 48,000 square feet of gallery space, it means that the new wing set to replace it will effectively add 23,000 square feet of new gallery space to the museum.)	Expansion	2030

== See also ==
- List of art museums
- List of most-visited art museums
- List of national museums
- List of single-artist museums
