= Aisha Galimbaeva =

Kazakhstani painter and educator (1917–2008)

- Born: Aisha Garifkyzy Galimbaeva; 29 December 1917; Issyk, Almaty Province, Kazakhstan
- Died: 21 April 2008 (aged 90); Almaty Province, Kazakhstan
- Education: All Union State Cinematography Institute, Moscow; N.V. Gogol Art College, Almaty
- Known for: Painter
- Movement: Orientalist

Aisha Garifkyzy Galimbaeva (Kazakh: Aişa Ğarifqyzy Ğalymbaeva; December 29, 1917, in Issyk, Almaty Province – April 21, 2008) was a Kazakhstani painter and educator. She is noted for her colourful and realistic depictions of women's changing position in the Soviet Bloc in the mid-20th century.

== Life and career ==
Aisha Galimbaeva was born in 1917 in the village of Issyk in the Almaty Province of Kazakhstan. She demonstrated an aptitude for drawing and painting at an early age. She received her artistic education with artists L.P. Leontev, A.I. Bortnikov, and A.M. Cherkassy. By the age of 17 had received her diploma from the N.V. Gogol Art College in Almaty. She graduated from Almaty Art School in 1943 and worked at the АН-Union State Cinematography Institute in Moscow.

After studying decorative art at the All Union State Cinematography Institute in Moscow, she returned to her native province where she focused almost exclusively on what she called “pure painting”. These were works that often depicted themes of national identity. She saw beauty and interest in everyday life of Kazakhstan's people, especially women and family life.

She taught at the Alma Ata Art College and the Graphics and Art department of the Kazakh State Abai Pedagogical Institute. She was a member of the Union of Artists of Kazakhstan from 1951 and always took an active interest in the artistic life and community of her native land. She died in Almaty in 2008.

== Awards and recognition ==
She was the first Kazakhstan artist to be recognised professionally and became a National Artist of Kazakh SSR. Galimbayeva’s honors and awards include the title Peoples’ Artist of the Kazakh SSR, the Order the Badge of Honor and the Order of the Red Banner of Labor.

== Work ==
The artist mainly worked in oils. Her paintings, which was mainly executed during the 1950s, addressed issues of home, family and work. Her paintings capture the rich texture of her native land and its people, with a particular focus on women, and their changing social role. Her works have been described as possessing "socialist Realist content."

=== Select list of paintings ===
Paintings

- Textile Factory Workers, c. 1951
- Romantic still-life, date unknown
- The Happy Day,
- Song of Kazakhstan

Publications

- Kazakh Folk Costumes, 1958
