= Almagul Menlibayeva =

Kazakhstani artist and curator (born 1969)

Almagul Menlibayeva is a multimedia artist based in Kazakhstan and Germany. Her work comprises photography, multi-channel video, and mixed-media installations that engages with social and ecological issues in Central Asia. Her artistic practice focuses on decolonial reimaginings of gender, environmental degradation, as well as Eurasian nomadic and indigenous cosmologies and mythologies, highlighting geopolitical realities that shape the contemporary Kazakhstan.

Menlibayeva has been exhibited internationally at the Sydney Biennale, the Venice Biennale, Museum van Hedendaagse Kunst, Antwerp, Queens Museum, Queens, and The Stenersen Museum, Oslo, among others.

== Early life and education ==
Menlibayeva was born in 1969 in Almaty, Kazakhstan. She obtained her MFA degree from Academy of Art and Theatre, Almaty in 1992. From 1987 to 1995, she was a member of the Almaty underground young artists group Green Triangle, and participated in its first underground exhibitions. She was a student at the private studio of Gani Bayanov from 1984 to 1985, and a student at The Palace of Pioneers run by artist Sergei Maslov from 1985 to 1987. Her educational background in the Soviet avant-garde school of Futurism allowed her to bridge the past and present, as well as tradition and innovation, in her creative journey.

== Works ==
=== Notable works ===
==== Transoxiana Dreams (2011) ====
Transoxiana Dreams explores the social, economical, and ecological issues surrounding the lives of the Araikum generation – the term used to call the people living in the vast region of the rapidly receding Aral Sea coastline. The deteriorating environment is caused by the radical irrigation policies of the former Soviet Union in the 1960s – between Soviet, Uzbekistan, Tajikistan, and southwestern Kazakhstan.

A dreamy, surrealistic mixture of documentary and fantasy, Transoxiana Dreams explores the desertification through the eyes of a fisherman's daughter as the main protagonist. The girl's father encounters strange mythical female creatures during his journey as he ventures for new fishing grounds – scarce leftover of what once was Aral Sea. The mythical creatures – derived from Greek's mythological figure, the Centaur, was chosen as according to legend, upon their initial meeting, the ancient Greeks mistook the nomads of Transoxianian Steppes on their horses as mythological.

Transoxiana Dreams won the main award at Kino der Kunst 2013 – an international film festival hosted in Munich, Germany.

==== Milk for Lambs (2010) ====
The visual of this 11:35 minute video installation is composed of alternating black-and-white and color frames. Milk for Lambs straddles the line between contemporary Kazakhstan and its mythically infused historic ritual. Set against the vast landscape of the steppe, it traces what's left of Tengriism – where the skygod Tengri is the main deity and his wife, Umai, the all-nurturing mother goddess of the Turkic Siberians. The film follows the former nomads as they celebrate the festivities held in honor of Tengri and Umai, and the accompanying rituals.

Milk for Lambs won KfW Audience Award of the Videonale 13: Festival for Contemporary Art in Kunstmuseum, Bonn.

==== Kissing Totems (2008) ====
Kissing Totems is the first solo exhibition Almagul Menlibayeve held in the United States, and the title of the solo exhibition is one of her recent works in 2008 with the same name.

In her film, “Kissing Totems”, it is about a set of surrealist actions and impossible encounters happened on the territory of a deserted factory from the Soviet era. The industrial ruin of Communism has become a stage, a kind of bird, also a totem and peris which mark the transition of dream-narrative. By invoking confounding feelings and curiosity, the artist asks audiences to watch the film through the eyes of a little girl, the audiences observe the unbelievable thing by contemplative detachment. When the little girl walks through the past symbol of Communism, from camera to industrial materialism of industry. At the same time, the little girl feels comfy with two symbol systems. Through her imagine gaze, the post-communism becomes another totemic myth that being occupied by ideologies and the newly revived beliefs.

==== On the Road (2007) ====
One the Road is one of Almagul Menlibayeve's artworks blends in poetry into video and performance that being presented in a unique setting as brings topic of Islamic cultural tradition and contemporary art together. The following is her own artist statement towards On the Road:

My educational background is in the Soviet Russian avant-garde school of Futurism, which I combine with a nomadic aesthetic of post-Soviet, contemporary Kazakhstan – something that I have been exploring in recent years through my photographic and video work. I use specific ways of expression in modern and contemporary art as a vehicle to investigate my personal archaic atavism as a certain mystical anthropomorphism. In other words, I explore the nature of a specific Egregore, a shared cultural psychic experience, which manifests itself as a specific thought-form among the people(s) of the ancient, arid and dusty Steppes between the Caspian Sea, Baikonur and Altai in today’s Kazakhstan. In the Russian language, Archaic Atavism is personalized as a being, which points to and creates a different meaning. We are not just speaking about an idea or archaic element in the collective subconscious of a people, but about the embodiment of our archaic atavism that becomes an active entity, just like a creature itself. Our archaic atavism is not just internalized, but also externalized. It is as if he has been awakened by the post-Soviet experience of the indigenous Kazakh people, who are becoming their own after 80 years of Soviet domination and cultural genocide. Suddenly he (Archaic Atavism) became interested in enculturation and in behavioral modernity. He also began to have entertaining dialogues with the transnational circulation of ideas in contemporary art. For this dialogue, I have chosen the medium of video and photography and like to work with the notion of memory and reality. My archaic atavism is interested in my video explorations in the Steppes and in post-Soviet Asia. By editing raw data and combining documentary and staged footage, I become his voice, enabling a cultural eхоdus from long oblivion. My work raises metaphysical questions such as who am I? And where shall I go? This (psychic) experience and perspective marks my artistic language.

— Almagul Menlibayeva

== Selected solo exhibitions ==
- 2025: I Understand Everything, Almaty Museum of Arts, Kazakhstan
- 2018: Inverted Worlds, Neues MuseumVerkehrte Welt
- 2018: Videoart at Midnight #98, Berlin #98: Almagul Menlibayeva
- 2018: Green, Yellow, Red, TSE Art Destination
- 2016–2017:Transformation, 11, Grand Palais
- 2015: 56th Venice Biennial, Collateral project Union of Fire and Water, 11 video installation Fire talks to me, commissioned by Yarat Art Foundation, Palaco Barbaro, Venice, Italy
- 2014: Transoxiana Dreams, Videozone, Ludwig Forum, Aachen, Germany
- 2013: Empire of the Memory, Ethnographic Museum, Warsaw, Polland
- 2013: An Odd tor the Wastelands and Gulags, Kunstraum Innsbruck, Austria
- 2012: Daughters of Turan, Casal Solleric, La Palma De Mallorca, Spain
- 2011: Exodus, Nassauischer Kunstverein Wiesbaden, Wiesbaden, Germany
- 2010: Les rêves perdus d'Aral, Galerie Albert Benamou, Paris, France
- 2010: Transoxiana Dreams, Priska C. Juschka Fine Art, New York, NY; My Silk Road to you, Tengri-Umai Gallery, Almaty, Kazakhstan
- 2010: Lonely at the Top, Europe at large #6 (Refrains from the Wasteland), Museum van Hedendaagse Kunst (M HKA), Antwerp, Belgium EUROPE AT LARGE
- 2009: Daughters of Turan, Priska C. Juschka Fine Art, New York, NY
- 2009: Exodus, Tengri-Umai Gallery, Almaty, Kazakhstan; Kurban, Priska C. Juschka Fine Art, New York, NY; 2008 Kissing Totems, Priska C. Juschka Fine Art, New York, NY
- 2007: On the Road, Galerie Davide Gallo, Berlin, Germany

== Awards and grants ==
- 1995 Grand Prix, Asia Art, 2nd Central Asian Biennale, Tashkent, Uzbekistan.
- 1996 Daryn, State Youth Prize, Kazakhstan;
- 2002 Second prize, 1st Video Festival, the Soros Center for Contemporary Art, Almaty Tarlan Annual National Independent Prize of the Philanthropists’ Club of Kazakhstan, Almaty;
- 2003 Tarlan, Prize for Young Artist, commissioned by Independent Entrepreneurs of Kazakhstan;
- 2004 Third prize, Videoidentity:Sacred Places of Kazakhstan, Video Festival, Soros Center for Contemporary Art, Almaty
- 2009 First Prize, Zolotoy Buben [Golden Tambourine], 13th International Festival of Television Programs and Films, Khanty-Mansiysk, Russia
- 2010 Prize de la Nuit Award, 8th International Festival Signes de Nuit, Paris;
- 2011 Culture Network Program Grant, OpenSociety Institute, Budapest;
- 2011 KfW Audience Award, VIDEONALE 13: Festival for Contemporary Art, Kunstmuseum Bonn, Bonn Art
- 2013 Main Award, KINO DER KUNST International Film Festival, Munich;
- 2017 She received from Ministry of Culture of France Chevalier Ordre des Arts et des Lettres
