= Rustam Khalfin =

Kazakh artist, painter and architect

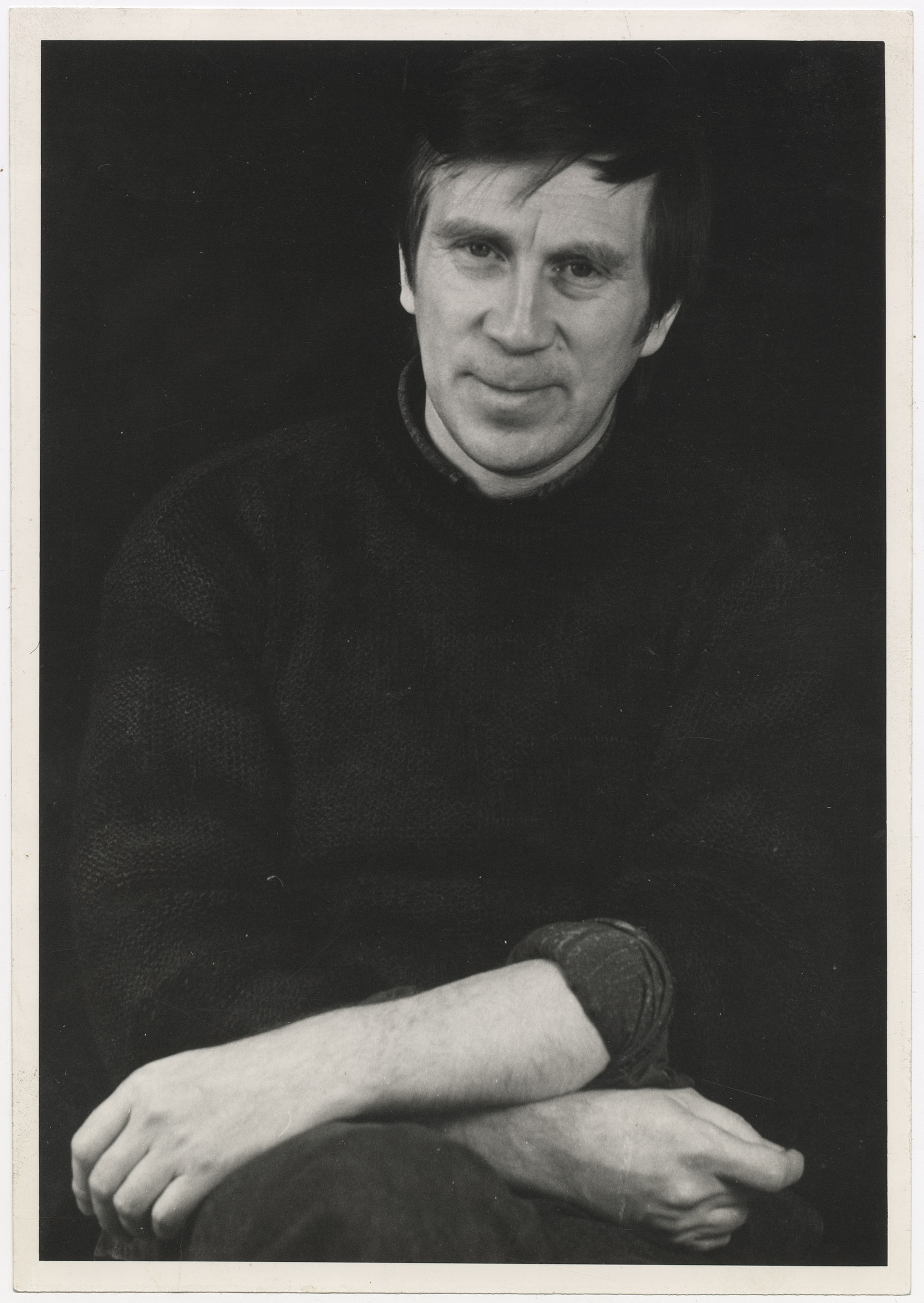
- Born: October 14, 1949
- Tashkent, Uzbek SSR
- Died: December 31, 2008 (aged 59)
- Almaty, Kazakhstan
- Nationality: USSR (until 1991), Kazakhstan (since 1991)
- Alma mater: Moscow Architectural Institute
- Movement: Contemporary Art
- Style: Painting, Video Art, Photo Art, Installation Art, Performance Art
- Website: https://khalfin.foundation
- Archive: https://look-gallery.com/en

Rustam Khalfin (Russian: Рустам Нурмухамедович Хальфин, Kazakh: Рустам Хальфин) (October 14, 1949 – December 31, 2008) was a Kazakh contemporary artist, painter and architect.

Rustam Khalfin is considered one of the most influential artists of Central Asia of the 20th century, he was one of the pioneers in performance, installation and video art and had a major influence on the art community of the region. He developed the concept of nomad aesthetics with contemporary vision.

== Background ==
Born in 1949 in Tashkent in the family of a battle-front veteran Nurmukhamed Abdrakhmanovich Khalfin (1909 – 1974). Rustam's brother Marat Nurmukhamedovich Khalfin was a Soviet and Russian scientist (years of life: 1940 – 2020).

In 1950, Rustam and his family moved to Alma-Ata, Kazakh SSR, where he spent his life.

In 1972 he graduated from the Moscow Architectural Institute.

He was a student of Vladimir Sterligov, a prominent representative of the Russian avant-garde, and throughout the 1970s and 1990s he was a member of his circle of successors who developed the “chalice-dome consciousness” theory.

In 1999 he opened his own LOOK gallery.

In 2005, Khalfin's works were exhibited in the Central Asia Pavilion at the prestigious Venice Biennale, it was the moment when Kazakhstani contemporary art was presented to the world for the first time.

Rustam's wife and muse was the artist Lidia Blinova, together they regularly held "apartment" shows.

== Creative Legacy ==
Today we know about three thousand artifacts that are part of Rustam Khalfin's heritage: paintings, installations, drawings, photographs, texts and much more.

Among the major and well-known projects of the artist: “Eurasian Utopia”, (including “Clay Project”, “Lazy Project”), “Northern Barbarians”. Khalfin started working on the monumental installation “Clay Project. Level Zero” in 1999. The installation consisted of an 18-meter human figure which extended over two stories. For Khalfin, this project was a metaphor for "the disconnectedness of people in today's world, and in particular the [Almaty] artistic community”. According to Khalfin's idea, the installation was supposed to “call for consolidation, understanding the situation in contemporary art and developing a strategy that could introduce Kazakhstan to the international cultural community”. Rustam Khalfin created the concept of “pulotas” – a simultaneous combination of emptiness and fullness. This word refers to a simple plastic object formed between fingers clenched into a fist - it does not matter if it is air or a piece of clay. His works are kept in the State Tretyakov Gallery (Russia), the Zimmerli Art Museum in New Jersey (USA), the M HKA Museum of Contemporary Art (Belgium), the A. Kasteyev State Museum of Arts in Almaty, the National Museum of Kazakhstan in Astana, as well as in other museums and private collections.

Alexander Brener, artist and writer, wrote about Khalfin in his book “The Lives of The Murdered Artists”: “Rustam entered the painting art not as a handicraft and self-taught, but as a student of a powerful modernist tradition - Cezanne and Seurat, Braque and Picasso, Malevich and Sterligov, Robert Delaunay and Serge Poliakoff, Nicolas de Staël and Giorgio Morandi. Rustam called this line “plastic form making” and considered it the most important phenomenon in the new fine arts. “Plasticity” was his favorite concept. By plasticity, he understood the combination of the primary, simplest tactile experience with intelligent vision, with an educated eye”

== Exhibitions ==
His works have been featured in prestigious exhibitions such as the Central Asia Pavilion at the 51st Venice Biennale (2005), Off the Silk Road: No Mad's Land, Haus der Kulturen der Welt, Berlin (2002) and re-orientation: Kunst zu Mittelasien, ACC Gallery, Weimar (2002).

Major exhibitions:

1981 – “Exhibition of Four”, in the apartment of Lydia Blinova and Rustam Khalfin, Almaty, Kazakhstan.

1982 – “1+1+1+1”, The Union of Architects, Almaty, Kazakhstan.

1985 – “Rustam Khalfin. Paintings”, art studio of T.N. Glebova, Leningrad, USSR.

1986 – “Exhibition of Unofficial Art”, Directorship for Art Exhibitions, Almaty, Kazakhstan.

1988 – “Sterligov, his pupils and followers”, Directorship for the Museum Association of Leningrad Oblast, Leningrad, USSR.

1989 – “Art Center”, Directorship for Art Exhibitions, Almaty, Kazakhstan. “Crossing”, Directorship of Art Exhibitions, Almaty, Kazakhstan.

1990 – “Sterligov’s Group”, Museum of City’s History”, Leningrad, USSR.

1991 – “Exhibition of Soviet Paintings”, Adelaida, Australia. “7+1”, exhibition hall of Arkhangelsk Artists’ Union, Arkhangelsk, USSR. “Sterligov’s Group”, Yusupov Palace, Leningrad, USSR. “Modern artists for Malevich”, State Tretyakov Gallery, Moscow, USSR.

1992 – “Artists’ quarter”, Directorship for Art Exhibitions, Almaty, Kazakhstan. “Art-Contact”, “Manezh” Central Exhibition Hall, St.Petersburg, Russia. “Towards Malevich’s side”, Karenin Gallery, Vienna, Austria

1994 – “Hand and Eye”, personal exhibition, “Studio 20” Gallery, Moscow, Russia. “Petersburg Bienniale”, “Manezh” Central Exhibition Hall, St.Petersburg, Russia.

1995 – “A Parade of Galleries”, presentation of the “Iskander” Gallery, Kasteev State Museum of Art, Almaty, Kazakhstan. “Erotica and Astrology”, “Ulasu-Art” Gallery, Almaty, Kazakhstan.

1996 – “Art in private collections”, Central State Museum of History, Almaty, Kazakhstan. Exhibition-presentation of 10 catalogs of Kazakhstani artists, “Tengri’Umai” Gallery, Almaty, Kazakhstan. “Postman’s Song”, KazakhBusiness Club, Almaty, Kazakhstan. In honor of L.B., Rukh Gallery, Gallery Parade-96, A. Kasteyev State Museum of Arts, Almaty.

1997 – “Paintings by Rustam Khalfin and sculpture by Georgi Tryakin-Buharov”, “Asia Art” Gallery, Almaty, Kazakhstan. “Through form”, Art Museum, Samara, Russia. “Skin of an artist”, “A Parade of Galleries”, Kasteev State Museum of Arts, Almaty, Kazakhstan. “Art-Disckurs-97”, Observatory in the foothills of Zailiiski Alatau Mountains, Kazakhstan. “Human Rights: Terra Incognita”. KazakhBusiness Club, Almaty, Kazakhstan. “Human Rights: A Second Breath”, KazakhBusiness Club, Almaty, Kazakhstan.

1998 – “Towards understanding boundaries”, “A Parade of Galleries”, “Asia Art” Gallery, Kasteev State Museum of Modern Art, Almaty, Kazakhstan. First Annual Exhibition of the Soros center for Contemporary Art “Self-identification: Futurological prognosis”, “Moscow” Shopping Center, Almaty, Kazakhstan. “Flying White” presentation, Art Museum, Karaganda, Kazakhstan.

1999 – “Extreme defile”, “LOOK” Gallery, Almaty, Kazakhstan. “The Zero Level. Clay Project. ”, “LOOK” Gallery, Almaty, Kazakhstan. “Rustam Khalfin’s Birthday”, presentation by the “LOOK” Gallery, Almaty, Kazakhstan. “Eurasian Zone”, “Manezh” Central Exhibition Hall, Moscow, Russia

2000 – “Art Moscow 2000”, Central House of Artists, Moscow, Russia.

2001 – “Media City” festival, Windsor, Canada. “New acquisitions from Central Asia”, Zimmerly Museum, New Jersey, USA. “First Bienniale in Valencia”, Valencia, Spain.

2002 – “No mad’s land”, House of World Cultures, Berlin, Germany. Videoart Festival of the Soros Center for Contemporary Art “Inventory”, German Theater, Almaty, Kazakhstan. “Re-orientation”, ACC Gallery, Weimar, Germany. International Festival of Arts “Tengri-Umai”, Almaty, Kazakhstan.

2003 – Nordic Nomads, CAC Contemporary Art Centre, Vilnius.

2005 – «Rustam Khalfin. Personal exhibition». Tengri-Umai Gallery, Almaty.

2007 – Rustam Khalfin. Retrospective. Love Races, White Space Gallery in St Peter’s, London Intim – In Time, Soros Center for Contemporary Art, Almaty.

2016 – Eurasian Utopia, NCCA (National Centre for Contemporary Arts), Moscow.

2020 – Rustam Khalfin. Self-Portrait Without A Mirror. A. Kasteyev State Museum of Arts of the Republic of Kazakhstan.

Curatorial projects:

1996 – “The Autumn gestures of anger. dedicated to the memory of L. Blinova”, KazakhBusiness Club, Almaty, Kazakhstan.

1997 – “Skin of an artist”, “A Parade of Galleries”, Kasteev State Museum of Arts, Almaty, Kazakhstan. “Lazy Project”, Observatory in the foothills of Zailiiski Alatau Mountains, Kazakhstan.

1998 – “Big Glass. Towards realization of the boundaries”, “A Parade of Galleries”, Kasteev State Museum of Arts, Almaty, Kazakhstan.

1999-2000 – “The Zero level. Clay Project”, “LOOK” Gallery, Almaty, Kazakhstan.

2000 – Member of the curator group for the Second Annual Exhibition of the Soros Center for Contemporary Art “Communications: Experience of Interaction”, Almaty, Kazakhstan.

Awards: 1974 – Diploma for participation in designing of Buildings on the republic’s Square in Almaty from All-USSR Meeting of Young Architects, Moscow, Russia.

1999 – Third Prize (together with G. Tryakin-Buharov and L. Turganbaeva) from the First Annual Exhibition of SCCA “Self-identification: Futurological prognosis”, Almaty, Kazakhstan.

== Heritage Protection ==
In 2021, Ruslan Khalfin, the artist’s nephew and heir, founded the Rustam Khalfin Public Kazakhstani Foundation. The Foundation’s goal is to preserve and study Rustam Khalfin’s oeuvre. It is managed by the board of trustees made up of high-profile and well-known specialists in Kazakhstan.

All rights to the heritage of the artist Rustam Khalfin belong to the heir Ruslan Khalfin.

=== Memories about the artist Rustam Khalfin ===
Rustam Khalfin began as a follower of the Sterligov School and later created his unique additional element in art, linking global contemporary art with the culture of Kazakhstan. His innovation and influence on art were discussed in an interview by his colleague, prominent performance artist Valery Kostrin, and Roza Abenova, curator, gallerist and ex-head of the Center for Contemporary Art of the National Museum of the Republic of Kazakhstan. The Video on YouTube was posted on Rustam Khalfin's official channel in March 2024.

In the interview, Valery Kostrin and Roza Abenova discuss Rustam Khalfin's impact on contemporary art in Kazakhstan and Central Asia. They highlight his role in the avant-garde of new technologies and his connection to the Sterligov School, founded by Kazimir Malevich's student Vladimir Sterligov. Kostrin describes how Khalfin, with his deep knowledge of architecture and painting, introduced his additional element in art, reaching a level of almost abstract cosmic expression. Khalfin, being an architect, excelled in drawing and spoke about continuing the avant-garde through the Sterligov School, which inspired and expanded the horizons of his creativity.

== Online Archive of Rustam Khalfin's Creative Legacy ==
On March 12, 2024, in Kazakhstan, Ruslan Khalfin launched an online archive of the artist Rustam Khalfin's creative legacy, titled LOOK Gallery. The archive contains over 900 digitized images, including paintings and graphic works, personal photographs of the artist, video art, photographs of environments, installations, and performances. The archive also features business correspondence, little-known articles, and unpublished texts by the artist. As of today, around 3,000 artifacts have been digitized, and after attribution, they will be included in the artist's online archive.

This archive is of great interest to professionals in the field of contemporary art, young artists, students of specialized universities, and the general public. It was created as a result of a two-year effort by the Rustam Khalfin Heritage Foundation to collect, systematize, and digitize data. The archive covers materials from the 1980s to 2008, and work on it will continue.

The archive is named LOOK Gallery in honor of the gallery founded by Rustam Khalfin in 1999, where the artist created his installations, projects, and performances. The archive is available in Kazakh, Russian, and English.

The opening of the archive is accompanied by plans to further popularize and promote Rustam Khalfin's work on the international art scene. In 2025, the new Almaty Museum of Arts plans to release a monograph on his work and open an exhibition of his works in the museum's permanent collection.

== Literature ==
1. Zitta Sultanbaeva/Asya Nuriyeva. Art Atmosphere of Alma-Ata – Almaty, 2016. ISBN 978-601-7283-29-2 2. Rustam Khalfin Seeing Through the Artist’s Hand - White Space Gallery London 2007. ISBN 978-0-9557394-0-8 3. Alexander Brener. The Lives of The Murdered Artists – Moscow, 2017. ISBN 978-5-87987-110-4
