= Said Atabekov =

Kazakhstani artist

- Born: 1965 (age 60–61); Bes Terek
- Known for: Installation, performance and video art, and photography
- Movement: Kyzyl Traktor (Red Tractor)
- Awards: Prince Claus Award (2011)

Said Atabekov is a Kazakhstani artist in the fields of installation, performance and video art, and photography.

== Life ==
Atabekov was born in 1965 in Bes Terek in the Tashkent Province of Uzbekistan. After his studies at the Shymkent Art College, he continued with the education of upcoming artists and the organization of exhibits of their work.

He began his career when the introduction of perestroika in the Soviet Union which enabled him to make use of the enlarged possibilities of artistic freedom. In this time he founded the collective Kyzyl Traktor (Red Tractor) and experimented with international modernism.

In course of history, his region had been under influence of four strong and often conflicting ideologies: nomadic pantheism, islam, Russian influences and western capitalism. The deeper paradoxes of them can repeatedly be seen in his work, such as from the time of Genghis Khan, during communism and in the time following the dissolution of the Soviet Union.

In 2011 Atabekov was honored with a Prince Claus Award.

== Work (selection) ==
- 2004: Ifa gallery, Berlin, Vom roten Stern zur blauen Kuppel
- 2005: Ifa galerie, Stuttgart, Vom roten Stern zur blauen Kuppel
- 2005: 51st Venice Biennale, The Experience of Art
- 2007: Kiasma Museum of Modern Art, Helsinki, Time of the Storytellers
- 2007: Biennale de Montréal
- 2008: Yerba Buena Center for the Arts, San Francisco, Tracing Roads Through Central Asia
- 2008: Winkleman Gallery, New York I Dream of the Stans: New Central Asian Video
- 2008: ArteEast, Bishkek, Boom Boom - 4th Bishkek International Exhibition of Contemporary Art
- 2009: Kunsthalle Exnergasse, Vienna, Changing Climate
- 2009: Musée du Quai Branly, Paris, Photoquai
- 2011: Museum of Modern Art, Antwerp, Collection XXVII - East from 4°24' MuHKA
- 2011: 54th Venice Biennale, Central Asian Pavilion
- 2011: New Museum of Contemporary Art, New York, Ostalgia
- 2011: 42nd Photo Festival Mannheim-Ludwigshafen-Heidelberg The eye is a lonely hunter: images of humankind
- 2011: Calvert22, London, Between Heaven and Earth: Contemporary Art from the Centre of Asia
- 2011:Between Heaven and Earth - Contemporary Art from the Centre of Asia - Calvert22 Foundation, London, England
- 2011:4 st Fotofestival Mannheim Ludwigshafen_HeidelbergTHE EYE IS A LONELY HUNTER, Germany
- 2011:Biennale di Venezia - 54th International Art Exhibition - La Biennale di Venezia, Venice
- 2011:Ostalgia - New Museum of Contemporary Art, New York City, NY
- 2011:Moving Image" An Art Fair of Contemporary Video Art New York, NY
- 2012:Migrasophia - Maraya Art Centre - Barjeel Art Foundation, Sharjah
- 2012:The Eye is a Lonely Hunter – Images of Human Kind - Grimmuseum, Berlin
- 2012: Centro Videoinsight - Torino, Italy
- 2013:No-mad-nes In No Man's Land - Eslite Gallery, Taipei
- 2103:5th Moscow Biennale of Contemporary Art - Bolshe Sveta / More Light - Manege Central Exhibition Hall, Moscow
- 2013:Primera Bienal del Sur en Panamá
- 2013: Emplazando Mundos - Bienal del Sur en Panamá, Panama City
- 2013:At the Crossroads: Contemporary Art from the Caucasus and Central Asia - Sotheby´s - London, New Bond Street, London, England
- 2013:The Eye is a Lonely Hunter - Images of Humankind - Fotogalleriet, Oslo
- 2013:ONE STEP/PE FORWARD Contemporary art exhibition of Kazakhstan's artists in Venice, Italy
- 2014:Il Piedistallo vuoto. Fantasmi dall’Est Europa - Museo Civico Archeologico di Bologna, Bologna
- 2014:ArtDubai, UAE
