= William Boothby (disambiguation) =

William Boothby (1829–1903) was an Electoral Commissioner for South Australia.

William Boothby may also refer to:

- William "Cocktail" Boothby, American bartender and writer
- Sir William Boothby, 1st Baronet (c. 1638–1707), of the Boothby baronets
- Sir William Boothby, 3rd Baronet (1664–1731), of the Boothby baronets
- Sir William Boothby, 4th Baronet (1721–1787), major-general, of the Boothby baronets
- Sir William Boothby, 7th Baronet (1746–1824), of the Boothby baronets
- Sir William Boothby, 8th Baronet (1782–1846), Receiver General of Customs at the Port of London, of the Boothby baronets

== See also ==
- Boothby (surname)
