= Brooke Boothby =

Brooke Boothby may refer to:

- Sir Brooke Boothby, 6th Baronet (1744–1824), British poet and friend of Jean-Jacques Rousseau
- Rev. Brooke Boothby (clergyman), son of the 7th Baronet, father of the second wife of George Venables-Vernon, 5th Baron Vernon
- Sir Brooke Boothby, 10th Baronet (1856–1913), British diplomat

== See also ==
- Boothby (surname)
