= Boothby baronets of Broadlow Ash (1660) =

Escutcheon of the Boothby baronets of Broadlow Ash

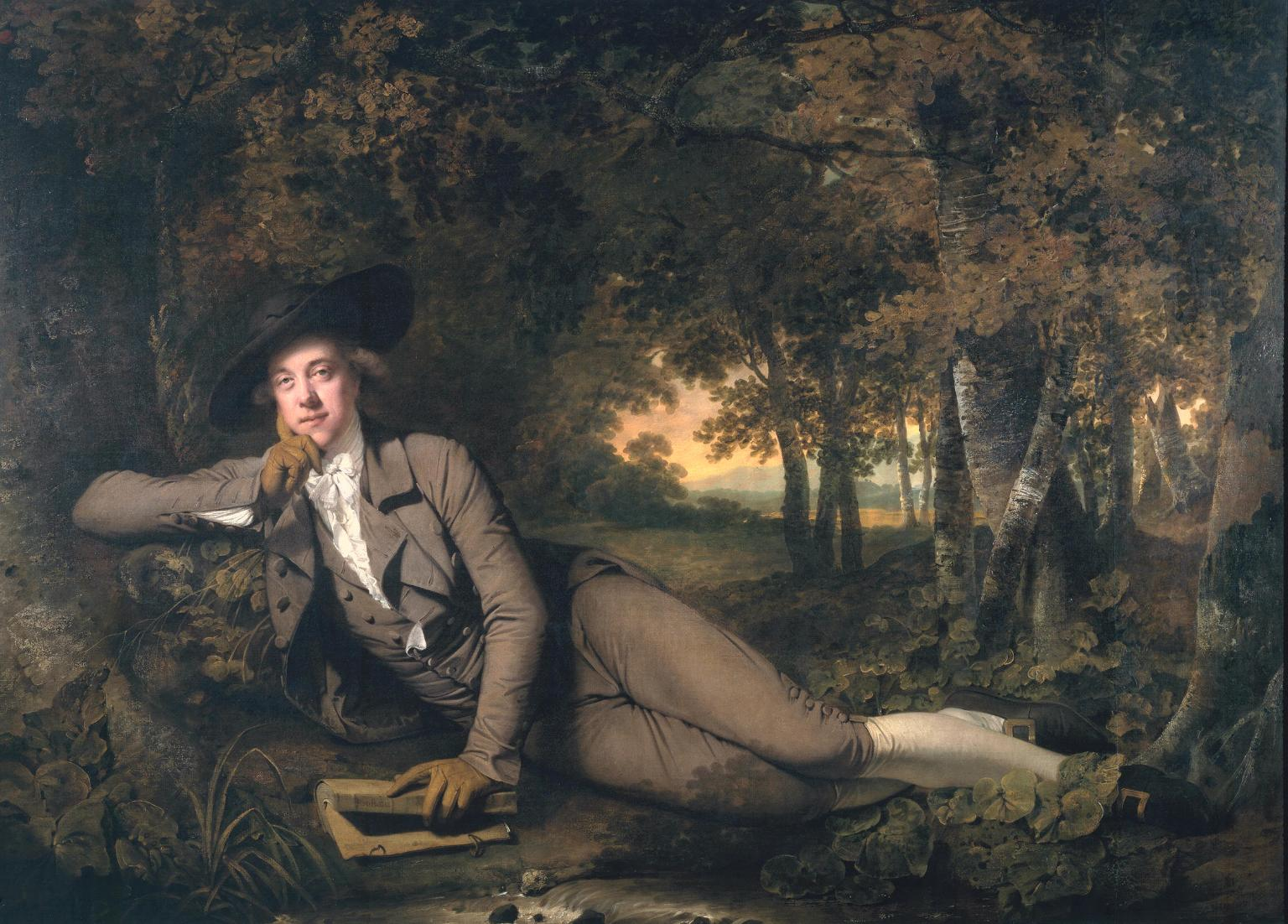
Sir Brooke Boothby, 6th Baronet, by Joseph Wright, 1781

The Boothby baronetcy, of Broadlow Ash in the County of Derby, was created in the Baronetage of England on 13 July 1660 for William Boothby, subsequently High Sheriff of Derbyshire from 1661 to 1662. During the Stuart Restoration of 1660, Boothby successfully petitioned for the creation, on the grounds of a failed creation in 1644, for his father (see below).

The 1st Baronet married, as his second wife, Hill, daughter of Sir William Brooke, hence the common family name Brooke. Sir William Brooke was heir to the barony of Cobham through his mother, but did not succeed to the peerage because the peerages were under attainder. On his death, the peerage fell into abeyance among his four daughters. Boothby was succeeded by his grandson Henry (son of his deceased son Francis from his first marriage to Frances Milward of Snitterton Hall).

The Boothbys left Broadlow Ash when the 1st Baronet purchased Ashbourne Hall from Sir Aston Cockayne, in about 1671.

== Boothby baronets, of Broadlow Ash (1660) ==
- Sir William Boothby, 1st Baronet (c. 1638–1707)
- Sir Henry Boothby, 2nd Baronet (1682–1710). He died unmarried at age 18.
- Sir William Boothby, 3rd Baronet (1664–1731). Son of the 2nd Baronet by his second marriage to Mary Hill.
- Sir William Boothby, 4th Baronet (1721–1787). Grandson. He was a general in the British Army. He would have succeeded to the barony of Cobham but for the Brooke attainders.
- Sir Brooke Boothby, 5th Baronet (1710–1789). First cousin once removed. He was the eldest son of Brooke Boothby, third son of the second marriage of the 1st Baronet.
- Sir Brooke Boothby, 6th (or 7th) Baronet (1744–1824). He was a poet and friend of Jean-Jacques Rousseau. He was famously painted in a Romantic pose by Joseph Wright in 1781 (see external links below).
- Sir William Boothby, 7th Baronet (1746–1824). Brother.
- Sir William Boothby, 8th Baronet (1782–1846). He was Receiver General of Customs at the Port of London.
- Sir Brooke William Robert Boothby, 9th Baronet (1809–1865). He was Rector of Elmley, Worcestershire, and of Welwyn, Hertfordshire. Ashbourne Hall, Derbyshire, the family seat for 200 years, was sold in accordance with his will.
- Sir Brooke Boothby, 10th Baronet (1856–1913). He was a diplomat who was appointed envoy to Chile in 1907, but was unable to take up the post because of ill health.
- Sir Charles Francis Boothby, 11th Baronet (1858–1926). Brother.
- Sir Herbert Cecil Boothby, 12th Baronet (1863–1935). Brother.
- Sir Seymour William Brooke Boothby, 13th Baronet (1866–1951). Brother.
- Sir Hugo Robert Brooke Boothby, 14th Baronet (1907–1986). He served as Lord-Lieutenant of South Glamorgan from 1974 to 1986.
- Sir Brooke Charles Boothby, 15th Baronet (born 1949).

The heir presumptive is the present holder's relation George William Boothby (born 1948). He is descended from Reverend Brooke Boothby, second son of the 7th Baronet.

== Boothby baronets, of Clater Cote (1644) ==
- Sir Henry Boothby, 1st Baronet (1594–1648). Charles I had intended to create a baronetcy for Henry Boothby (1594–1648), a Royalist, in 1644 (with the territorial designation "of Clate Clote in the County of Oxford"). The letters patent received the sign-manual of the King, but in the confusion of the Civil War, it did not pass the Great Seal.

== Extended family ==
Hill Boothby was born in 1708, a daughter of Brooke Boothby (died 1708) and Elizabeth Fitzherbert: she was a friend of Samuel Johnson. William Osbert Boothby (1866–1913), son of Reverend Evelyn Boothby, second son of Reverend Charles Boothby, third son of the seventh Baronet, was a captain in the Royal Navy. Basil Boothby, son of Basil Tanfield Beridge Boothby, youngest son of the aforementioned Reverend Evelyn Boothby, was a diplomat and served as Ambassador to Iceland from 1962 to 1965. Evelyn Leonard Beridge Boothby (1876–1937), son of Colonel Basil Charles Boothby (who was seriously wounded at the Battle of Alma during the Crimean War and had to have his leg amputated), fourth son of Reverend Charles Boothby (who at a young age fought in the Battle of Talavera where he lost a leg and was taken prisoner by the French), third son of the seventh Baronet, was also a captain in the Royal Navy. John George Boothby (1824–1876), third son of Reverend Brooke Boothby, second son of the seventh Baronet, was a major-general in the Royal Artillery.
