= Bully's Acre =

Bully's Acre may refer to:

- Bully's Acre, County Longford, near Ballinalee
- Bully's Acre, Dublin, near the Royal Hospital Kilmainham
