= Boothby =

Boothby may refer to:

== People ==
- Boothby (surname)
- Boothby Graffoe (comedian) (born James Martyn Rogers in 1962), English comedian, singer, songwriter and playwright

== Places ==
- Division of Boothby, an Australian federal electoral district in Adelaide
- Cape Boothby, Antarctica

== Other uses ==
- Boothby baronets, two titles in the Baronetage of England, one extant
- Boothby monument in St Oswald's Church, Ashbourne, England
- Boothby (Star Trek), groundskeeper at Starfleet Academy

== See also ==
- Boothby Graffoe, Lincolnshire, England
- Boothby Pagnell, Lincolnshire, England
