= Michael O'Brien Dilkes =

General Michael O'Brien Dilkes (1698 – August 1775) was a soldier of the British Army.

== Biography ==
He was born in 1698, the son of Rear-Admiral Sir Thomas Dilkes and his wife Lady Mary, daughter of Murrough O'Brien, 1st Earl of Inchiquin and widow of Henry Boyle of Castlemartyr. After his father's death in 1707 his mother married a third time, to Colonel John Irwin of Sligo. Sir Thomas Dilkes was said to be related to the family of Dilke of Maxstoke Castle.

Dilkes joined the Army as a cornet on 12 August 1712, and, in 1723, he was made captain in the 14th Regiment of Dragoons.

On 18 April 1728, he was elected to the Irish House of Commons for Castlemartyr, in a by-election following the death of John Fitzgerald.

He got leave from his regiment to attend Parliament in 1735-36 and would represent the constituency until the demise of the Crown in 1760. As a military Member of Parliament, Dilkes was mentioned, with Henry Clements and William Harrison, in Jonathan Swift's 1736 satirical poem on the Irish House of Commons, The Legion Club (the title alluding to Luke 8:30, where a possessed man says his name is Legion "because many devils were entered in him"):

There sit Clements, Dilkes, and Harrison,
How they swagger from their Garrison.
Such a Triplet could you tell
Where to find on this Side Hell?
Harrison, and Dilkes, and Clements,
Souse them in their own Excrèments.
Every Mischief's in their Hearts,
If they fail 'tis Want of Parts.

He was promoted to major in the 14th Dragoons on 14 January 1738, but had left the regiment by 1742. On 14 November 1745 he was promoted colonel.

Dilkes held the posts of Quartermaster-General and Barrack-Master-General of the Forces in Ireland, but after voting alongside his half-brother Henry Boyle against the government in the Money Bill dispute in December 1753 he was deprived of his offices. However, the following year he was promoted to major-general, with seniority of 11 March 1755, and made Governor of the Royal Hospital Kilmainham. He was further promoted to lieutenant-general in 1759. In about 1760 he attempted to convert the cemetery at Bully's Acre into a botanic garden for the Hospital, but the project was abandoned after the men of the Liberties rioted in protest. Dilkes also served as Commander-in-Chief of the Forces in Ireland. He was promoted to full general in 1772 and in 1774 he was appointed colonel of the 50th Regiment of Foot, holding the post until his death in August 1775.

On 16 October 1734 Dilkes had married Anne, daughter of Duncan Cummin MD; he was survived by their children Thomas, Henry, John and Mary. The eldest son, Thomas, was serving in America as major of the 49th Regiment of Foot, but the "considerable pecuniary disappointments" he experienced on his father's death obliged him to sell out. Thomas Dilkes was the father of William Thomas Dilkes, who also became a general.

Parliament of Ireland
Preceded by Bartholomew Purdon; John Fitzgerald	Member of Parliament for Castlemartyr; 1728–1760; With: Bartholomew Purdon 1728–1737; Thomas Evans 1737–1753; John Lysaght 1753–1760	Succeeded by Anthony Malone; John Magill
Military offices
Preceded by Sir William Boothby	Colonel of the 50th Regiment of Foot; 1774–1775	Succeeded by George Monson
