= John Boothby =

English cricketer and British Army officer

Major-General John Boothby
- Born: John George Boothby; 22 June 1824; Southwell, Nottinghamshire, England
- Died: 27 April 1876 (aged 51); Charlton, England
- Military career
- Allegiance: United Kingdom
- Branch: British Army
- Service years: 1844–1875
- Rank: Major-General
- Conflicts: Crimean War
- Awards: Legion of Honour; Order of the Medjidie
- Cricket career

Cricket information

Domestic team information
- Years: Team
- 1858–1859: Marylebone Cricket Club

Career statistics
Competition	First-class
Matches	2
Runs scored	10
Batting average	3.33
100s/50s	0/0
Top score	5
Catches/stumpings	0/–
- Source: CricInfo, 4 August 2025

Major-General John George Boothby (22 June 1824 – 27 April 1876) was a British Army officer and an English first-class cricketer.

The son of The Reverend Brooke Boothby, he was born in June 1824 at Southwell, Nottinghamshire. He was educated at Charterhouse School, after which he attended the Royal Military Academy, Woolwich. He graduated from there as a second lieutenant into the Royal Artillery in June 1844, with promotion to first lieutenant following in April 1846. Shortly before the commencement of the Crimean War, he was promoted to second captain in August 1852. Boothby served in the conflict and saw action at the battles of Alma and Balaclava, and the Siege of Sevastopol. He was twice promoted during the war, being made a brevet major in December 1854, and promoted to captain in September 1855. For his contribution to the war, Boothby was made a Knight of the Legion of Honour by France and was decorated with the Order of the Medjidie, 5th Class by the Ottoman Empire.

Boothby played first-class cricket in England for the Marylebone Cricket Club in 1858 and 1859, making two appearances against Cambridge University at Cambridge and Kent at Maidstone. scoring 10 runs with a highest score of 5. As his military career progressed, Boothby became a brevet lieutenant colonel in March 1862, before gaining the full rank in August 1866. Having completed five years as a lieutenant colonel in September 1871, he was made a colonel in the Army under the provisions of the Royal Warrant. Boothby retired from active service on full pay in July 1875, at which point he was granted the honorary rank of major-general. He died in April 1876 at Charlton, Kent.
