= Boothby (surname) =

Boothby is a surname. Notable people with the surname include:

- Basil Boothby (1910–1990), British diplomat
- Benjamin Boothby (1803–1868), judge of the Supreme Court of South Australia
- Sir Brooke Boothby, 6th Baronet (1744–1824), British poet and friend of Jean-Jacques Rousseau
- Sir Brooke Boothby, 10th Baronet (1856–1913), British diplomat
- David Boothby (born 1944), Canadian Police Chief
- Dora Boothby (1881–1970), English tennis player
- Frances Boothby (fl. 1669–1670), English playwright
- Frederic E. Boothby (1845–1923), American railroad manager and politician
- Guy Boothby (1867–1905), Australian-born author of the Dr. Nikola novels
- Ian Boothby (born 1967), comic book writer, comedian
- Josiah Boothby (1837–1916), Australian public administrator
- Neil Boothby, child psychologist
- Robert Boothby, Baron Boothby (1900–1986), British politician
- Robert Tuite Boothby (1871–1941), British banker, father of Robert Boothby
- Scott Boothby (born 1973), American hammer thrower
- Thomas Boothby of Tooley, founder of the Quorn Hunt in Leicestershire, England
- Thomas Wilde Boothby (1839–1885), aka T. Wilde Boothby, a politician in South Australia
- Valerie Boothby (1906–1982), German actress
- William Boothby (1829–1903), the Returning Officer for the first Australian federal election, after whom the Division of Boothby was named
- William "Cocktail" Boothby (1862–1930), bartender, mixologist, author of The World's Drinks And How To Mix Them
- William M. Boothby (1918–2021), American mathematician
