= Manor of Kilmainham =

Ancient Manor County Dublin in Ireland

The Manor of Kilmainham was a manor encompassing the village of Kilmainham in County Dublin, Ireland, just outside the city of Dublin. It was one of several manors, or liberties, that existed in Dublin after the arrival of the Anglo-Normans in the 12th century. The manors were town lands united to the city, but still preserving their own jurisdiction.

== History ==
The boundaries of this liberty were first drawn up by John, when Lord of Ireland, in 1192, referring to a former charter of local franchises granted by King Henry II of England which are now lost.

The lands on the banks of the Liffey at Kilmainham, near Dublin, were granted to the Knights Hospitaller of St John of Jerusalem. It was incorrectly recorded by Walter Harris as originally belonging to the Knights Templar, an order founded in 1118 for the protection of pilgrims in the Holy Land. This incorrect claim was again repeated by Nathanial Burton's History of the Hospitals of Kilmainham.

Strongbow had a castle constructed close to what was to become the site of the Royal Hospital Kilmainham for the Knights Hospitaller. In 1307 King Edward II started to suppress the order of Templers in England, and ordered his deputy in Ireland, John Wogan, to do the same without delay. The knights were imprisoned and examined at Dublin Castle, but were not burned at the stake, as many of their order were in other countries. Their priory at Clontarf, lands and privileges were given to the priory of the Knights of St. John of Jerusalem, who remained in possession until the dissolution of the monasteries in the 16th century.

Until the time of Queen Elizabeth I, when Dublin Castle became the centre of English power, the Lord Lieutenants often held court at the manor of Kilmainham. In 1559, the earl of Sussex, on being again appointed lord lieutenant, found that the building at Kilmainham had been damaged by a storm, and had to hold court at the Palace of St. Sepulchre. The following year Elizabeth ordered that Dublin Castle be upgraded to enable the lord lieutenant to reside there.

The last Lord Deputy recorded as a resident of Kilmainham Castle was William Russell between 1594 and 1596.

James Ware recorded that the priory/castle was demolished in 1612 (MS. B. Rawl. 479, F115).

In 1813 the population of this manor was 2,149 males and 2,569 females.

== Privileges ==
In return for the support of the Lord of the Manor, or to alleviate certain hardships suffered by Englishmen, privileges were granted to the manor at various times and by various kings of England. These allowed the manor to have its own courts of justice (Court leet, where it was allowed to try all crimes except "forestalling, rape, treasure-trove and arson"), free customs, freedom from certain taxes and services, impose its own fines, have its own coroners, rights of salvage, maintain its own fairs and markets, regulate weights and measures, etc.

These rights and privileges ended in 1840.

== Administration ==
After the Reformation, former lords (or chairmen, as they were later called) of this manor included Lord Cloncurry and Sir Edward Newenham. John "Bully" Egan, from Charleville, County Cork, was chairman from 1790 to 1800. In the final debate in the Irish Parliament on the Act of Union, Egan delivered a strong speech against the motion and exclaimed, after sitting down upon finishing his speech: "Ireland – Ireland for ever! and damn Kilmainham!" With the Act passing, his vote against the Union saw him deprived of his chairmanship.
