= 50th (Queen's Own) Regiment of Foot =

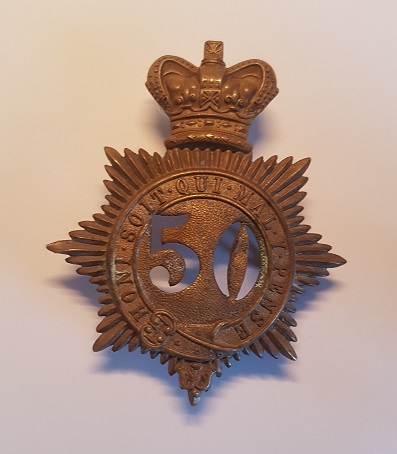
- Cap Badge of the 50th Regiment of Foot
- Active: 1755 to 1881
- Country: Kingdom of Great Britain (1755–1800); United Kingdom (1801–1881)
- Branch: British Army
- Type: Line Infantry
- Size: One battalion (two battalions 1804–1814)
- Garrison/HQ: Maidstone Barracks, Kent
- Nicknames: "The Dirty Half-Hundred" "The Blind Half-Hundred"
- Engagements: Seven Years' War; Napoleonic Wars; Gwalior campaign First Anglo-Sikh War; Crimean War; New Zealand Wars

The 50th (Queen's Own) Regiment of Foot was an infantry regiment of the British Army, raised in 1755. Under the Childers Reforms it amalgamated with the 97th (The Earl of Ulster's) Regiment of Foot to form the Queen's Own Royal West Kent Regiment in 1881.

== History ==
=== Early history ===
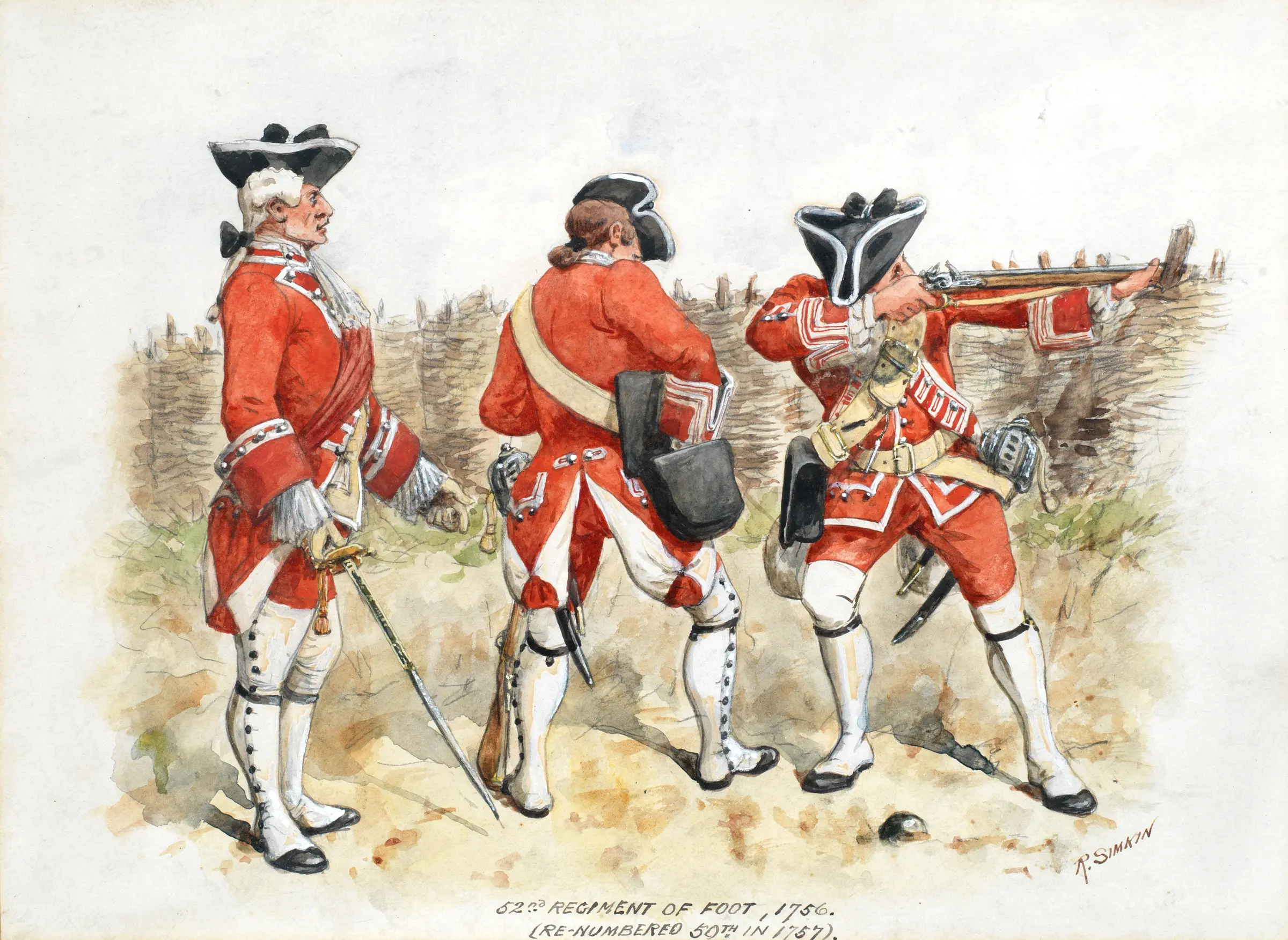
An officer and two privates of the regiment in 1756

The regiment was originally raised by Colonel James Abercrombie as the 52nd Regiment of Foot in 1755 for service in the Seven Years' War. It was re-numbered as the 50th Regiment of Foot, following the disbandment of the existing 50th and 51st regiments, in 1756. The regiment's first action was when it embarked on ships and took part in the Raid on Rochefort in September 1757 during the Seven Years' War. In its early years the regiment wore a uniform of black facings and white lace; when they wiped sweat away with their cuffs the dye stained their faces, giving rise to the nickname the "Dirty Half-Hundred" ("half-hundred" equals fifty)."

The regiment embarked for Germany in June 1760 and saw action at the Battle of Corbach in July 1760, the Battle of Warburg later that month and the Battle of Villinghausen in July 1761 as well as the Battle of Wilhelmsthal in June 1762. It returned home in March 1763.

The regiment was posted to Jamaica in 1772, and then to New York in 1776. At this point, troops were transferred to other regiments and the officers returned to England to raise a new force; as such, the regiment did not see action in the American Revolutionary War. The men of the regiment served on various ships of the Royal Navy as marines and saw action at the First Battle of Ushant in July 1778. The regiment adopted a county designation and became the 50th (West Kent) Regiment of Foot in 1782.

The regiment embarked for Gibraltar in August 1784 and then moved to Corsica in January 1793 for service in the French Revolutionary Wars and took part in the Siege of Calvi in July 1794. It returned to Gibraltar in 1797 and moved to Menorca in 1799 before embarking for Egypt in 1800. The regiment fought at the Battle of Mandora in March 1801, the Battle of Alexandria later that month and the Siege of Cairo in May 1801. The regiment then proceeded to Malta in October 1801 and to Ireland in May 1802.

=== Napoleonic Wars ===
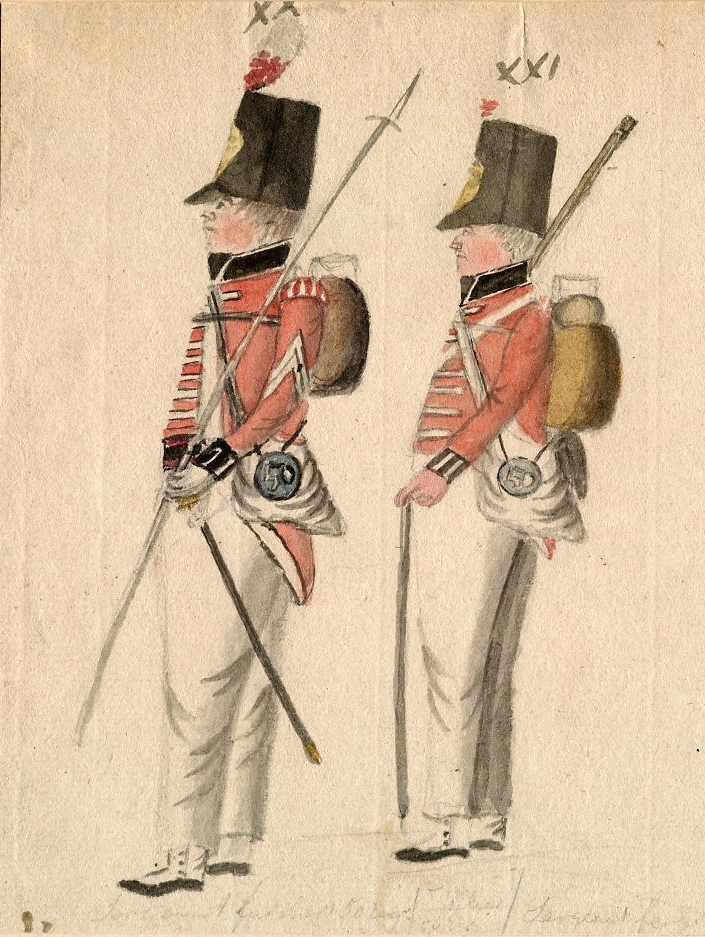
1809 illustration of a regimental sergeant and private

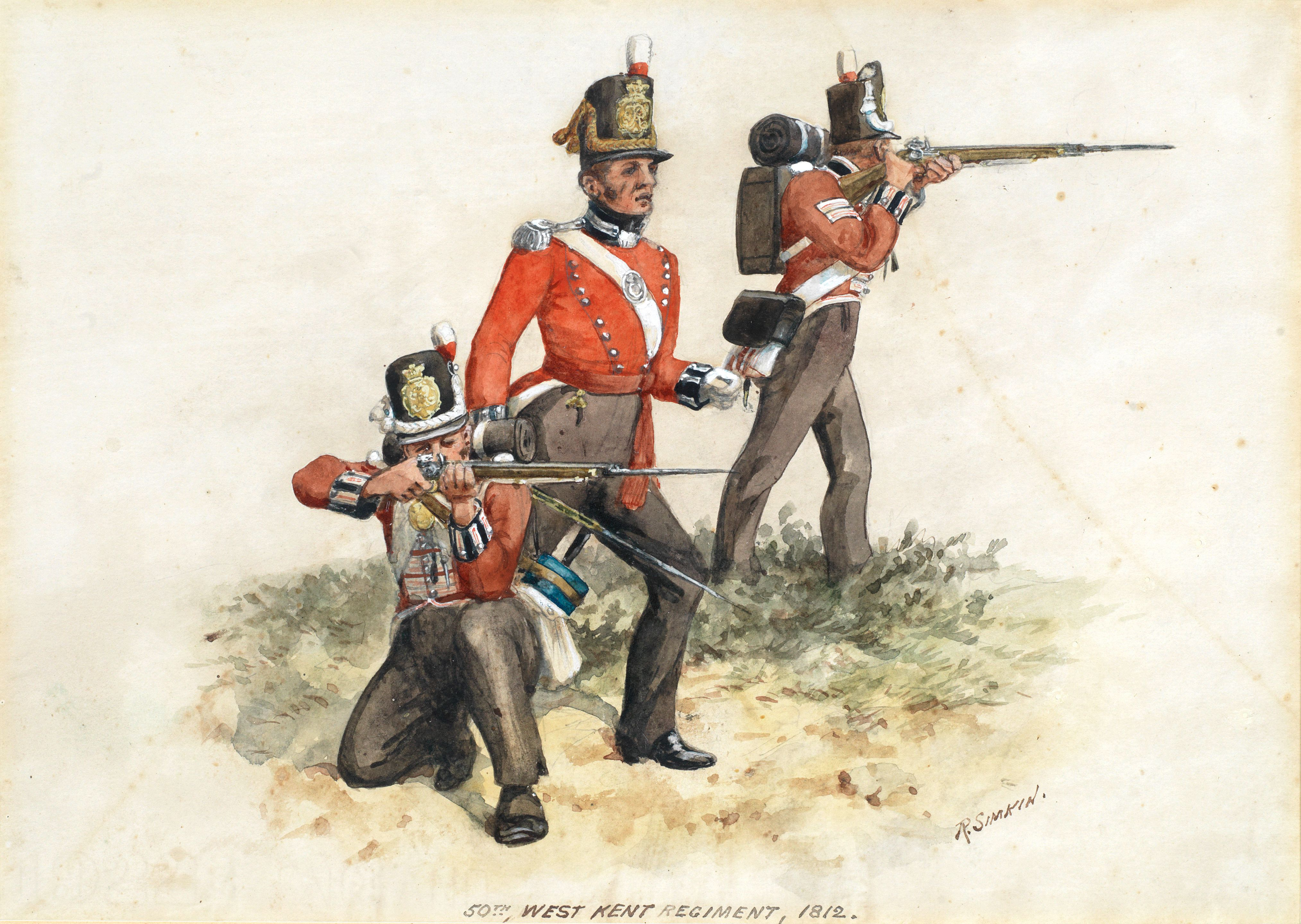
A private, lieutenant and corporal of the regiment in 1812

A second battalion was raised in 1804 to increase the strength of the regiment. The 1st battalion embarked for Copenhagen in July 1807 and saw action at the Battle of Copenhagen in August 1807 during the Gunboat War before returning home in November 1807. It then embarked for Portugal in May 1808 for service under General Sir Arthur Wellesley in the Peninsular War and saw action at the Battle of Roliça in August 1808 and the Battle of Vimeiro later that month. In January 1809 the battalion took part in the Battle of Corunna, commanded by Charles James Napier, carrying out successive bayonet charges to keep the French at bay, at which General Sir John Moore shouted "Well done, 50th! Well done, my Majors!". The battalion was subsequently evacuated from the Peninsula. Both battalions then embarked from the Downs in July 1809 and saw action in the disastrous Walcheren Campaign. It was the last regiment to leave Holland in December 1809.

The 1st battalion returned to Portugal in September 1810 and took part in the Battle of Fuentes de Oñoro in May 1811, the Battle of Arroyo dos Molinos in October 1811 and the Battle of Almaraz in May 1812 as well as the Battle of Vitoria in June 1813. It then pursued the French Army into France and fought at the Battle of the Pyrenees in July 1813, the Battle of Nivelle in November 1813 and the Battle of the Nive in December 1813 as well as the Battle of Orthez in February 1814 and the Battle of Toulouse in April 1814. The regiment returned to Ireland in July 1814.

=== The Victorian era ===
The regiment was deployed to the West Indies in January 1819 and landed in Jamaica in March 1819. It was renamed the 50th (or Duke of Clarence's) Regiment of Foot, in honour of the future King William IV in 1827. It then became the 50th (the Queen's Own) Regiment of Foot in honour of the King's wife, Queen Adelaide in 1831. The regiment travelled to Australia in detachments as escorts to prisoners in 1834, with detachments then stationed at Sydney, Norfolk Island, and Tasmania, before being relieved and transported to India in 1841. It fought in the Gwalior campaign in December 1843 and were prominent at the Battle of Mudki in December 1845, the Battle of Ferozeshah later that month and the Battle of Aliwal in January 1846 as well as the Battle of Sobraon in February 1846 during the First Anglo-Sikh War. Lieutenant Colonel Thomas Ryan, who had commanded the regiment in the early battles of the campaign and then commanded the 2nd Brigade at Sobraon, died two months later from the wounds he had received in that battle. The regiment arrived back in England in July 1848.

The regiment embarked for Malta in February 1854 from where it sailed to Varna in June 1854 for service in the Crimean War. The regiment fought at the Battle of Alma in September 1854, the Battle of Inkerman in November 1854 and in the Siege of Sevastopol in winter 1854. The regiment left the Crimean Peninsula in May 1856.

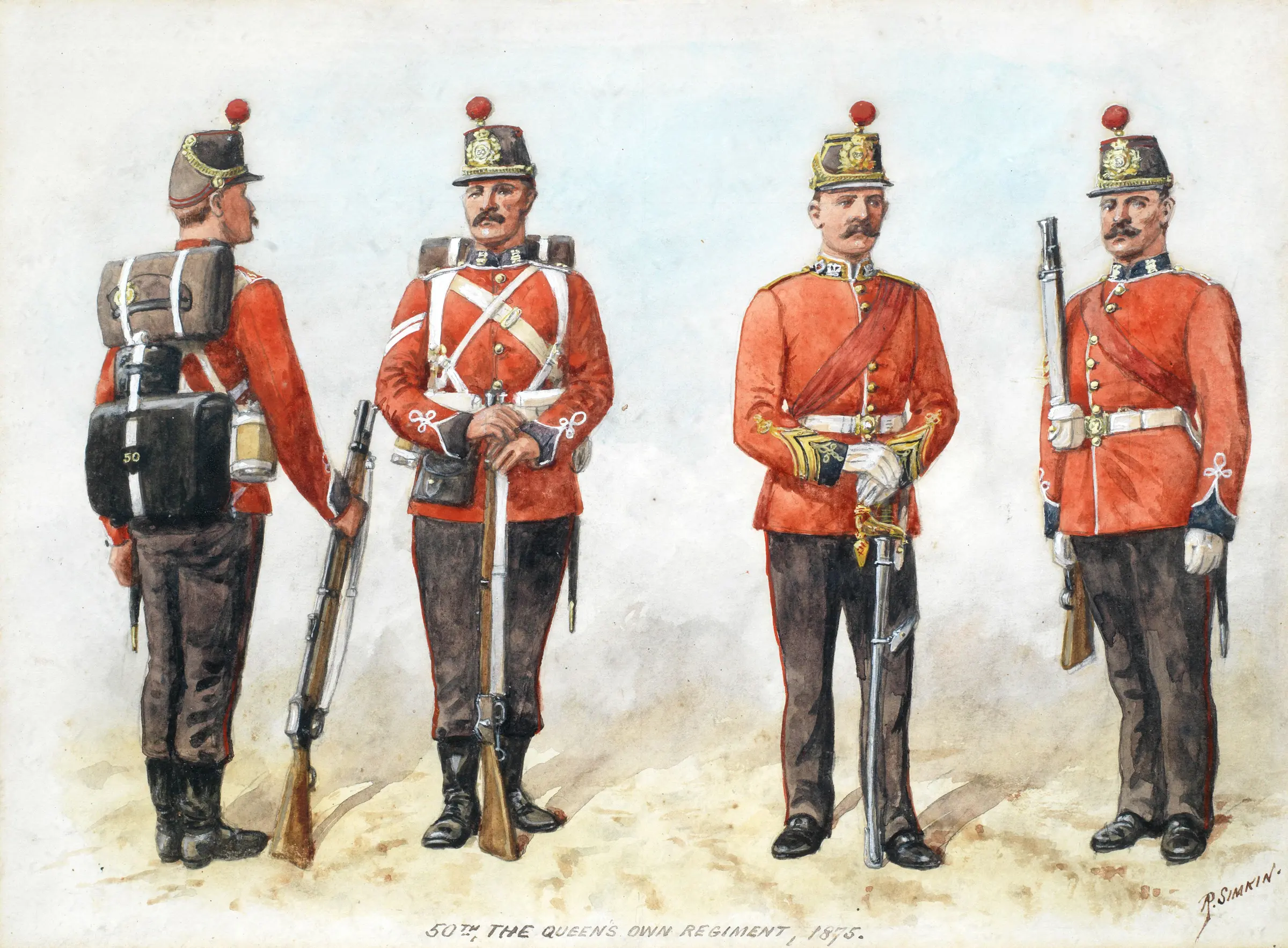
A private, corporal, captain and private of the regiment in 1875

The regiment landed in Auckland in November 1863 for service in the New Zealand Wars. It joined a field force which marched into the interior of the country as part of Lieutenant General Duncan Cameron's West Coast campaign and while encamped at Nukumaru near Whanganui came under sustained attack from Māori in January 1865 during the Second Taranaki War: a total of 11 private soldiers from the regiment and 23 Māori died in the engagement. The regiment moved to Sydney in June 1867 and then left for England in March 1869.

As part of the Cardwell Reforms of the 1870s, where single-battalion regiments were linked together to share a single depot and recruiting district in the United Kingdom, the 50th was linked with the 97th (The Earl of Ulster's) Regiment of Foot, and assigned to district no. 46 at Maidstone Barracks in Kent. On 1 July 1881 the Childers Reforms came into effect and the regiment amalgamated with the 97th (The Earl of Ulster's) Regiment of Foot to form the Queen's Own Royal West Kent Regiment.

== Battle Honours ==
The regiment's battle honours were as follows:

- French Revolutionary Wars 1793-1802: Egypt (With the Sphinx)
- Peninsular War 1808-14: Vimiero, Corunna, Almaraz, Vitoria, Pyrenees, Nive, Orthes, Peninsula
- Gwalior Campaign 1843: Punniar
- First Sikh War 1845-46: Moodkee, Ferozeshah, Aliwal, Sobraon
- Crimean War 1854-55: Alma, Inkerman, Sevastapol
- Third Maori War 1863-66: New Zealand

== Colonels ==
The regiment's colonels were as follows:

=== 50th Regiment of Foot ===
- 1755–1756: Gen James Abercromby
- 1756–1759: F.M. Studholme Hodgson
- 1759–1760: F.M. John Griffin Whitwell, 4th Baron Howard de Walden KB
- 1760–1764: Lt-Gen Edward Carr
- 1764–1774: Gen Sir William Boothby Bt
- 1774–1775: Gen Michael O'Brien Dilkes
- 1775–1776: Col Hon George Monson (died in office in 1776)
- 1777–1798: Gen Sir Thomas Spencer Wilson Bt
- 1798–1839: Gen Sir James Duff

=== 50th (Queen's Own) Regiment of Foot ===
- 1839–1842: Gen Sir George Townshend Walker Bt GCB
- 1842–1844: Lt-Gen Sir Hudson Lowe KCB GCMG
- 1844–1849: Lt-Gen Sir John Gardiner KCB
- 1849–1851: Major-Gen Sir Dudley St Leger Hill KCB
- 1851–1852: Lt-Gen William Francis Bentinck Loftus
- 1852–1853: Major-Gen James Allan CB
- 1853–1854: Lt-Gen Sir George Arthur Bt KCH
- 1854–1861: Gen Sir Richard England GCB KH
- 1861–1862: Lt-Gen George Morton Eden
- 1862–1872: Lt-Gen Marcus John Slade
- 1872–1881: Gen Sir Edward Walter Forestier-Walker KCB

== Sources ==
- Fyler, Colonel Arthur Evelyn (1895). The History of the 50th Or (the Queen's Own) Regiment from the Earliest Date to the Year 1881. London: Chapman and Hall.
