= Bully's Acre, Dublin =

Cemetery in Dublin, Ireland

Bully's Acre
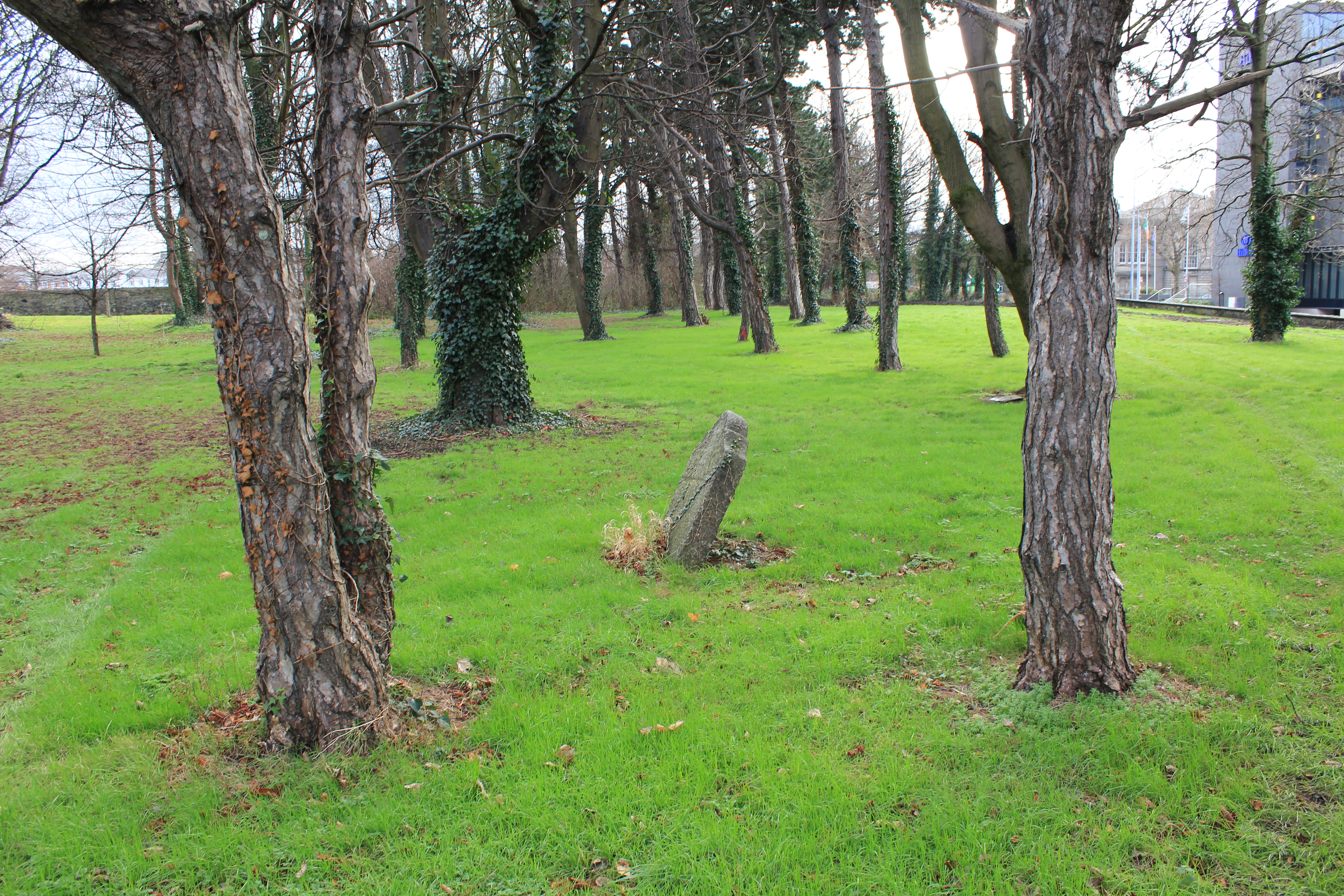
- Gravestone in Bully's Acre
- Interactive map of Bully's Acre

Details
- Established: c. AD 900
- Location: Kilmainham, Dublin
- Coordinates: 53°20′34″N 6°18′24″W
- Type: Former cemetery, closed 1832; last burial in 1928
- Owned by: Public
- Size: 3.7 acres (1.5 ha)
- No. of graves: Over 200,000

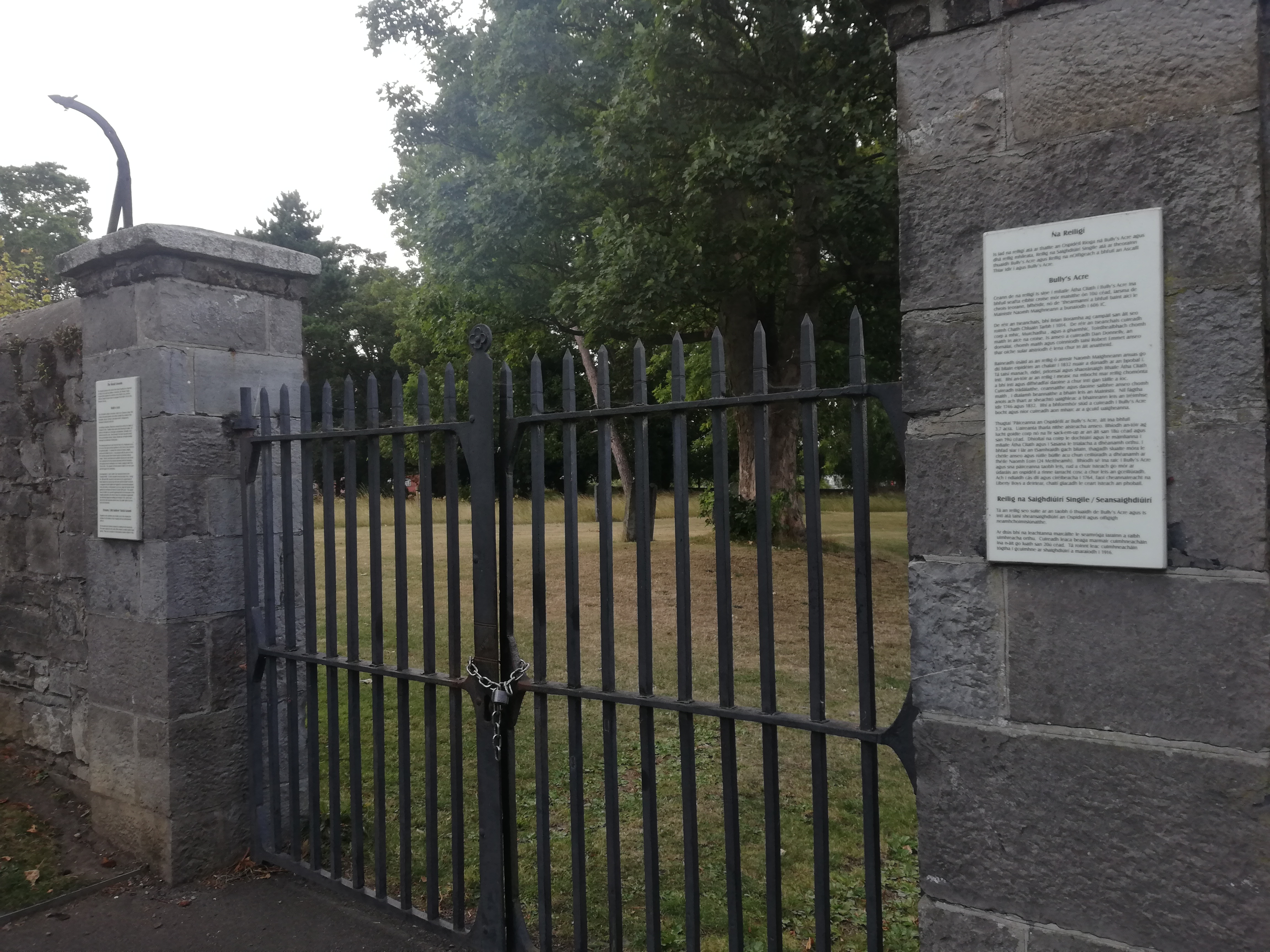
Entrance to Bully's Acre

Bully's Acre (officially, the Hospital Fields; Irish: Acra an Bhulaí) is a former public cemetery located near the Royal Hospital Kilmainham in Dublin, Ireland. It is 3.7 acres (1.5 ha) in extent.

== Etymology ==
The name is believed to derive from the graveyard's being a site for boxing matches, or perhaps from "baily" (bailiff), a nickname for the officials of the priory at Kilmainham.

== History ==
There was a graveyard on this spot for over a thousand years. The graveyard is believed to hold the graves of some of those killed at the Battle of Clontarf, including a son and grandson of Brian Boru. Over time it became more famous as a pauper’s cemetery, as the land was believed to be common ground, and no charges were required for burials. But not only paupers were buried here, as many respectable Catholic citizens made use of the land, as after the Reformation there was no official Catholic graveyard in the city until Goldenbridge in 1828.

On feast days the cemetery was used for socialising which sometimes got out of hand, resulting in rowdyism and fighting. The largest of these was the "pattern" on the feast of St. John (24 June), when thousands trooped through the cemetery to St. John's Well, located across the road from the cemetery. Attempts were made by the Roman Catholic clergy on one hand, and the Government on the other, to have these gatherings suppressed, but without success until the 1830s, in the wake of a cholera epidemic.

About the year 1760 General Dilkes, Commander of the Forces, attempted to turn the cemetery into a botanic garden for the Royal Hospital and he caused the graves to be levelled, spread a thick covering of lime over the entire surface, and enclosed the place with a high wall. The local men of the Liberties, however, annoyed at the offence to their ancestors and relatives interred there, collected in a body one night, and fought a pitched battle against the soldiers of the Royal Hospital. Eventually, the wall was levelled and the place was restored to its original purpose.

The cemetery fell into decay towards the end of the 18th century. It was also a favourite target of body snatchers, as it was not surrounded by a particularly high wall or railings (though it did have watchmen). John Cheyne, an eminent surgeon working in Dublin, wrote to his colleague Edward Percival describing the body-snatching techniques in vogue about 1818: "The bodies used in most of the dissecting rooms are derived from the great cemetery for the poor called Hospital Fields – vulgo Bullys' Acre." Peter Harkan, a well-known Dublin surgeon from Sir Philip Crampton's school, and hitherto a very successful resurrectionist, fell victim in this cemetery while hunting for corpses. A party of watchmen spotted him and rushed towards him. He succeeded in getting his assistants over the cemetery wall, but when crossing himself, his legs were seized by the watchmen, while his pupils pulled against their opponents with such effect that he eventually died from the effects.

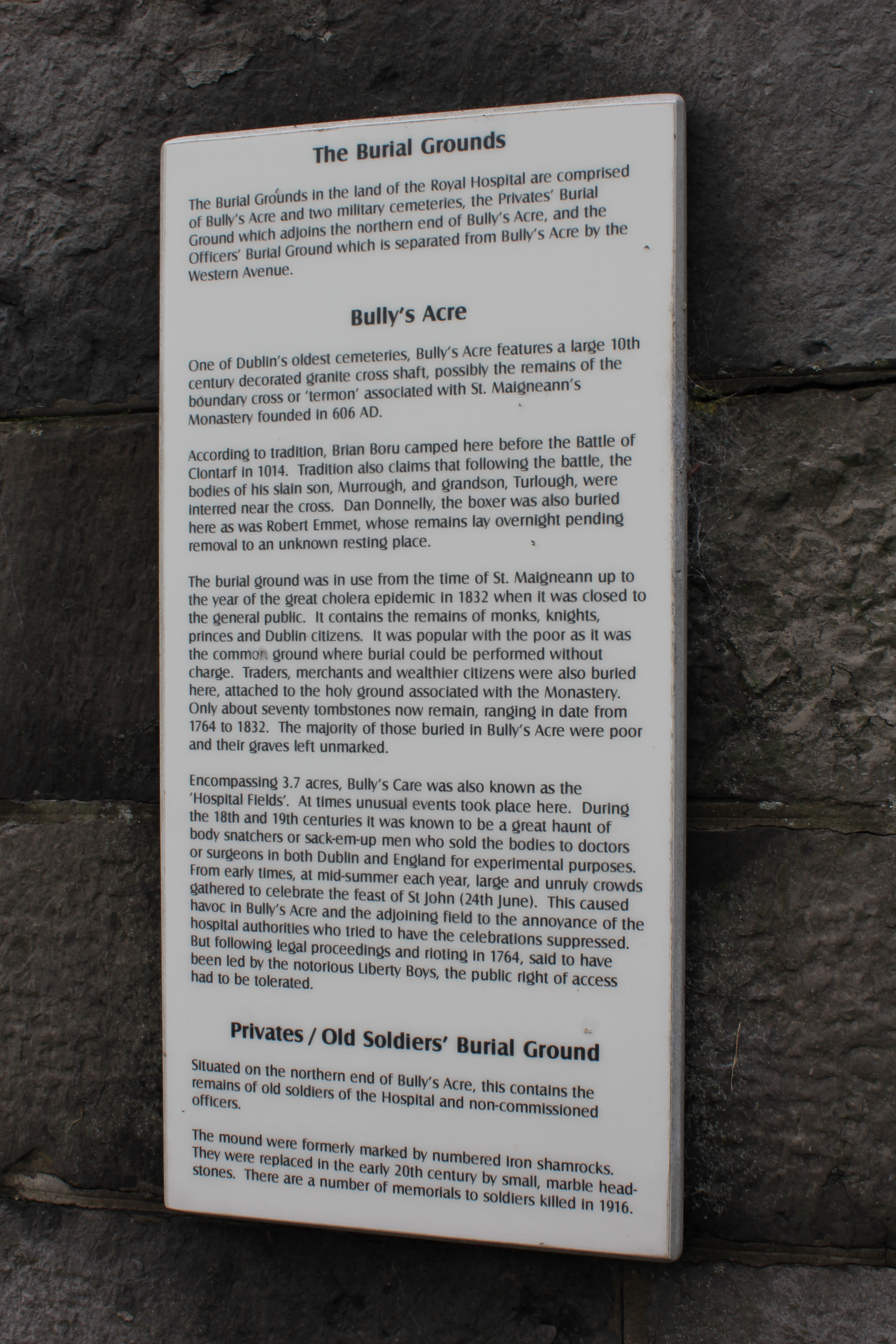
Information sign at the entrance to Bully's Acre

During the cholera epidemic of 1832 large numbers were buried here, which worsened the already congested state of things – the writer D'Alton stated that during the six months that the cholera raged in Dublin, 3,200 burials were made. Shortly afterwards the cemetery was closed by order of the government. By this time Goldenbridge and Glasnevin cemeteries were available for Catholics.

It is estimated that several hundred thousand persons were buried in the cemetery.

== Burials ==
Dan Donnelly (1788–1820), the famous Irish boxer, was buried here in an unmarked grave when he died in 1820. His body was taken by the body snatchers and sold to a Dublin surgeon, who demanded that it be returned, but he first removed the right arm. In 1953 the arm ended up on display in the Hideout, a public house in Kilcullen, County Kildare, for many years.
