= Richmond Tower (Kilmainham) =

Coordinates: 53.34211°N 6.306763°W

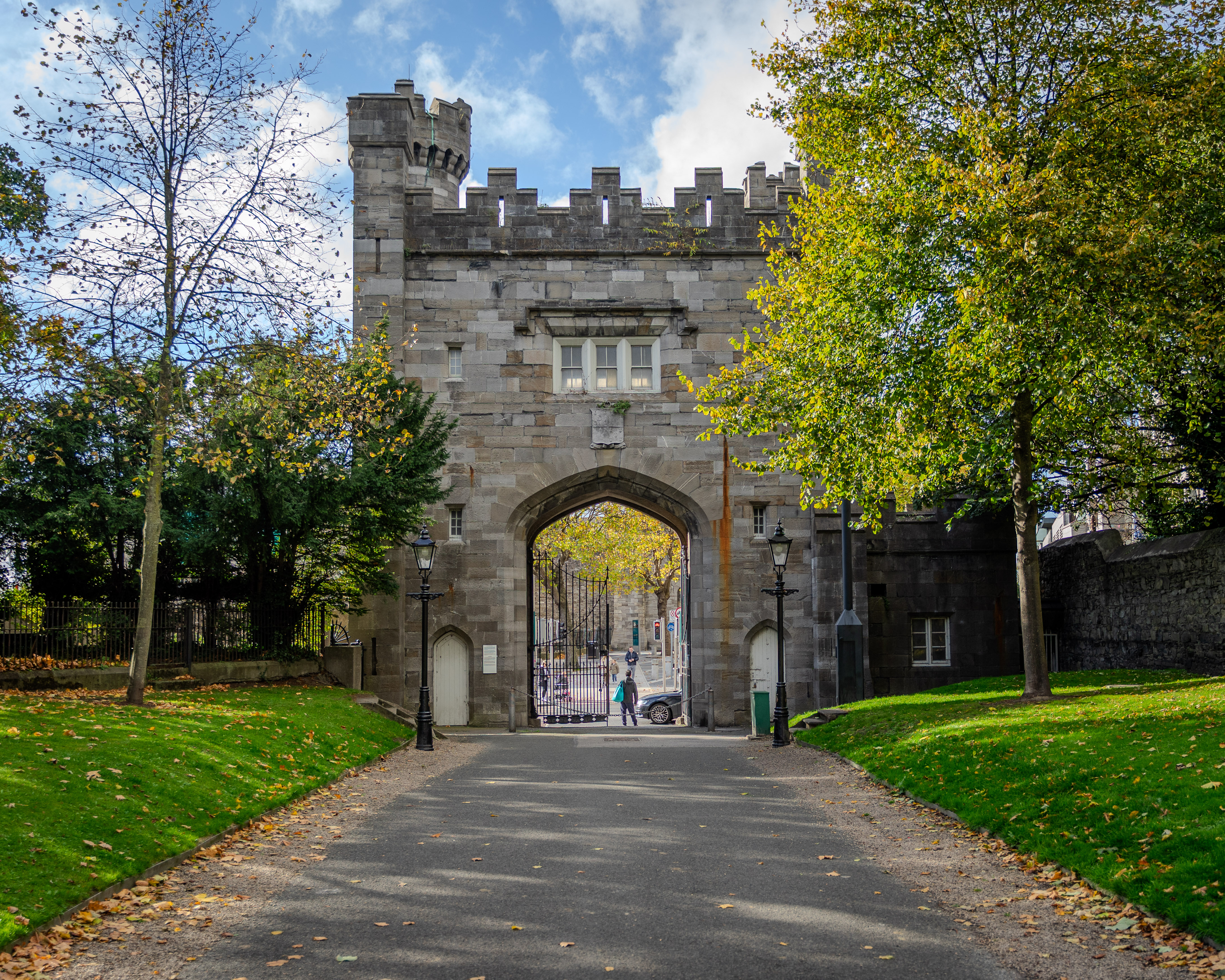
- Looking at the rear of the tower facing West.
- Interactive map of the Richmond Tower area
- Former names: Watling Street Gatehouse
- Alternative names: The West Gate

General information
- Architectural style: Tudor Gothic
- Location: Kilmainham, Dublin, Ireland
- Completed: 1812 (relocated in 1847)
- Client: Duke of Richmond (Lord Lieutenant)

Design and construction
- Architect: Francis Johnson

The Richmond Tower is an historical gateway to the Royal Hospital, Kilmainham, Dublin, designed by Francis Johnston and named after the Duke of Richmond, the Lord Lieutenant at the time. Built between 1810 and 1811, the gateway originally stood beside the River Liffey at Barrack Bridge at the junction of Watling Street and Victoria Quay, the tower had to be moved after the building of nearby Kingsbridge Station in 1846 caused traffic congestion at the site. The tower was dismantled and erected at its present location the following year at the expense of the railway company.

Following the move the structure was renamed from Watling Street Gatehouse to Richmond Tower, though it is sometimes referred to as the West Gate due to its location west of the main hospital building.

Johnston had placed his personal coat of arms above the arch, concealed by a piece of wood painted to match the stone, his idea being that his arms would be revealed to future generations after the wood became rotten. However, this was uncovered when the gateway was taken down for removal. The current coat of arms on the gateway is that of the Royal Hospital.

The tower is made from Dublin calp limestone.

== Gallery ==
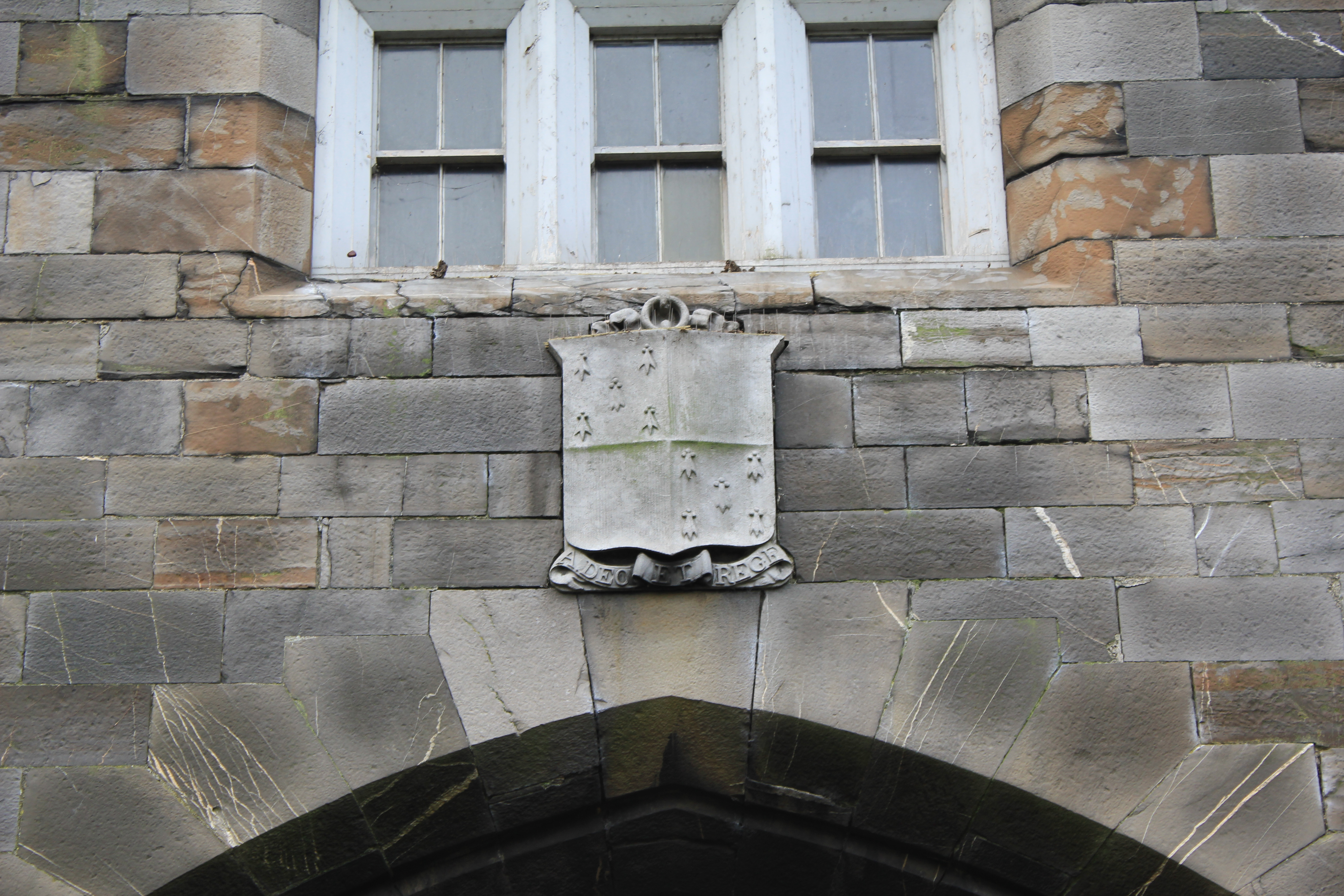
Coat of arms on the tower

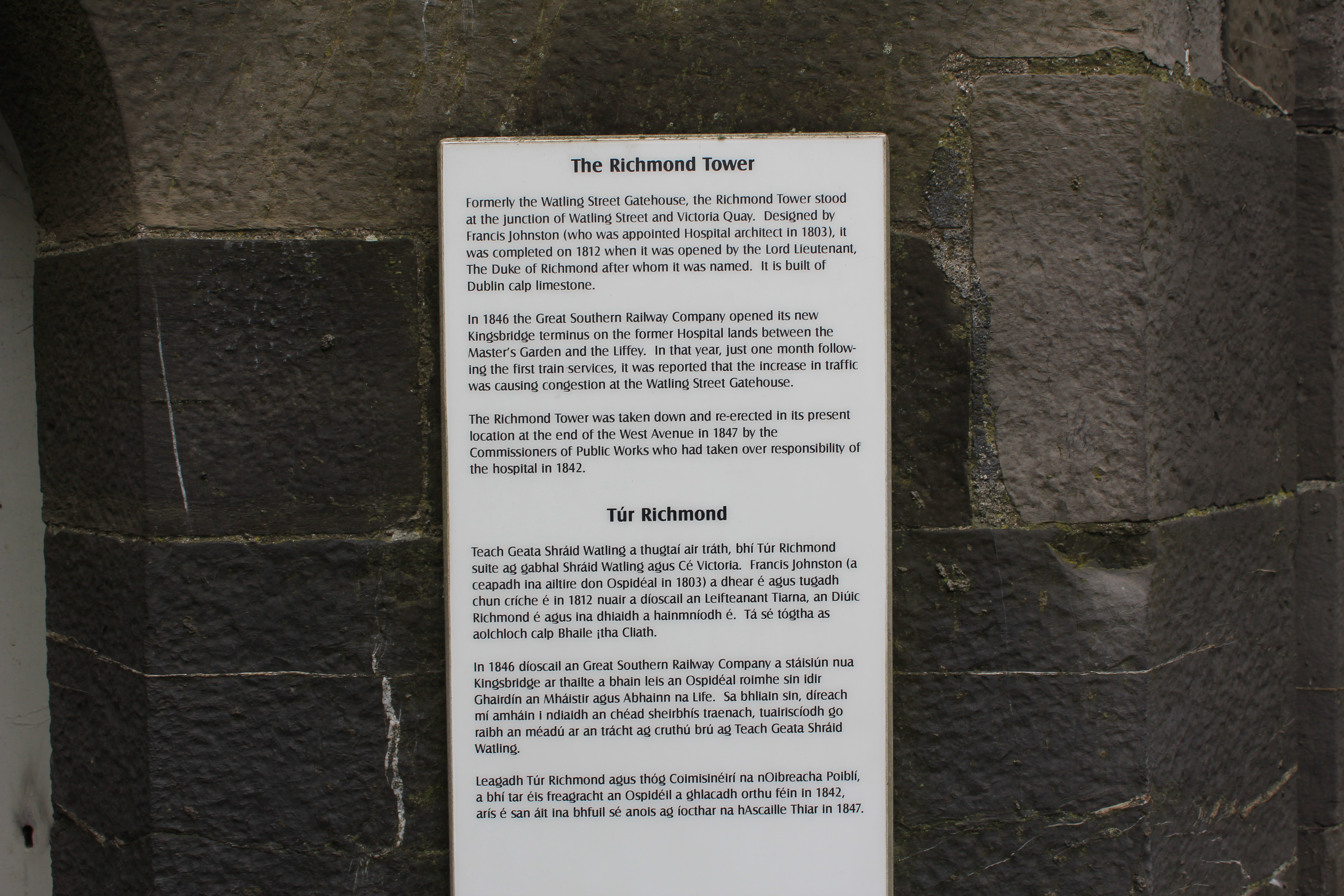
Information sign at tower

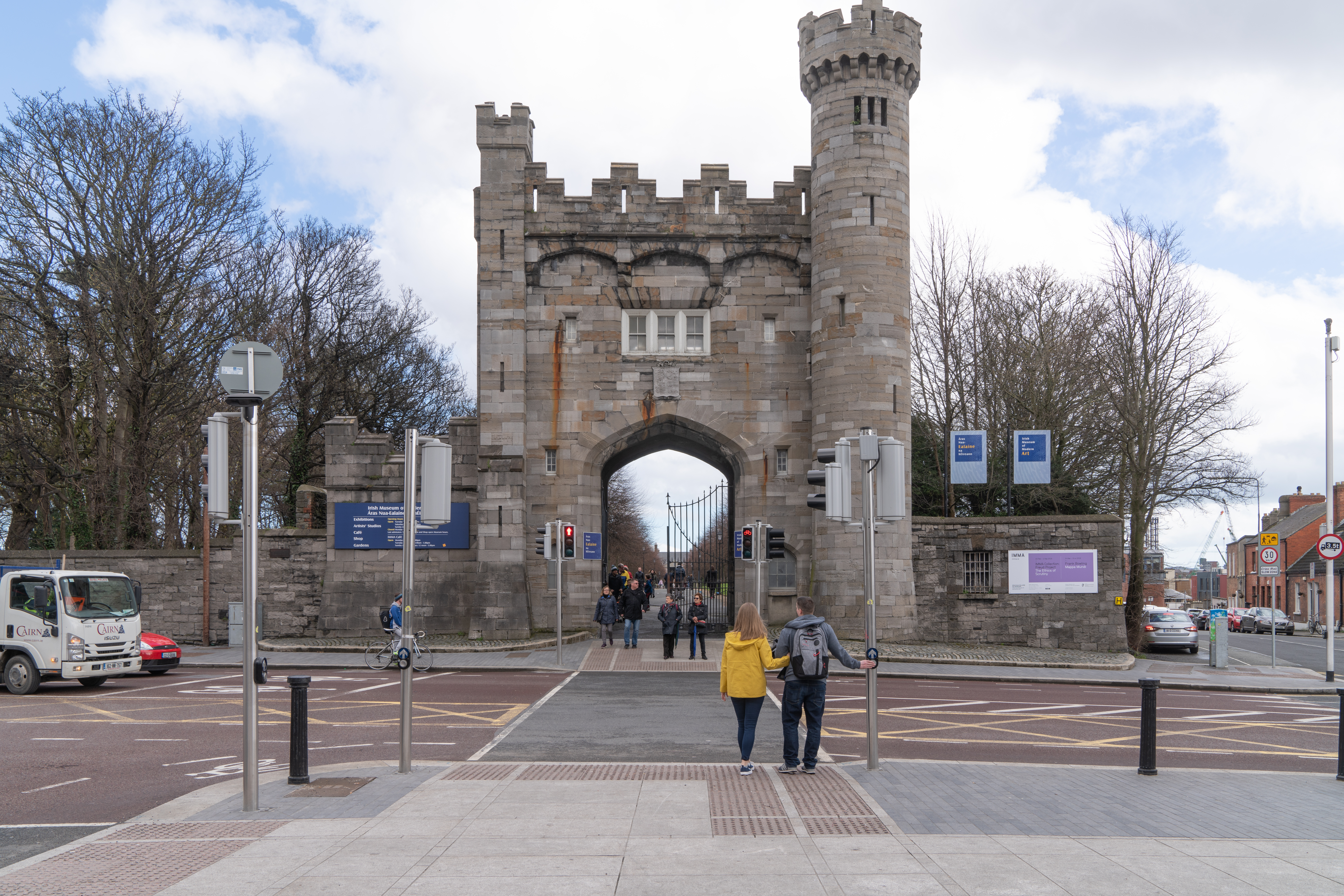
The tower as seen from outside the Kilmainham Courthouse.
