= Irish Museum of Modern Art =

- Músaem Nua-Ealaíne na hÉireann

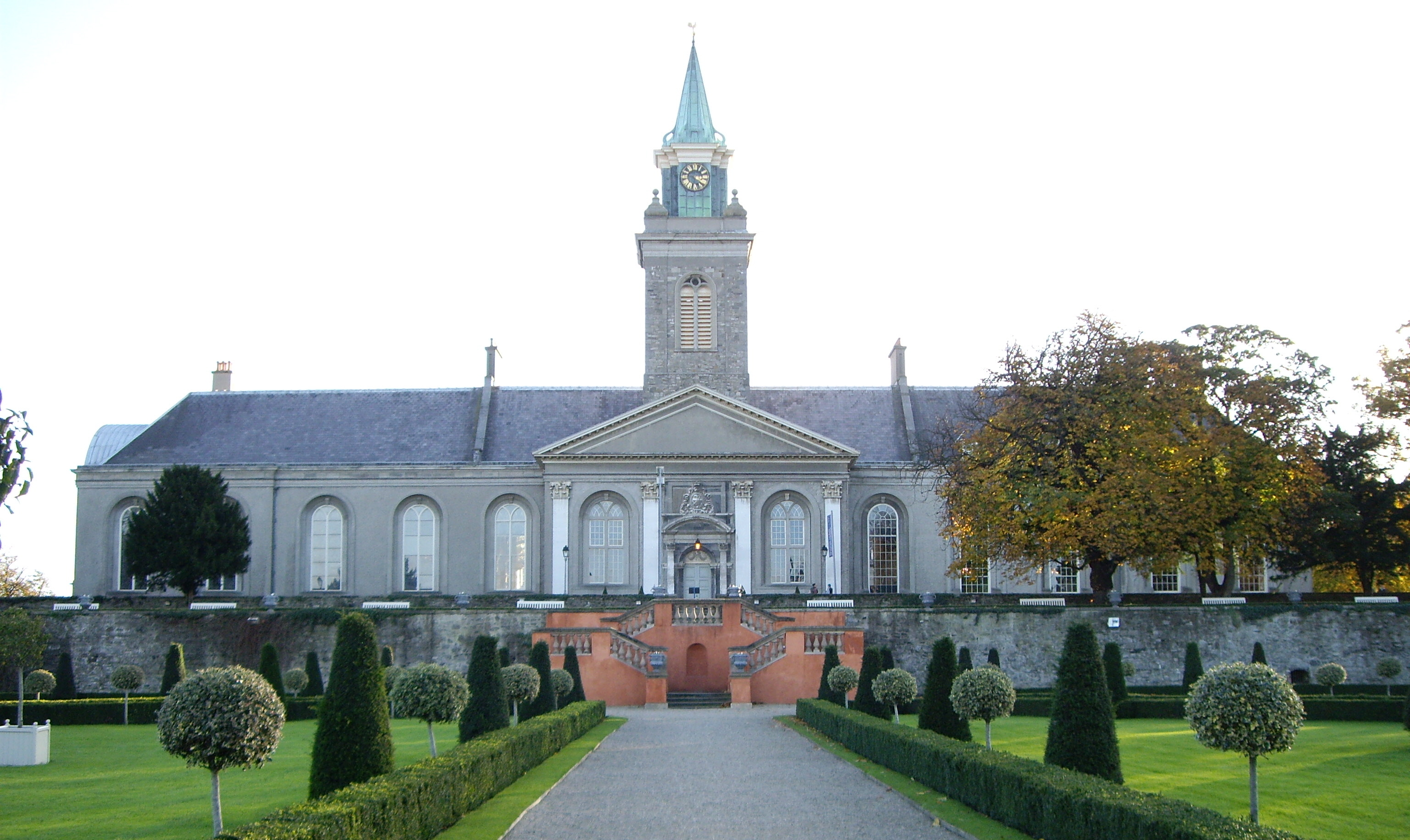
- North facade of the main building, viewed from the formal garden

- Location within Central Dublin
- Established: 25 May 1991
- Location: 8 Military Road, Kilmainham, Dublin, Ireland
- Coordinates: 53.343077°N 6.300037°W
- Type: Museum of modern art
- Chairperson: David Harvey
- Architect: William Robinson
- Public transit access: Heuston railway station James's Luas stop (Red Line)
- Website: imma.ie

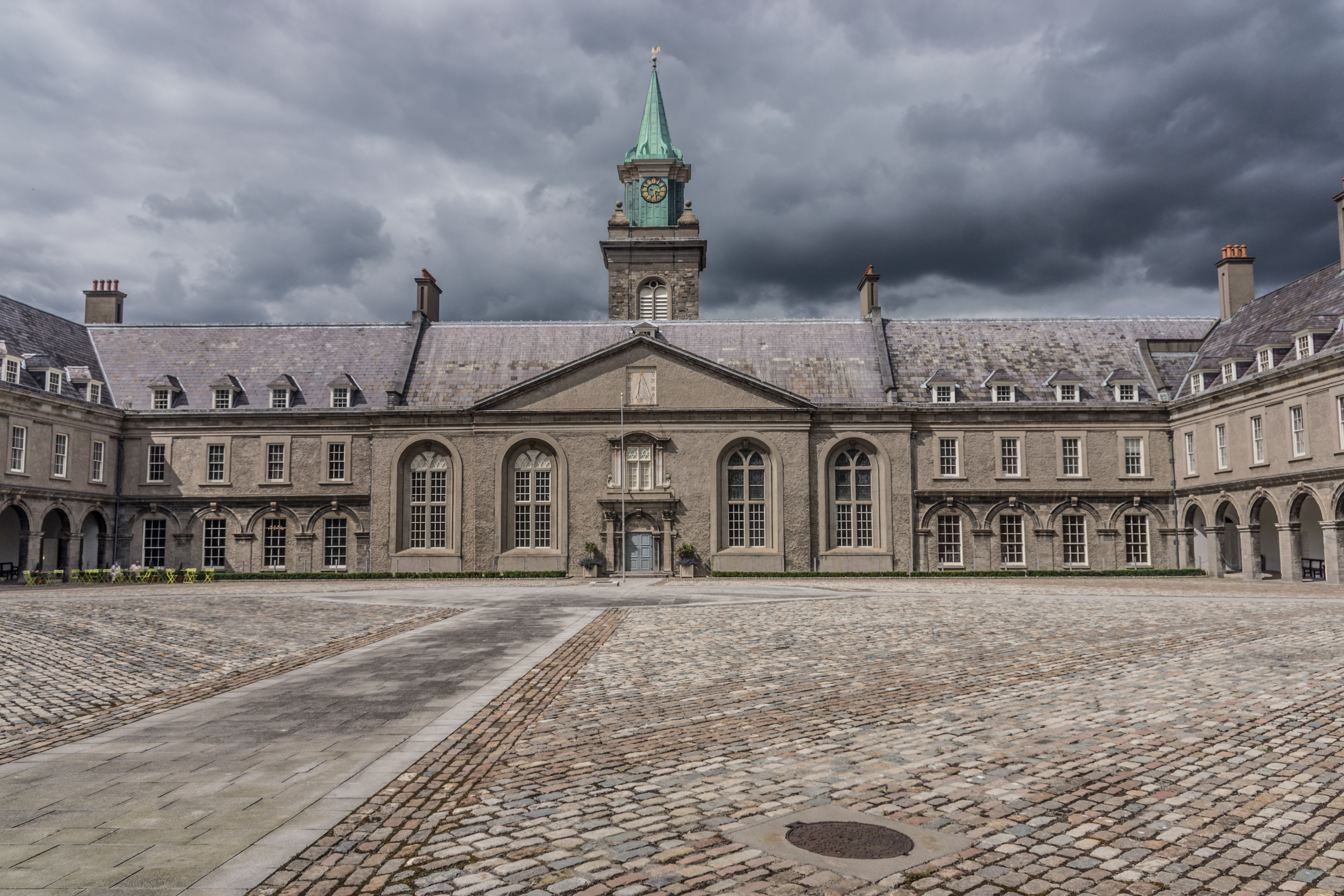
Courtyard of the IMMA

The Irish Museum of Modern Art (Irish: Áras Nua-Ealaíne na hÉireann), also known as IMMA, is Ireland's leading national institution for the collection and presentation of modern and contemporary art. It is located in Kilmainham, Dublin.

== History ==
Irish art collector Gordon Lambert met with Taoiseach Charles Haughey and "told him if the State would establish a gallery he would donate his collection." The Irish Museum of Modern Art was established by the Government of Ireland in 1990. It was officially opened on 25 May 1991 by Haughey.

Its first director was Declan McGonagle, who served for 10 years. He was followed by Enrique Juncosa, and then Sarah Glennie. Annie Fletcher has been Director since 2018.

== Building and grounds ==
The Irish Museum of Modern Art is housed in the 17th-century Royal Hospital Kilmainham. The Royal Hospital was founded in 1684 by James Butler, the Duke of Ormonde and Viceroy to Charles II, as a home for retired soldiers and continued in that use for almost 250 years.

The Royal Hospital is a striking location for displaying modern art. Designed by Sir William Robinson and modelled on Les Invalides in Paris, it is arranged around a courtyard and the interior has long corridors running along series of modest interlocking rooms. The original stables have been restored, extended and converted into artists' studios, and the museum runs an artist-in-residence programme.

Originally there was another option to build a new purpose-built museum in Dublin's docklands, but the Hospital proved to be the more pragmatic choice at the time, however "over the years... the lack of a large exhibition space has on occasion been a drawback." Additionally, the Royal Hospital lacked adequate storage and by 2003 up to 20 national and international works were discovered to be badly damaged by "humidity and temperature fluctuations". The Office of Public Works assisted in finding and relocating the bulk of the collection in off-site warehouses, and even a storage container in the museum's car park.

== Collection ==
IMMA holds the Irish National Collection of modern and contemporary art, consisting of over 3500 works by Irish and international artists. The collection's emphasis is on works produced post-1940 and features works by many significant artists including Lucian Freud, Marina Abramović, Louise Bourgeois, Joseph Cornell, Robert Rauschenberg, Sol LeWitt, Louis le Brocquy, Matt Mullican, Roy Lichtenstein and Lawrence Weiner. The collection is fully catalogued and searchable via a dedicated website.

The Hennessy Art Fund for IMMA Collection was launched in 2016 in part as a response to funding cuts preventing the museum from having a viable acquisitions budget to collect the work of emerging and mid-career artists since 2011. The fund is a multi-year corporate partnership and acquisition fund to purchase works by Irish and Irish based artists that are not yet part of the IMMA National Collection of Contemporary and Modern Art. Prior to this the museum relied heavily on private philanthropy. The Hennessy Art Fund has thus far allowed the collection to acquire the work of Kevin Atherton, David Beattie, Rhona Byrne and Dennis McNulty in 2016; and Ciarán Murphy, Maireád McClean, Mark Garry and Yuri Pattison in 2017 and Eimear Walshe.

== Events ==
IMMA hosts the annual Earth Rising Festival, which celebrates art, ecology and ideas related to planetary crises and brings together influential voices from across arts, science, academia, design, law, media, research and education.

The inaugural event was held in September 2023. The 2025 Earth Rising Festival is due to take place from 12 to 14 September 2025 inspired by the theme Staying with the Trouble, based on Donna Haraway's influential text. Contributors for 2025 include Sean McCabe, Fionnuala Moran, Easkey Britton, The Climate Alarm Clock Podcast, Mohammed Syfkhan and Professor John Barry.

== Legal status and funding ==
The museum is a company limited by guarantee and not having a share capital. The company is funded by grant-in-aid through the Department of Culture, Communications and Sport and by sponsorship, franchise and own resource income.

In addition to state grant-in-aid and commercial revenues, the museum has faced ongoing financial challenges related to legacy pension scheme liabilities and staff superannuation costs. Public financial disclosures and Oireachtas reports have highlighted that statutory pension commitments for retired personnel are funded on a pay-as-you-go basis through central Departmental allocations, periodically requiring supplementary Exchequer funding to address operational deficits and pay-and-pension shortfalls. In January, IMMA chairwoman Ali Curran wrote to Minister for Culture Patrick O’Donovan warning that the museum faced a funding deficit to pay its pensioners during the year, after receiving €45,000 from the Government despite requesting €321,000 to cover projected retirements, leaving a €275,000 shortfall.
