= Saint Maighneann =

Saint Maighneann was a Christian abbot in the 7th century who lived in Dublin, Ireland in an area now known as Kilmainham. Some of his teachings were recorded in a 15th-century manuscript titled A Life of St Maighneann, an Irish saint of the seventh century.

== History ==
Maighnean is thought to have lived during the first half of the 7th century CE. He set up his church on a ridge between two rivers, the River Liffey and the River Camac and presided there as abbot, though in some instances he is referred to with the title bishop. Maighneann was followed by twenty-seven monks who travelled with him during pilgrimages around the country. He visited several other Irish saints including Saint Maelruain of Tallaght, Saint Dublitir of Fingal and Saint Finnin of Strangford. While at Tallaght he made his confession to Saint Maelruain. Maelruain considered Maighneann lazy because he shied away from manual labour. Nonetheless, Maelruain praised Maighneann for keeping his ritual fire, which he kept constantly alight for over thirty years. Such was Maighneann's fame that the historic area of Kilmainham was named after his church "Cill Mhaighneann." Subsequently two famous buildings Kilmainham Priory, established by Strongbow after his invasion in 1169, and survived until it was suppressed by Henry VIII, and The Royal Hospital Kilmainham which was built by the Duke of Ormonde in 1680 occupied the same site.

Maighnean was also the subject of a 15th-century manuscript titled, A Life of St Maighneann, an Irish saint of the seventh century written by Ulliam Mac an Lega. In it, the manuscript contains a collection of his precepts on topics such as discipline and eschatology, and even a discussion on the Antichrist. Many of these discussions were derived from Maighnean's interactions with other saints that he visited during his lifetime.
