= Kilmainham Brooch =

Medieval Celtic brooch

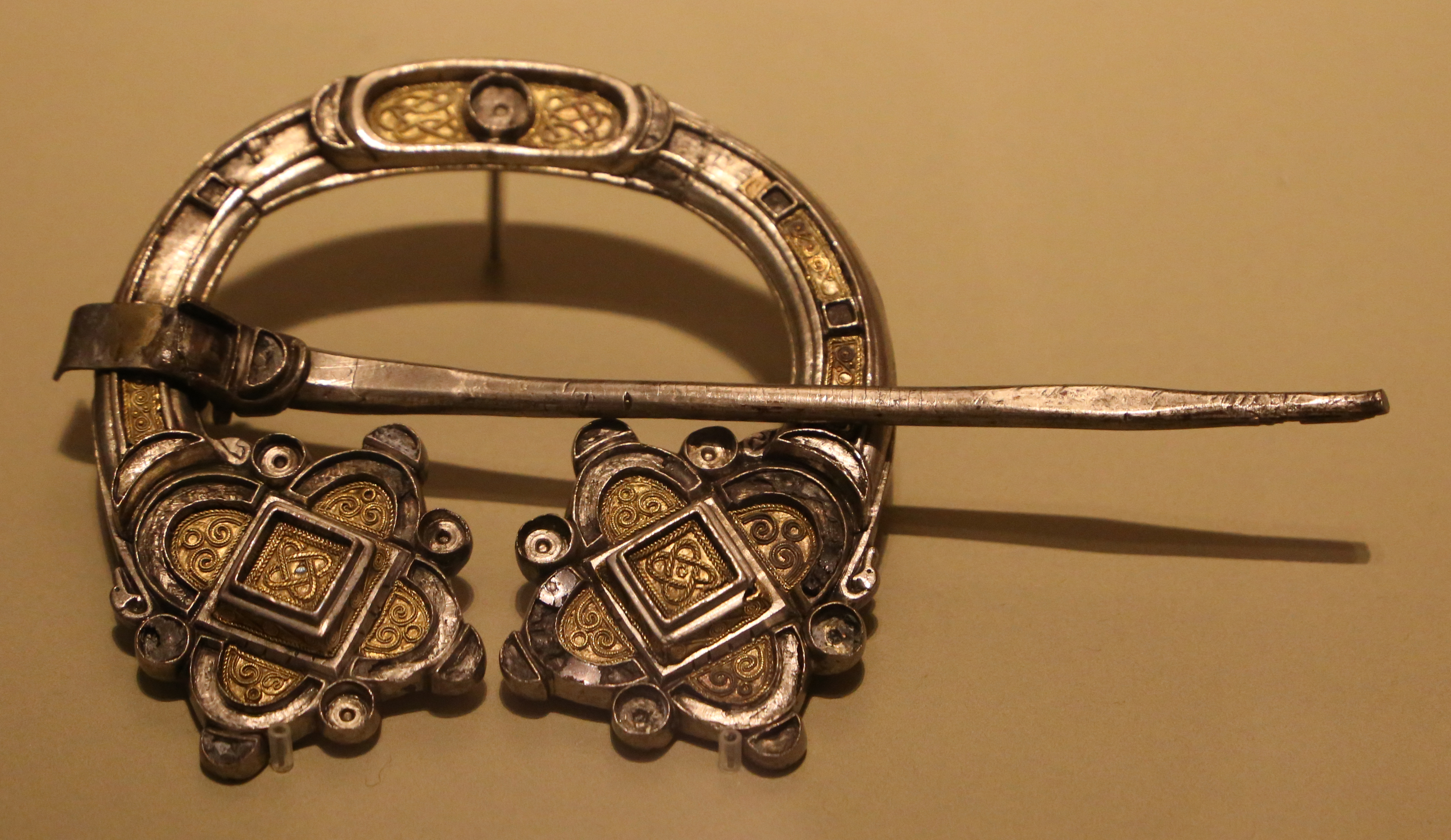
- Material: Silver, gold, enamel, glass
- Size: Diameter 9.67 cm (3.81 in)
- Created: Late 8th or early 9th century
- Period/culture: Celtic, Insular
- Place: Kilmainham, Dublin, Ireland
- Present location: National Museum of Ireland
- Identification: NMI, W45

The Kilmainham Brooch is a late 8th- or early 9th-century Celtic brooch of the "penannular" type (i.e. its ring does not fully close or is incomplete). With a diameter of 9.67 cm, it is a relatively large example and is made of silver, gold, and glass, with filigree and interlace decorations. Like other high-quality brooches of its class, it was probably intended to fasten copes and other vestments rather than for everyday wear, as its precious metal content would have made it a status symbol for its owner; less expensive Viking-style brooches were typically worn in pairs on women's clothing.

The brooch is dated to the late 8th or early 9th century, based on its 8th-century design patterns and the fact that silver was not readily available in Ireland until the first Viking invasion in AD 795. It was found in the 18th century during an excavation of a Viking burial place in Kilmainham, on the fringe of the city of Dublin in Ireland. Although established as being of Irish origin, its form and decorations seem heavily influenced by both Viking art (in material) and earlier Pictish metalwork (in design and technique). It is held at the Kildare Street, Dublin, branch of the National Museum of Ireland, where it is on permanent display in the "Treasury room".

== Description ==
The brooch is classed as a penannular ring because its ring is incomplete (it does not fully close). It is made from gold, silver and (mostly red) glass and enamel, and is similar in form and material to the better-known Tara and Hunterston Broochs.

The frame is made of cast silver and contains cells that once held gold spiral filigree and glass inserts, though some are now lost. The ring is outlined by double ridges in high relief, with flat areas reserved for decorative elements. Its top contains a wide oval compartment or cell bearing traces of red enamel, while the sides are formed from gold plates bounded by twisted wires and interlace decorations. The ring ends in two quadrilobate terminals (i.e., consisting of four lobes each), formed from a central square surrounded by semicircular or crescent lobes, three of which are free, while the fourth is shaped and attached to the arm of the ring itself. The format of the quatrefoil terminals has been compared to the opening folio for the Gospel of Luke in the c. AD 800 Book of Kells. The overall head is strap-like when viewed in cross-section.

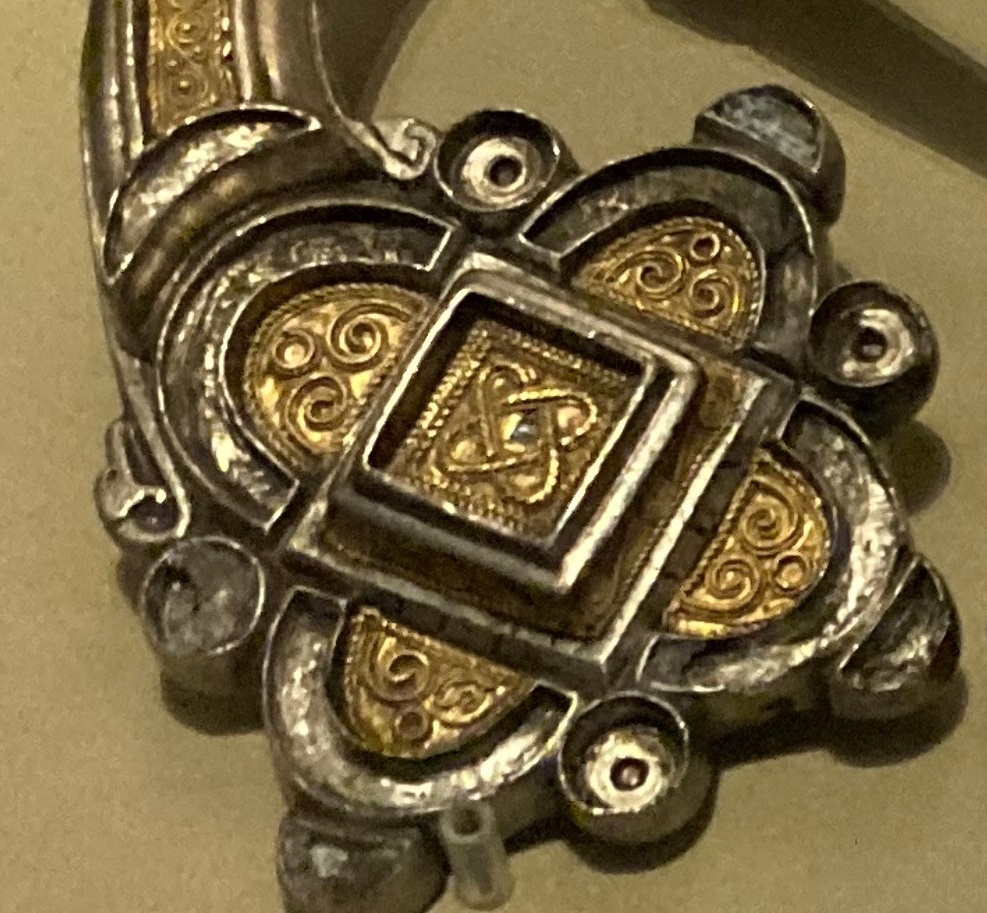
Detail of the left-hand terminal

The tracery on the curves of the ring is made up of interlaced bodies and legs of zoomorphic animals, including an Irish elk. Most of the original pin head is lost, with only its base remaining intact, and has traces of red enamel. The reverse is mostly flat but repeats the shape of the oval compartment on the front. It has some interlace designs, including two interlocking dogs.

The brooch's style has been described as of "Ecclesia-Gothio character" with "fine workmanship", and compared to the Tara example although "not so fine". Although described in 1989 as "probably Irish", it contains structural and decorative designs, including its lobed (i.e. "hanging") terminals, small cusps, and the cartouche on the hoop, are reminiscent of the Pictish-syle, indicating that it may be of Northumbrian origin (unlikely), or at least heavily influenced by that style.

Brooches of this type are the most common and thus studied form of surviving Irish and Scottish medieval metalworks due both to their then popularity and inherent durability. Examples such as the Kilmainham Brooch were crafted by skilled craftsmen in workshops using precious metals and were intended as status symbols for wealthy (and often female) commissioners.

== Dating ==
The Kilmainham Brooch is usually dated to the late 8th or early 9th centuries, as it is seen as transitional in both style and material. Its annular form and use of filigree place it in the 8th-century Irish tradition, while its use of silver, as opposed to gilding, indicates at earliest an early 9th-century origin, that is in the period after the 795 AD Viking invasions of Ireland, when silver became more available to native metalworkers.

== Provenance ==
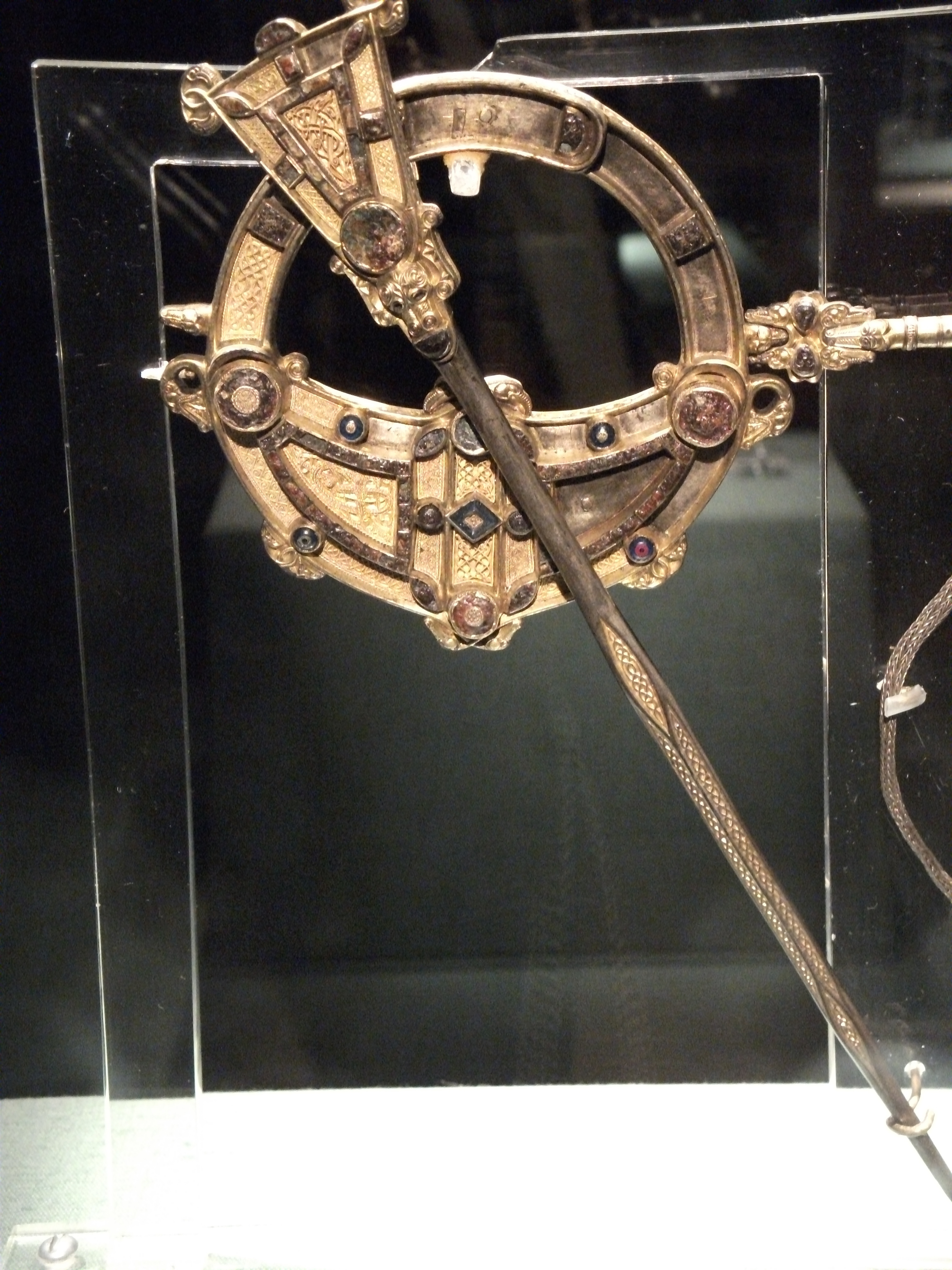
The Tara Brooch, AD 650–750

It was found in the mid-18th century at a late 9th- and early 10th-century Viking burial site at Kilmainham, County Dublin, Ireland, alongside swords and other artifacts of Scandinavian origin or influence. After further excavations in the 21st century, the area of Kilmainham-Islandbridge was described by historian Stephen Harrison as "demonstrably the largest burial complex of its type in western Europe, Scandinavia excluded".

The find-spot was near the ruins of a late-medieval hospice run by the Saint John of Jerusalem Order of Templars. Its earliest recorded ownership dates to the late 18th century, when it was in the collection of Ralph Ouseley of County Sligo. Today it is held by the archeology branch of the National Museum of Ireland on Kildare Street, Dublin, having been acquired by the Royal Irish Academy before 1853.

=== Replicas ===
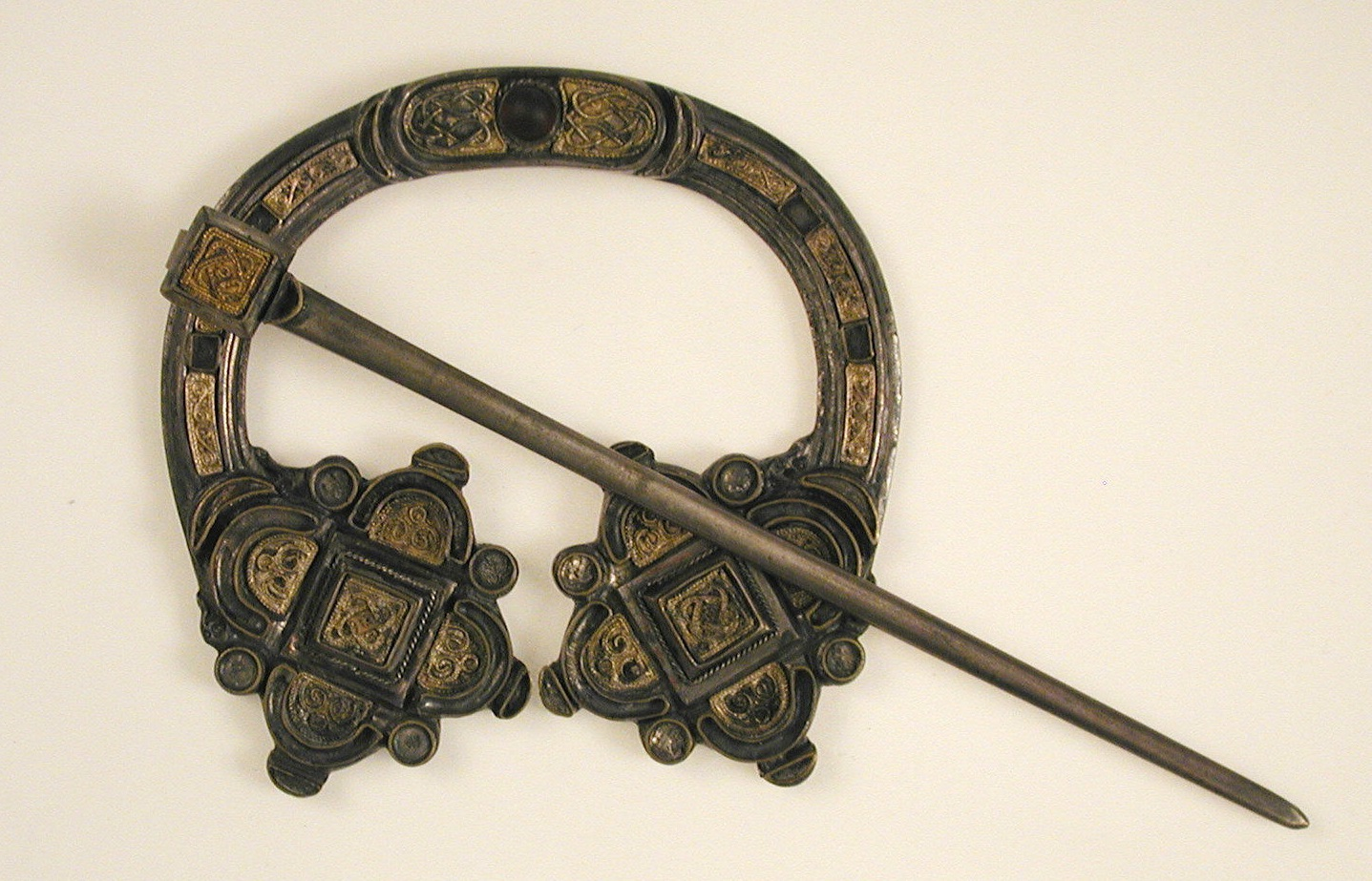
Early 20th century copy at the Metropolitan Museum of Art, New York

The mid-19th century copy in Victoria and Albert Museum, London, is from George Waterhouse, a jeweller from Sheffield, England, who moved to Dublin in 1842, and exhibited the Tara and Kilmainham Brooches, and their replicas, at the 1851 Great Exhibition (or "Crystal Palace Exhibition"). An early 20th-century bronze and gilt replica is in the Metropolitan Museum of Art, New York. Both were produced during the Celtic Revival when there was high demand for replicas of objects from Ireland's medieval period, particularly from its "Golden Age of Irish Art", roughly AD 700–1200 (especially for metalwork).

Replicas of the brooch were given the "celebrity" title of the "Knight Templar Brooch" to increase its market value as nationalistic shawl-pins. Adolf Mahr later dismissed the trend for giving brooches —and more importantly, their replicas— such titles as "fanciful ... and sometimes ridiculous ... by a firm of Dublin jewellers". The V&A acquired its copy at the 1851 Exhibition.

== Sources ==
- Briggs, Stephen. "The Roscrea Brooch Re-Provenanced?". Ulster Journal of Archaeology, volume 74, 2017. JSTOR 26788433
- Coffey, George; Armstrong, E.C.R. "Scandinavian Objects Found at Island-Bridge and Kilmainham". Proceedings of the Royal Irish Academy: Archaeology, Culture, History, Literature, volume 28, 1910. JSTOR 25502780
- De Paor, Liam. "The Christian Triumph: The Golden Age". In: Treasures of early Irish art, 1500 B.C. to 1500 A.D: From the collections of the National Museum of Ireland, Royal Irish Academy, Trinity College Dublin Archived 6 June 2021 at the Wayback Machine. NY: Metropolitan Museum of Art, 1977. ISBN 978-0-8709-9164-6
- Henderson, George; Henderson, Isabel. The Art of the Picts: Sculpture and Metalwork in Early Medieval Scotland. Thames and Hudson, 2004. ISBN 978-0-5002-8963-1
- Johnson, Edmond. Description and history of Irish antique art metal work. Dublin: Sealy, Bryers and Walker, 1893
- Moss, Rachel. Medieval c. 400—c. 1600: Art and Architecture of Ireland. New Haven (CT): Yale University Press, 2014. ISBN 978-0-3001-7919-4
- Ó Floinn, Raghnal; Wallace, Patrick (eds). Treasures of the National Museum of Ireland: Irish Antiquities. Dublin: National Museum of Ireland, 2002. ISBN 978-0-7171-2829-7
- Youngs, Susan (ed). The Work of Angels: Masterpieces of Celtic Metalwork: 6th to 9th Centuries. Austin (TX): University of Texas Press, 1989. ISBN 978-02927-9058-2
