= Boothby baronets of Friday Hill (1660) =

Escutcheon of the Boothby baronets of Friday Hill

The Boothby baronetcy, of Friday Hill in the parish of Chingford in the County of Essex, was created in the Baronetage of England on 9 November 1660 for Thomas Boothby. He was the son of Robert Boothby of Chingford and his wife Mary Hyer, daughter of George Hyer. The marriage brought him the manor of Weston in Shere, near Albury.

The title became extinct on the death of his son, Thomas, the 2nd Baronet, in 1669, who left no male heir; his estates passed to his brother Robert.

== Boothby baronets, of Friday Hill (1660) ==
- Sir Thomas Boothby, 1st Baronet (c. 1622–1661)
- Sir Thomas Boothby, 2nd Baronet (c. 1645–1669)
