= Sir William Boothby, 4th Baronet =

General Sir William Boothby Bt
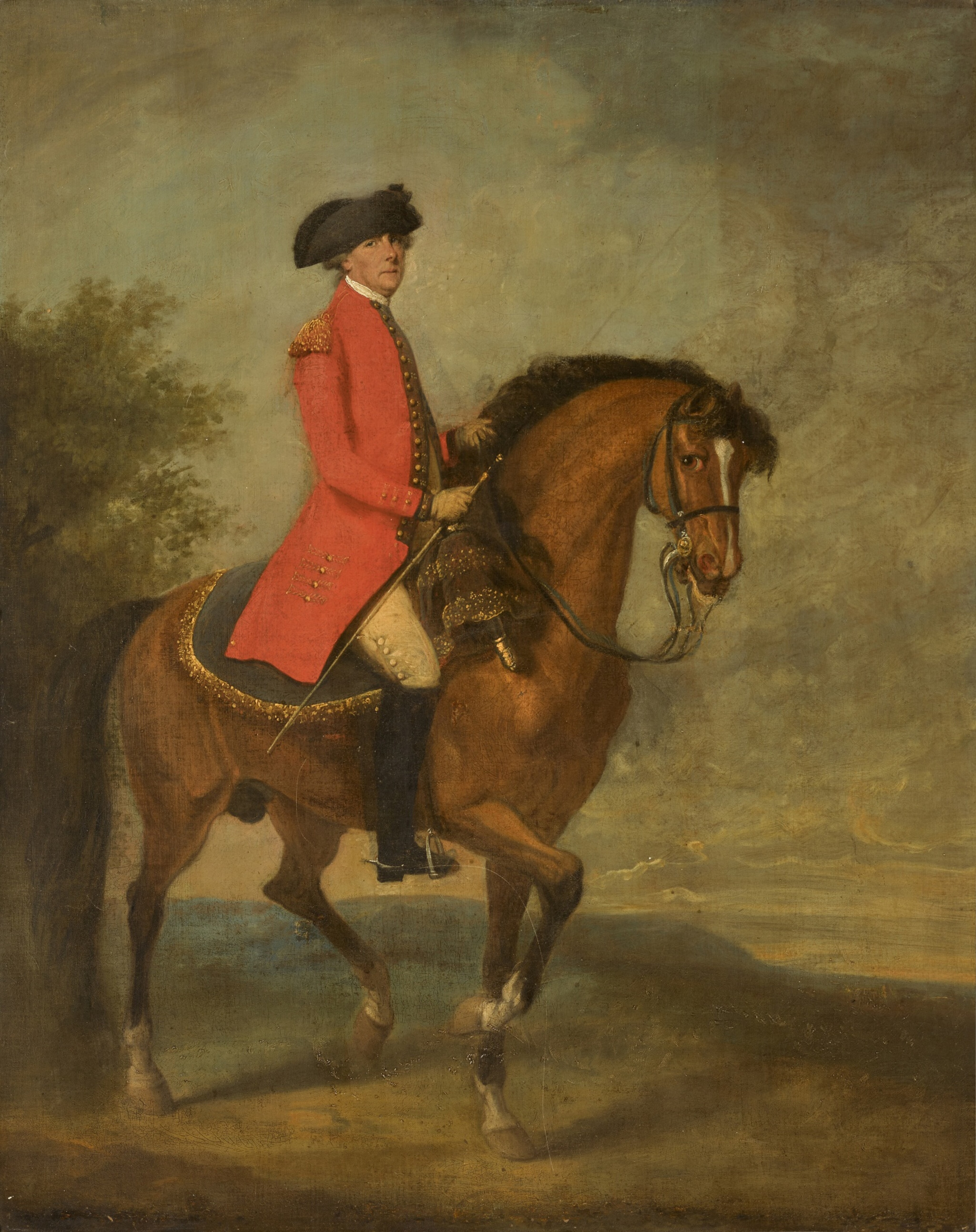
- Portrait by David Morier

Personal details
- Born: 4 May 1721
- Died: 15 April 1787 (aged 65)

General Sir William Boothby, 4th Baronet (4 May 1721 – 15 April 1787) was a British Army officer and one of the Boothby baronets.

Boothby saw active service during the Seven Years' War.

He was colonel of the 50th Regiment of Foot.

Military offices
Preceded by Edward Carr	Colonel of the 50th Regiment of Foot; 1764–1774	Succeeded by Michael O'Brien Dilkes
Baronetage of England
Preceded by William Boothby	Baronet (of Broadlow Ash); 1731-1787	Succeeded by Brooke Boothby
