= Royal Hospital Kilmainham =

Former hospital in Dublin, Ireland

- Ospidéal Ríochta Chill Mhaighneann
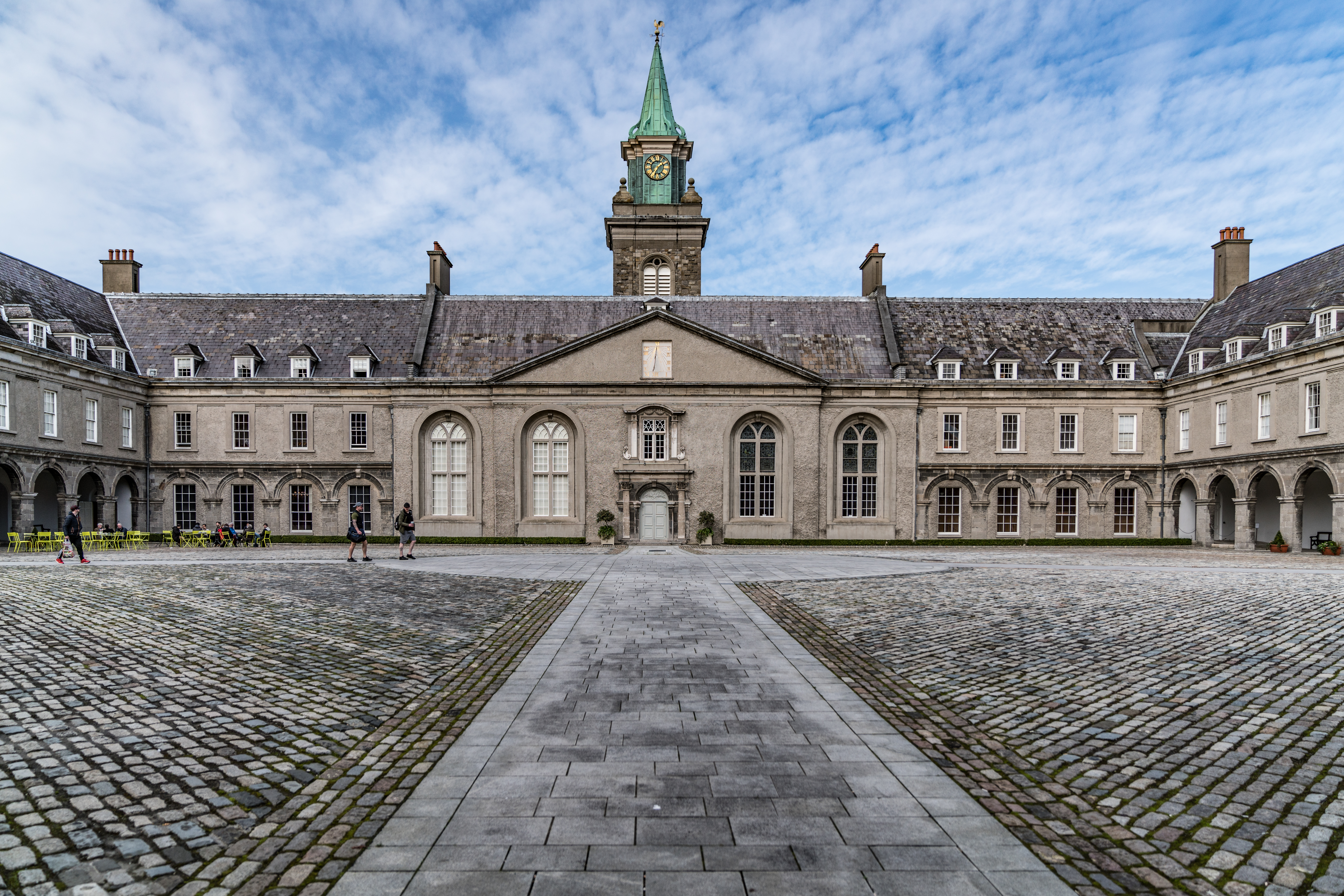
- Royal Hospital Kilmainham

General information
- Type: Hospital and retirement home
- Architectural style: Classical, Baroque
- Location: Kilmainham, Dublin, Ireland
- Coordinates: 53.3433°N 6.3001°W
- Current tenants: Irish Museum of Modern Art
- Construction started: 1679
- Estimated completion: 1687
- Owner: Office of Public Works

Technical details
- Material: granite, calp limestone

Design and construction
- Architect: William Robinson
- Known for: The first classical and secular building of scale in Ireland.

Renovating team
- Architect: Thomas Burgh (1702-13)

The Royal Hospital Kilmainham (Irish: Ospidéal Ríochta Chill Mhaighneann) in Kilmainham, Dublin, is a 17th-century former hospital and retirement home which is now mainly used to house the Irish Museum of Modern Art and as a concert and events venue.

It is notable as being the first large secular building in Ireland as well as being the first large classical building in Ireland. It remains one of the few 17th-century buildings in Dublin that are still extant.

== History ==
=== Prior of St John and Kilmainham Castle ===
A priory, founded in 1174 by Strongbow, existed on the site until the Crown closed it down in the Dissolution of the Monasteries in the 1530s. It was the main centre of the Knights Hospitaller in Ireland and formed part of the Manor of Kilmainham.

=== Commissioning, design and construction ===
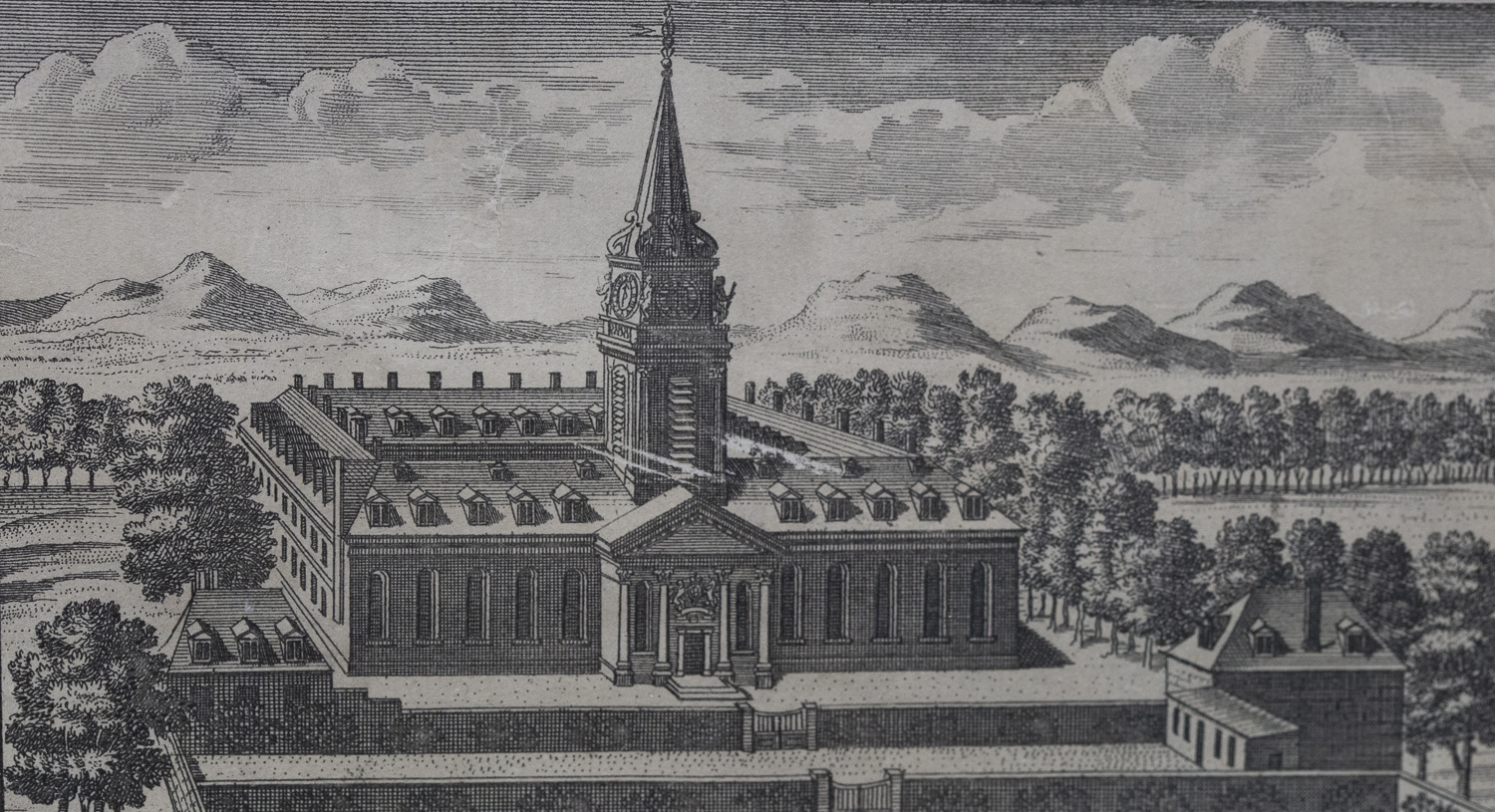
An early illustration of the hospital taken from Charles Brooking's map of Dublin (1728)

The hospital was built as a home for retired soldiers of the Irish Army by Sir William Robinson, Surveyor General for James Butler, 1st Duke of Ormond, Lord Lieutenant of Ireland, between 1679 and 1687 on what was then a portion of the Phoenix Park.

Colonel John Jeffreys of Brecon, an old Welsh soldier who had served the Crown loyally during the English Civil War, was appointed the first Master, at a salary of £300 per annum. The hospital got off to a bad start financially: from a petition presented by Jeffreys to King James II in 1686, it seems that most of the original sources of funding had dried up.

The building was inspired by Les Invalides in Paris which also has a formal facade and a large enclosed courtyard. Along with Les Invalides, it served as the model for the Royal Hospital, Chelsea, begun the next year under the guidance of Christopher Wren.

The Richmond Tower at the end of the formal avenue leading to the Royal Hospital was designed by Francis Johnston. This gateway originally stood beside the river Liffey at Bloody Bridge (now Rory O'More Bridge), but had to be moved after the arrival of the railway in 1844 increased traffic congestion. He had placed his personal coat of arms above the arch, concealed by a piece of wood painted to match the stone, his idea being that his arms would be revealed to future generations after the wood became rotten. However, his little trick was uncovered when the gateway was taken down for removal. The coat of arms at present on the gateway is that of the Royal Hospital.

The Royal Hospital Kilmainham graveyards, including Bully's Acre, are 400 metres to the west. A cross-shaft in the former cemetery may be the remains of a boundary cross associated with a ninth-century monastery located at this site.

=== Hospital closure and repurposing ===
Following the creation of the Irish Free State the Royal Hospital was considered as a potential home for Oireachtas Éireann, the new Irish national parliament. Eventually, it was decided to keep parliament in its temporary home in Leinster House. The Hospital remained the home of a dwindling number of soldiers until it closed in 1927. It was then variously used by the Garda Síochána and as a storage location for property belonging to the National Museum of Ireland. The large statue of Queen Victoria which used to sit in the forecourt of Leinster House, before its removal in 1948, was stored in the main courtyard of the Hospital, as were various state carriages, including the state coach of the Lord Chancellor of Ireland. The Royal Hospital in Kilmainham was finally restored by the Irish Government in 1984 and opened as the Irish Museum of Modern Art (IMMA).

During a 1987 visit to Ireland, Australian prime minister Bob Hawke was honoured with a dinner at the Royal Hospital hosted by Taoiseach Charlie Haughey.

Every year on the National Day of Commemoration—the anniversary of the Truce that ended the Irish War of Independence, celebrated on the Sunday nearest 11 July–the President of Ireland lays a wreath in the courtyard in memory of all Irishmen and Irishwomen who have died in wars and on service with the United Nations. The ceremony includes members of the Government of Ireland, members of Dáil Éireann and of Seanad Éireann, the Council of State, the Defence Forces, the Judiciary and the Diplomatic Corps.

== Concert and events venue ==
Since the beginning of the 21st century, the grounds have become a popular location for concerts and events. Festival such as Forbidden Fruit and acts such as Blur, Damien Rice, Tame Impala, Kodaline and Patti Smith have played there. The Frames played their 30th-anniversary show on 28 May 2022 for an audience of about 10,000.

== Gallery ==
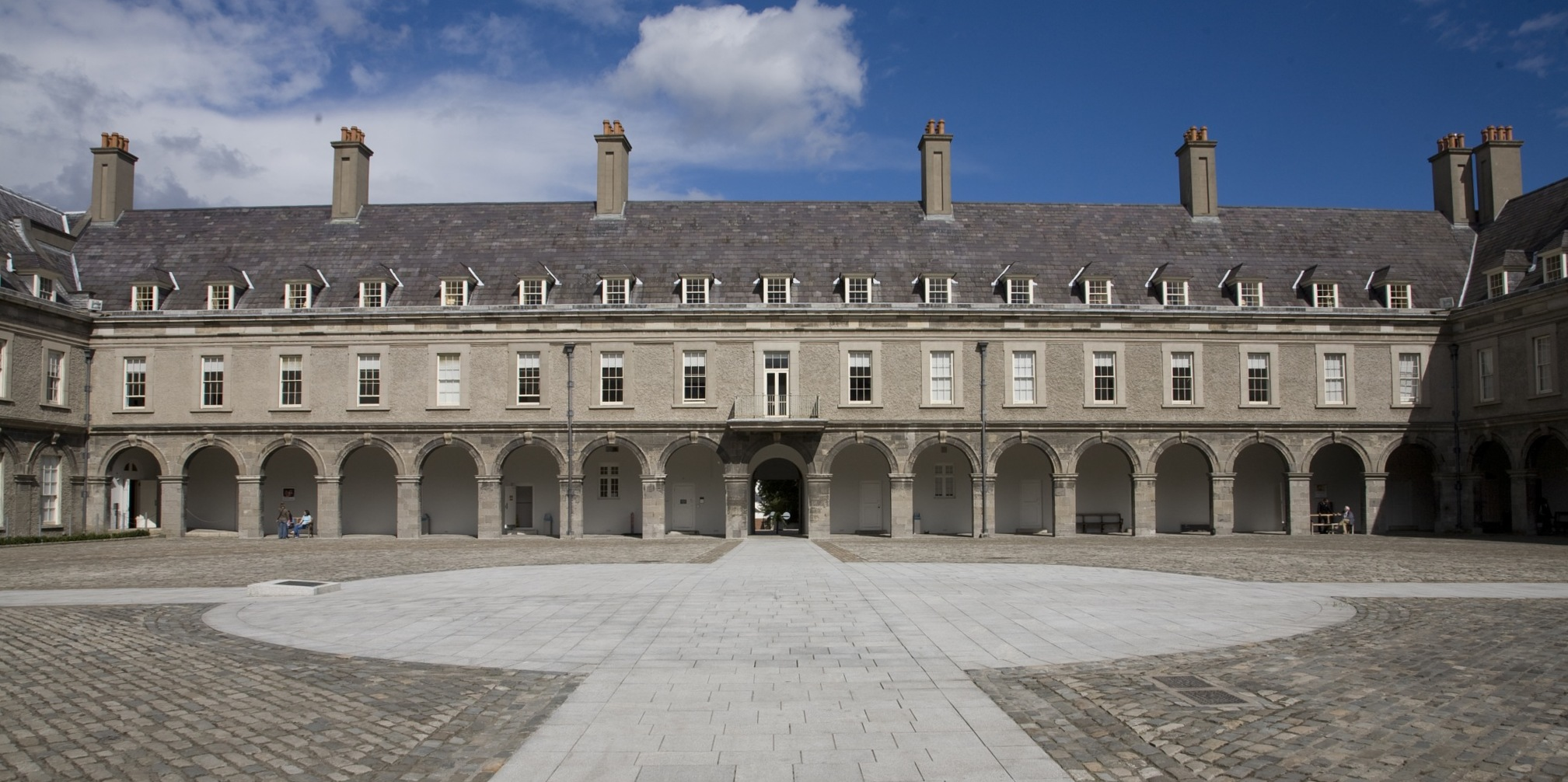
Courtyard

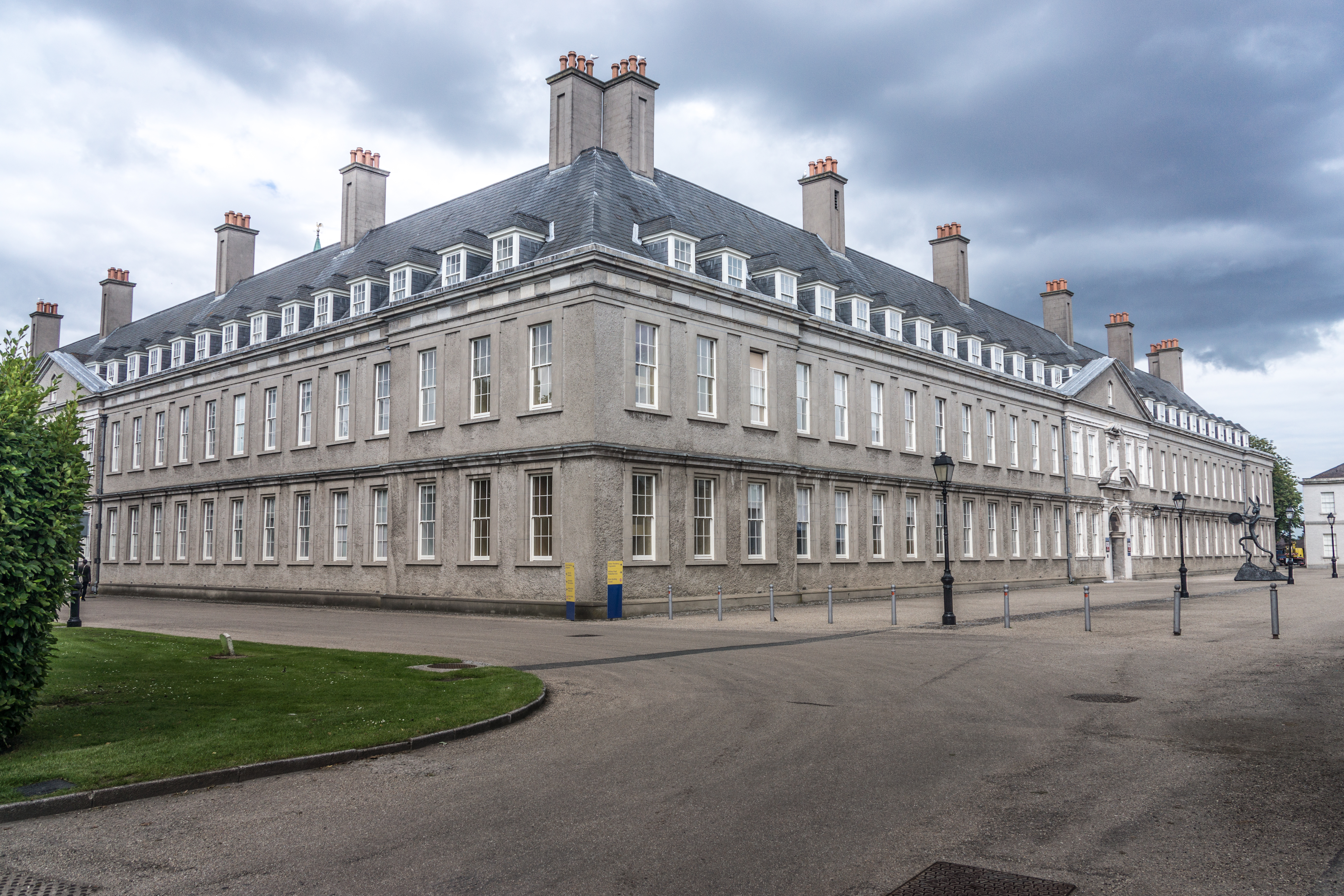
Main frontage

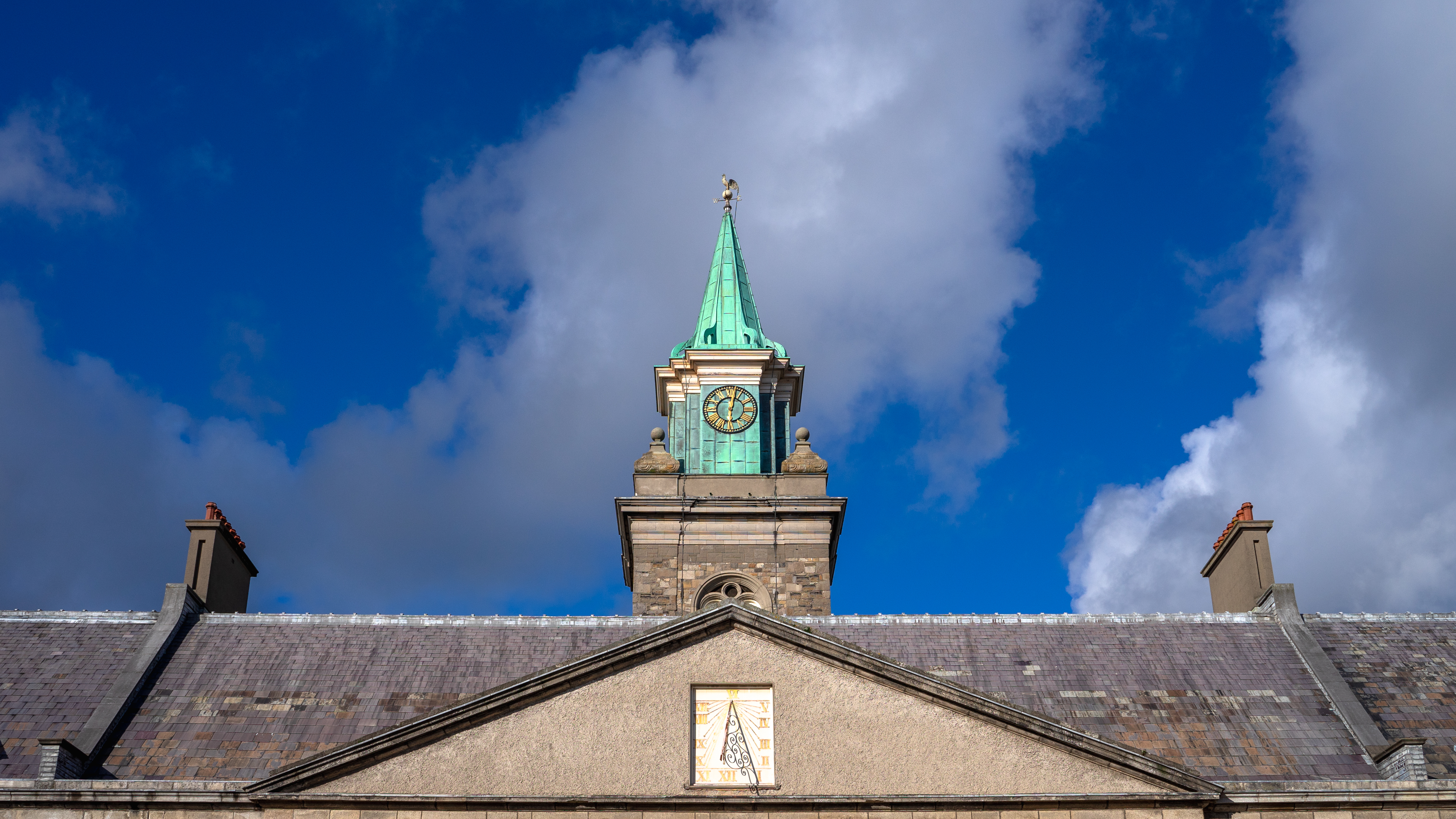
The Clocktower on the north side of the Courtyard

== See also ==
- Kilmainham Gaol
- Royal Hospital Chelsea (equivalent in London)
- Institution des Invalides de la Legion Etrangere (French Foreign Legion equivalent)
