= Scott Boothby =

American hammer thrower

Scott Boothby is a male hammer thrower from the United States. Boothby is ranked among the top 20 Throwers (All-Time) in USA Track and Field History (Throwing Event-Hammer Throw) by Track and Field News Magazine. He was a two-time member of the US track and field team and participated in 3 Olympic Team Trials for Team USA (1996, 2000, 2004). His best distance achieved was 243 feet 5 inches (2005). Ranked among the top 50 throwers in the United States each year between 1995 and 2010 (he was one of the world's top throwers in 2005 IAAF RANKED).

Boothby was an alternate on the 2005 World Championship Team (Helsinki) with a 4th-place finish at the 2005 USA National Championships. He competed actively from 1995 to 2011 and was a Division 1 NCAA All-American (2 times) for Idaho State University (1996/1997), where he set school and Big Sky Conference Records.

In 2006 after initially retiring from competition for a full year, he was given an out of competition test, which revealed Finasteride and 6-oxo, an over-the-counter supplement. Boothby initially got eight years of ineligibility (August 1, 2006 until July 31, 2014) and disqualification of all results from June 25, 2006.[1] The ban was later lifted and he was fully reinstated after it was found that he had not attempted to enhance his performance and that finasteride was no longer an IAAF banned substance. Finasteride is also known under the name Propecia and was/is a prescription hair loss drug. The substance 6-oxo was found to be from an over the counter food supplement that Boothby proved he had purchased from General Nutrition Corporation with good intent. (see USADA case 2006 findings ) (GNC).[2]
