= Kilmainham =

Suburb of Dublin, Ireland

Kilmainham Cill Mhaighneann (Irish)
- Inner suburb
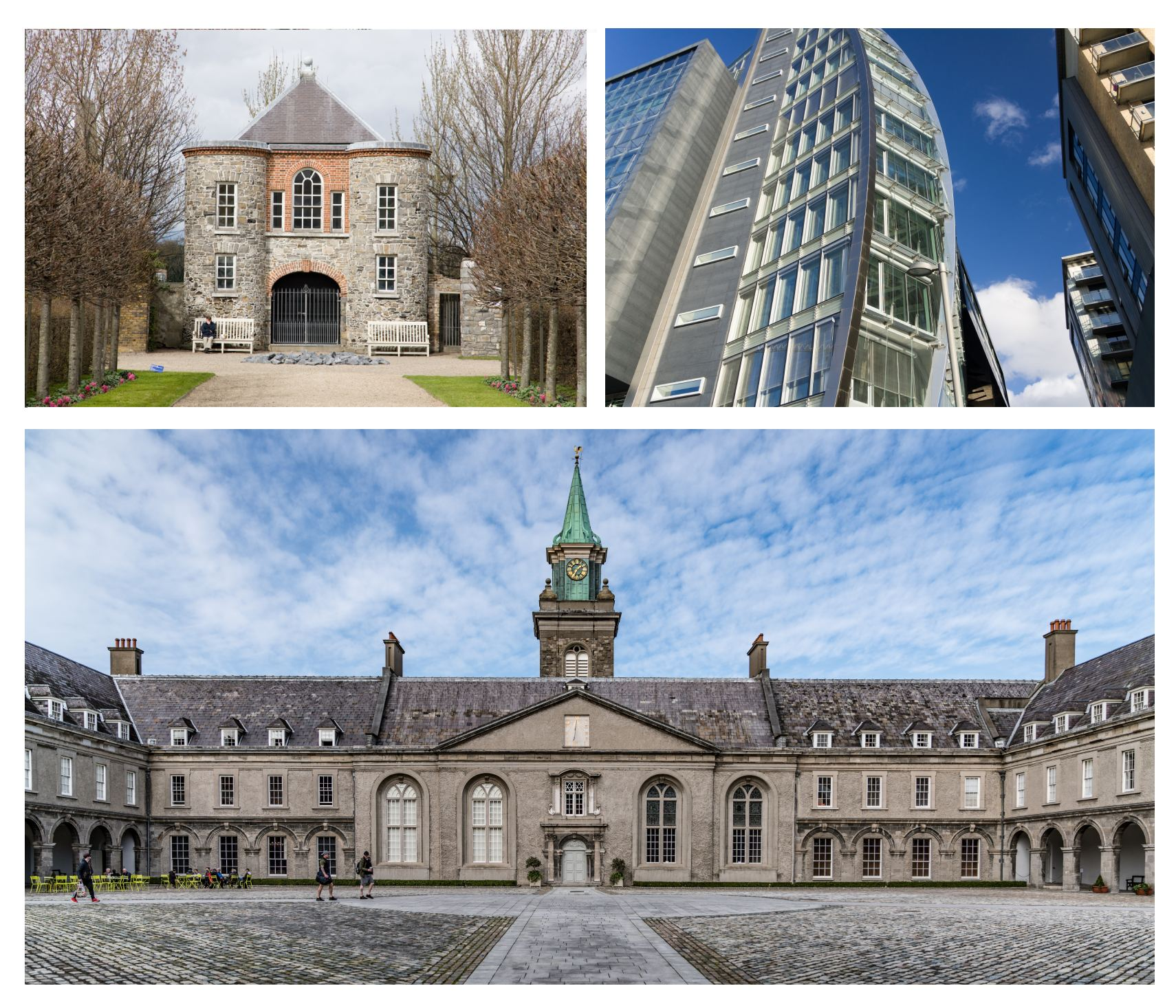
- Clockwise from top: The gardens at the Royal Hospital Kilmainham; Heuston South Quarter; the Irish Museum of Modern Art at Royal Hospital Kilmainham

- Location in Dublin Location in Ireland
- Coordinates: 53.3431°N 6.3215°W
- Country: Ireland
- Province: Leinster
- County: County Dublin
- City: Dublin

Government
  - Dáil constituency: Dublin South-Central
  - Local authority: Dublin City Council

Kilmainham (Irish: Cill Mhaighneann, meaning 'St Maighneann's church') is a south inner suburb of Dublin, Ireland, south of the River Liffey and west of the city centre. It is in the city's Dublin 8 and Dublin 10 postal districts. The area, which was the site of a monastery from the 7th century and Viking settlement from the 8th century, is home to a number of 17th and 19th century buildings including the Royal Hospital Kilmainham (now housing the Irish Museum of Modern Art) and Kilmainham Gaol (now a museum).

== History ==
Kilmainham's foundation dates to the early Christian period, with the monastery of Cell Maignenn (Cill Mhaighneann in modern Irish) established by the year 606. By 795, the ecclesiastical site, located on the ridge of land at the confluence of the Liffey and the Camac, may still have been the only substantial structure along the Liffey's banks.

The Kilmainham Brooch, a late 8th- or early 9th-century Celtic brooch of the "penannular" type (i.e. its ring does not fully close or is incomplete) was unearthed in the area.

In the wake of the Viking settlement of nearby Dublin from 841, Vikings were present in Kilmainham too, one of a number of villages that stretched up the river bank to Clondalkin.

Viking cemeteries at the site of the monastery and at nearby Islandbridge were discovered during gravel quarrying, railroad works and the preparation of the War Memorial Gardens. Dozens of pagan burials with grave goods, dating to the 9th century, have been recorded. The burial sites taken together constitute the largest known Viking cemetery in western Europe outside Scandinavia. Many of the artefacts from these sites, discovered primarily during industrial, transport and park works in the 18th and 19th centuries, form part of the collection at the National Museum of Ireland.

The Battle of Islandbridge took place in the area in 919, with Viking forces under Sitric Cáech defeating Gaelic Irish forces under high king Niall Glúndub. In 1013, Murchad, the son of Brian Boru, is recorded by the annals as having raided into Leinster as far as Kilmainham.

In the 12th century, in the wake of the Norman invasion of Ireland, the lands on the banks of the Liffey were granted to the Knights Hospitaller. Strongbow erected for them a castle about 2 kilometres or 1 mile distant from the Danish wall of old Dublin; and Hugh Tyrrel, first Baron Castleknock, granted them part of the lands which now form the Phoenix Park. The Knights of St. John of Jerusalem remained in possession of the land until the dissolution of the monasteries in the 16th century.

Until the time of Queen Elizabeth, when Dublin Castle became the centre of English power, the Lord Lieutenants often held court at the manor of Kilmainham. In 1559, Thomas Radclyffe, 3rd Earl of Sussex, on being again appointed Lord Lieutenant, found that the building at Kilmainham had been damaged by a storm, and had to hold court at the palace of St. Sepulchre. The following year Elizabeth ordered that Dublin Castle be upgraded to enable the Lord Lieutenant to reside there, and Kilmainham fell out of favour.

The Royal Hospital Kilmainham, constructed on the site where the Knights of St. John of Jerusalem had their priory, was completed in the late 17th century. It now houses the Irish Museum of Modern Art.

The Manor of Kilmainham formed a liberty outside the jurisdiction of the city of Dublin, with its own rights and privileges. The manor took in parts of James's Street and side streets and stretched as far as Lucan and Chapelizod. After the Reformation, former lords (or chairmen, as they were later called) of this manor included Lord Cloncurry and Sir Edward Newenham. John "Bully" Egan, from Charleville, County Cork, was chairman from 1790 to 1800. These manorial rights were abolished after the Municipal Corporations (Ireland) Act 1840, and much of the area was included within the city.

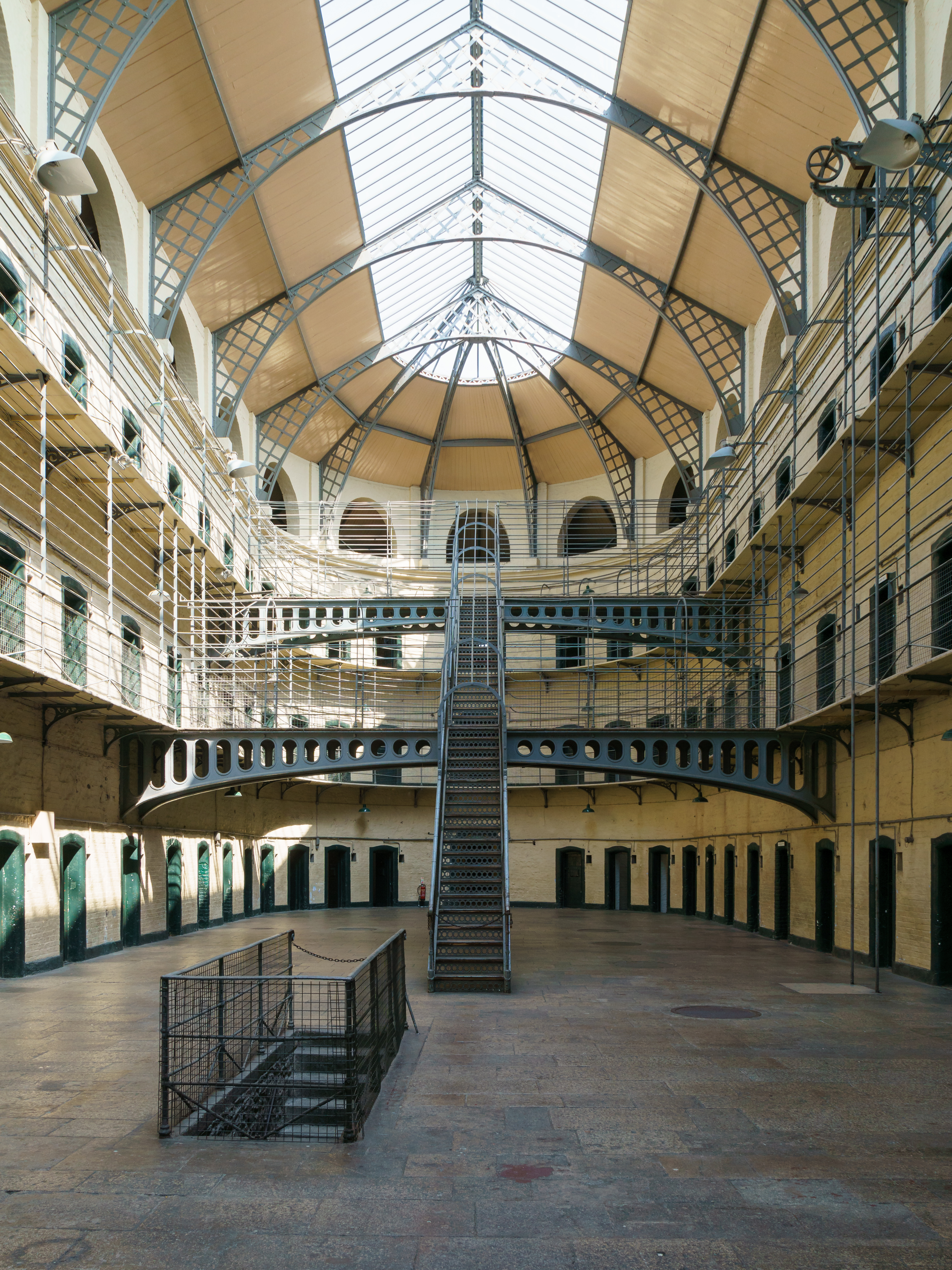
Interior of Kilmainham Gaol

Kilmainham Gaol was constructed in the area between 1786 and 1796 to replace an earlier prison located near present-day Mount Brown (an area bordering Kilmainham and Saint James's). The gaol was later be the site of the executions of the leaders of the 1916 Easter Rising.

At the time of the 1841 census, there were 670 people living in Kilmainham.

The portion still outside the city in the latter part of the 19th century was within the township of New Kilmainham, a municipality governed by town commissioners first established under the Towns Improvement (Ireland) Act 1854 in 1867 and then given additional powers under a local act, the New Kilmainham Township Act 1868 (31 & 32 Vict. c. cx). New Kilmainham comprised the townlands of Kilmainham, Goldenbridge North, Inchicore North, Inchicore South and Butchers Arms, in addition to a small part of the townland of Jamestown. Its total area was 580 acres (230 ha) and the population was 5,391 in 1881 and 6,519 in 1891. It became an urban district under the Local Government (Ireland) Act 1898. In 1900, the urban district was abolished and the area was transferred from the county into the jurisdiction of the city of Dublin as the New Kilmainham ward.

== Geography ==
Kilmainham lies to the west of Dublin city centre, south of the River Liffey and north of the Grand Canal. The River Camac runs through the area and is crossed by bridges at the South Circular Road, Rowserstown Lane and Bow Lane. The Richmond Tower at the Royal Kilmainham Hospital marks the junction between the formal pedestrianised avenue leading to the Royal Hospital, and the South Circular Road.

Dublin Heuston railway station, one of Dublin's three main railway stations, is nearby.

== Notable people ==
Former or current residents of the area have included:

- Maeve Higgins, comedian
- Brian Kennedy, singer-songwriter
- Gina Moxley, playwright and actress
- Kathryn Thomas, television personality
