= Sir Brooke Boothby, 10th Baronet =

British diplomat

Sir Brooke Boothby, 10th Baronet (13 November 1856 – 22 January 1913) was a British baronet and diplomat.

Born at Welwyn Rectory in Hertfordshire, he was the son of Sir Brooke Boothby, 9th Baronet. His mother was Martha Serena Boothby, the eldest daughter of Charles, in turn younger son of Sir William Bootby, 7th Baronet. He succeeded his father as baronet in 1865, aged nine. Boothby was educated at Harrow School and joined the Diplomatic Service in 1881. A year later he was advanced to an attaché and in 1884 was gazetted a third secretary. Four years thereafter he was promoted to second secretary.

Boothby was sent as first secretary to Rio de Janeiro in 1898 and was transferred to Tokyo as Secretary of Legion in 1901. After a year he appointed to the same position at the embassy in Brussels in August 1902, and in 1905 became counsellor of embassy in Vienna. Boothby was appointed Envoy Extraordinary and Minister Plenipotentiary to the Republic of Chile in 1907, but did not proceed there to take up the post, owing to the state of his health.

Boothby died unmarried and childless. He was succeeded in the baronetcy by his younger brother Charles.

== Notes ==
Baronetage of England
Preceded by Brooke Boothby	Baronet (of Broadlow Ash); 1865–1913	Succeeded by Charles Boothby
