= Boothby baronets =

Set index for Boothby baronets

There have been two baronetcies created for persons with the surname Boothby, both in the Baronetage of England. One creation is extant as of 2026.

- Boothby baronets of Broadlow Ash (1660): the related earlier Boothby baronetcy of Clater Cote (1644) was not formally created, in the circumstances of the English Civil War.
- Boothby baronets of Friday Hill (1660)
