= Dublin Contemporary =

2011 art festival in Dublin, Ireland

Dublin Contemporary 2011
- Date: September 9 – October 31, 2011
- Venue: Earlsfort Terrace
- Location: Dublin, Ireland
- Type: Contemporary Art quintennial
- Theme: Terrible Beauty—Art, Crisis, Change
- Motive: Cultural tourism
- Budget: €2.5 - 4.5 million
- Participants: Alexandre Arrechea, Kader Attia, Nina Berman, Jorge Méndez Blake, Monica Bonvicini, The Bruce High Quality Foundation, Fernando Bryce, Ella Burke (Ella de Búrca), Matt Calderwood, Cleary & Connolly, James Coleman, Amanda Coogan, Willie Doherty, Wang Du, Maarten Vanden Eynde, Omer Fast, mounir fatmi, Hans Peter Feldmann, Kendell Geers, David Godbold, Conor Harrington, Thomas Hirschhorn, Katie Holten, Jaki Irvine, Kysa Johnson, Patrick Jolley, Jim Lambie, Brian Maguire, Richard Mosse, Alice Neel, Manuel Ocampo, Brian O'Doherty, Niamh O'Malley, Dan Perjovschi, William Powhida, Wilfredo Prieto, Guy Richards Smit, Marinella Senatore, Will St Leger, Superflex, Javier Téllez, Vedovamazzei, Corban Walker, Patrick Hamilton, Lisa Yuskavage

Dublin Contemporary was a large-scale, international, contemporary art festival held in Dublin between 6 September and 31 October 2011. Originally planned to occur every 5 years, it was only held once, and amidst controversy and criticism.

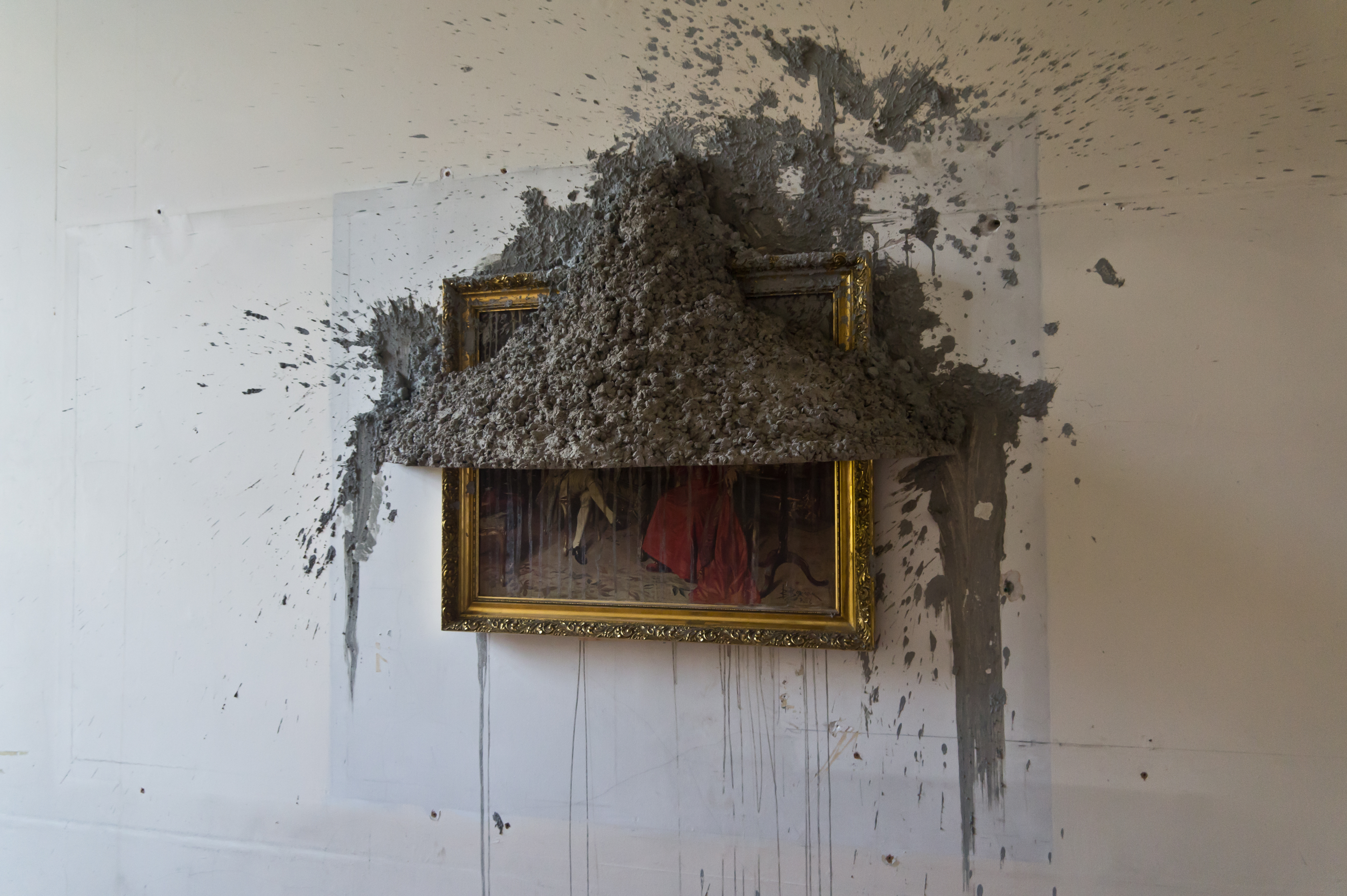
Alejandro Almanza Pereda

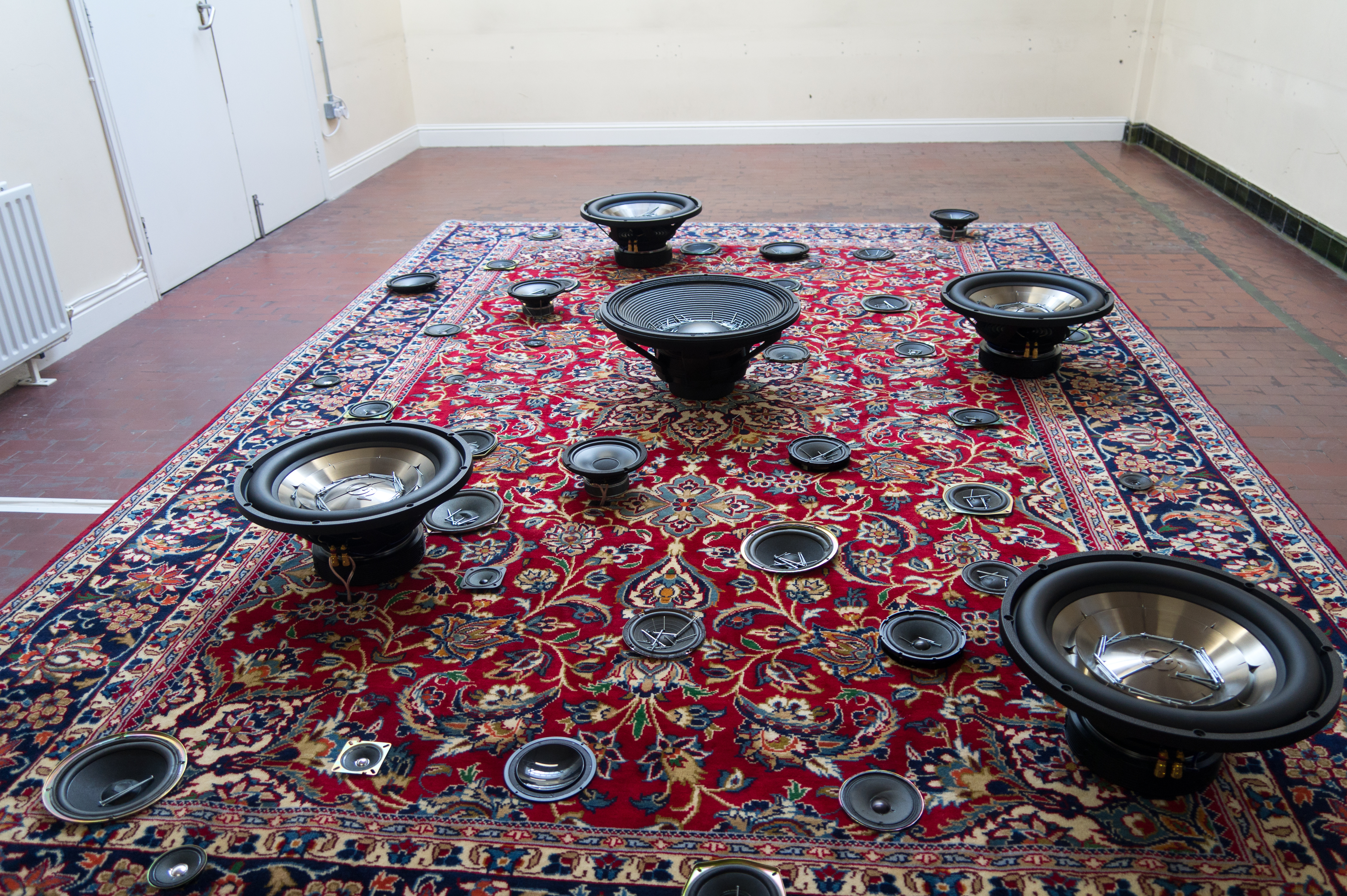
mounir fatmi

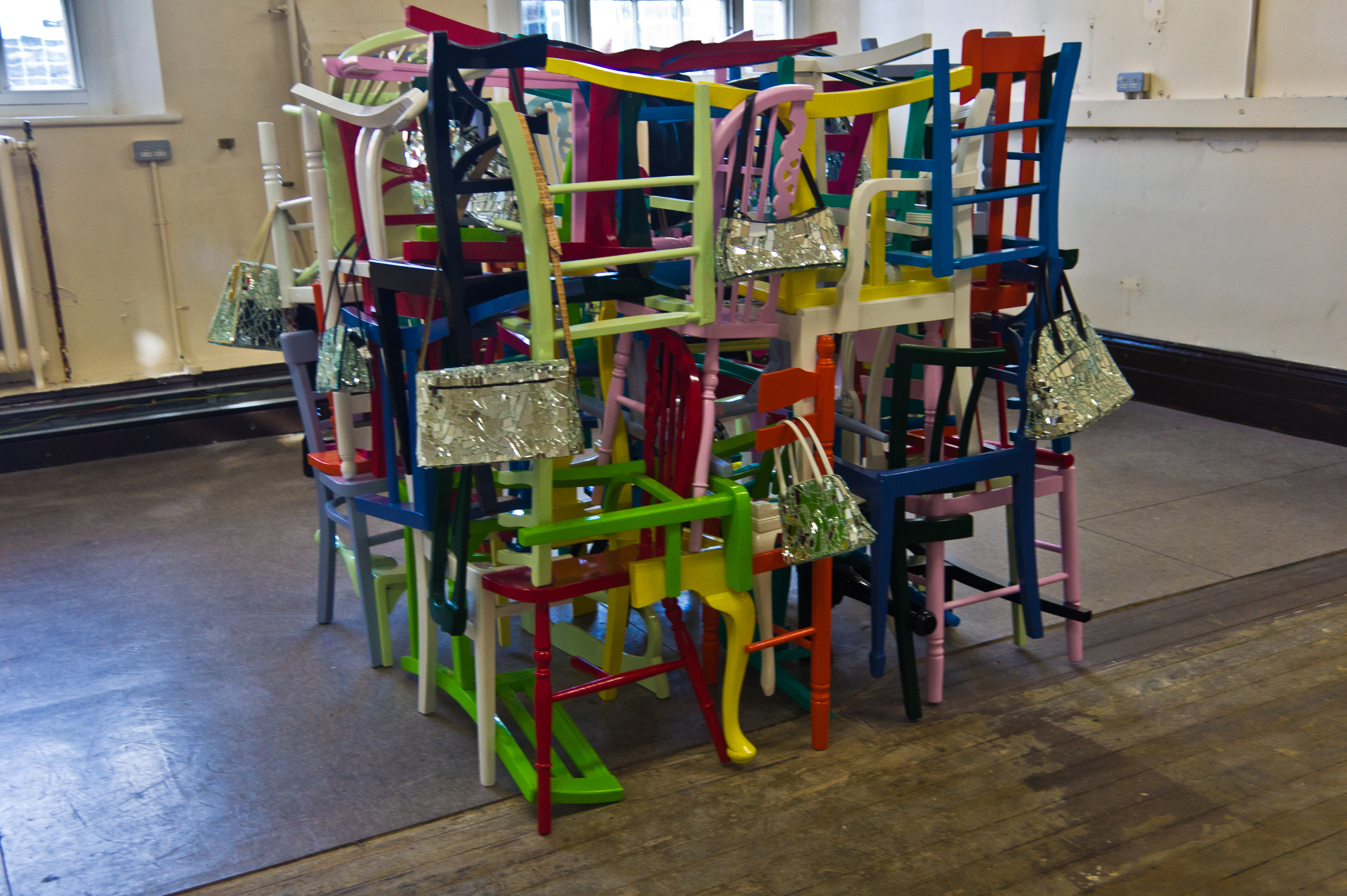
Jim Lambie

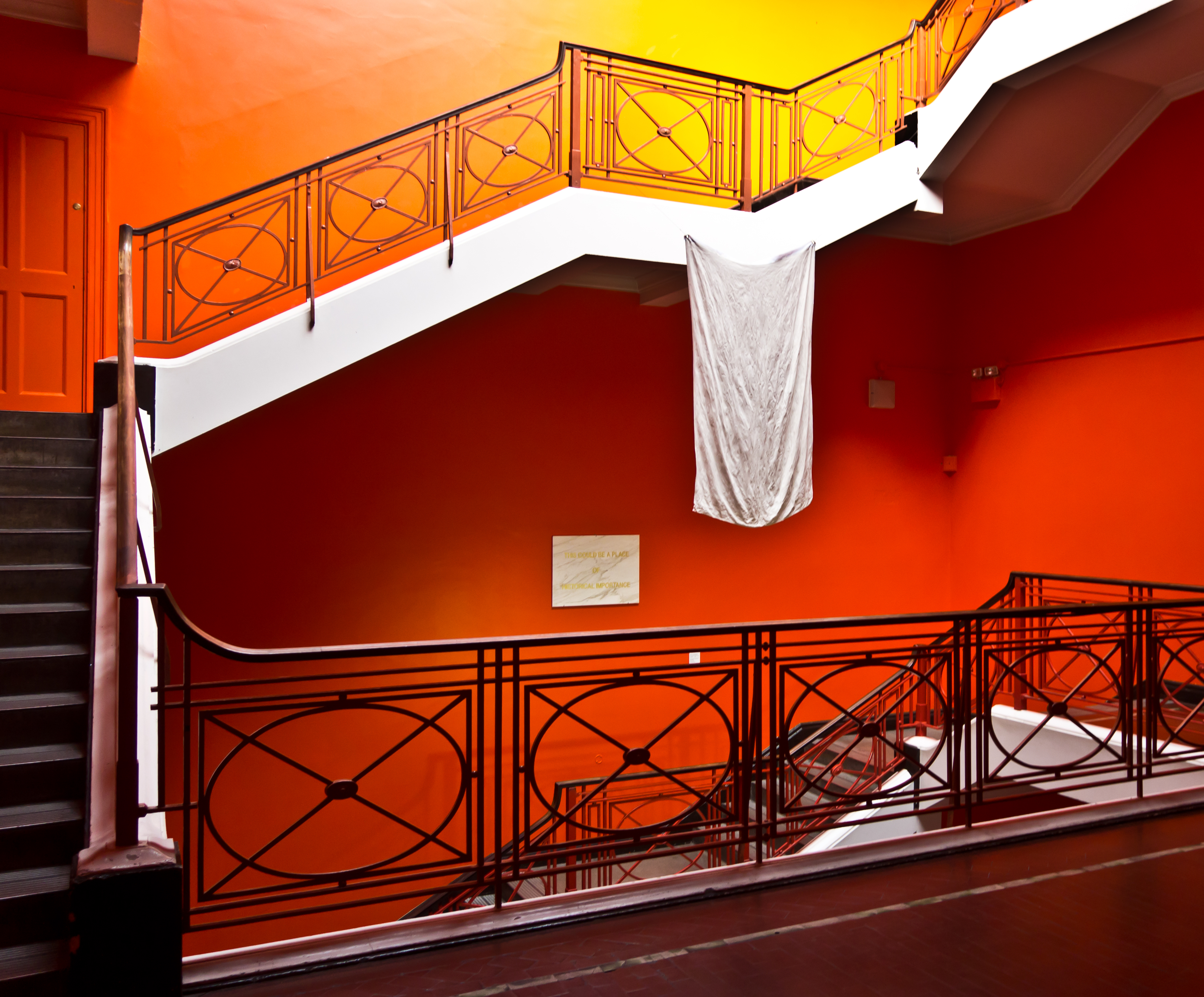
White flag/Surrender by Ella de Búrca

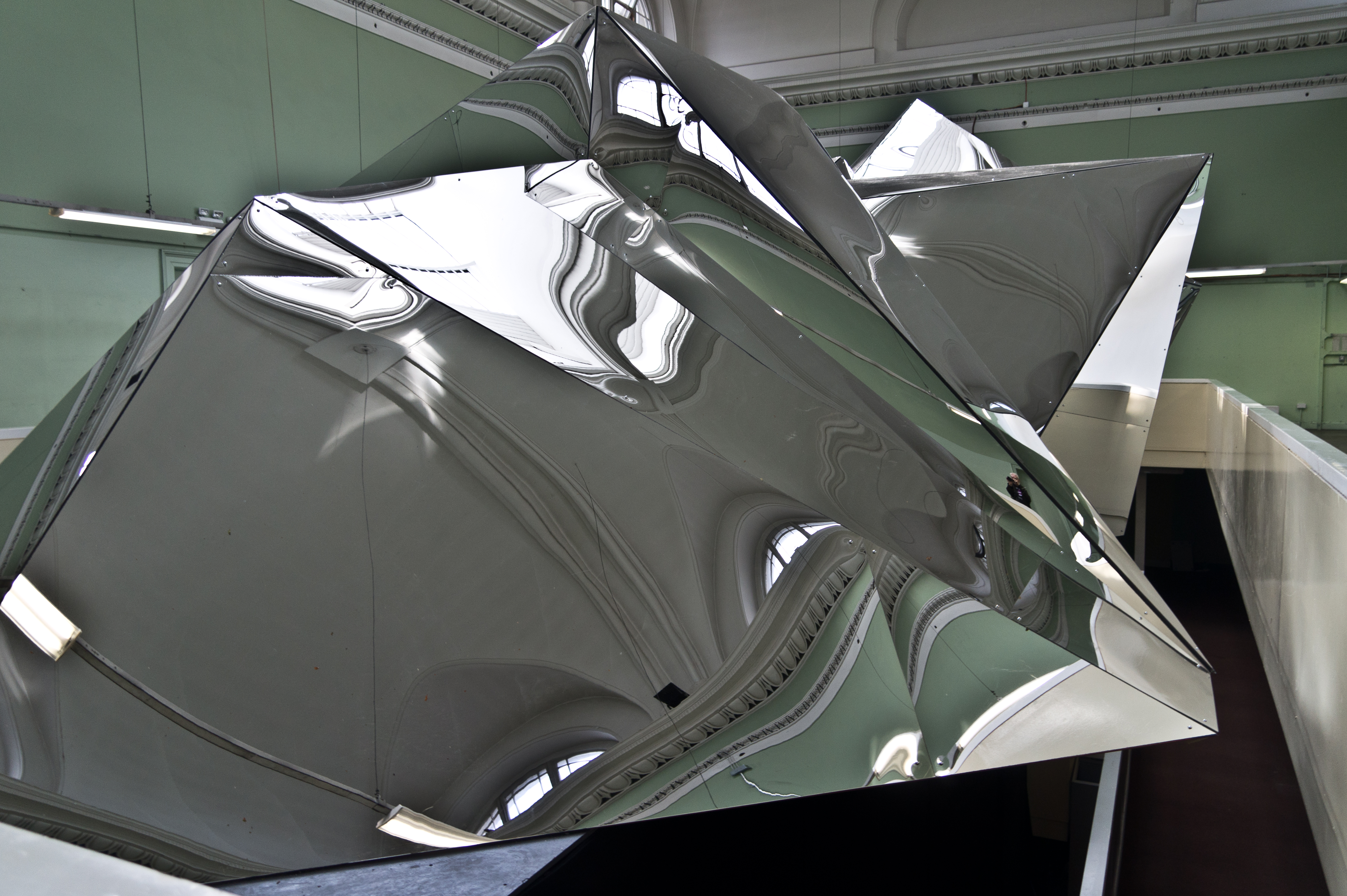
Us, by Jota Castro, with Gordon Ryan and Noji architects.

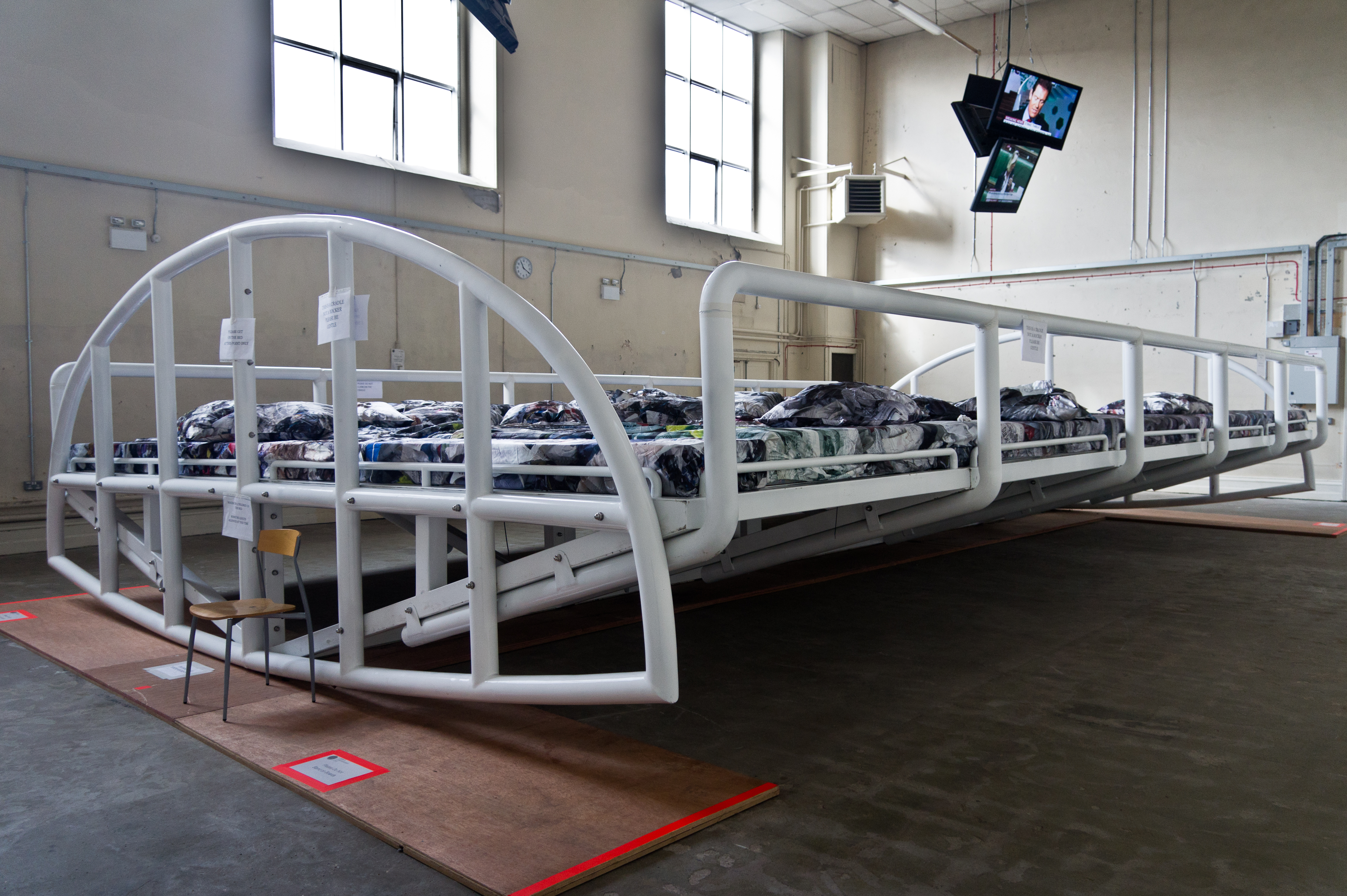
The Cradle, Wang Du

== Background ==
Dublin Contemporary was originally planned for 2010 and was "conceived as a documenta-style quintennial", and "a visual art exhibition on a scale never seen in Ireland before". It has been compared to the large Irish survey Rosc exhibitions from the 60's-80's – in fact, Rosc '80 also took place in Earlsfort Terrace.

Rachel Thomas was the Chair of long term planning and Senior Curator at IMMA. Thomas approached independent contemporary visual art curator Oliver Dowling in 2005 with the idea of an international-scale exhibition in Dublin.

The charitable organization 'St Patrick’s Festival' was tasked with the delivery of the exhibition. More than 5 years in the planning under Thomas's artistic direction, she put together a prestigious curatorial team consisting of Hans-Ulrich Obrist, Okwui Enwezor, Christine Macel, and Gerard Byrne and developed the exhibition theme of: Silence. Dublin Contemporary held 4 launches in London, New York, and twice in Dublin, but without announcing participating artists. Aidan Dunne writes:

"Just how many times, one arts administrator asked recently, can you launch an exhibition without putting any flesh on the bones? The reference was to the fact that while it’s being billed as a huge international event – on the scale of such established exhibitions as Documenta in Germany – virtually nothing concrete has emerged about its substance. Given the vague, outline nature of the enterprise, it’s probably not surprising that the multiple launches haven’t generated much of a buzz. Some of those present at the London launch during Frieze Art Fair, for example, observed – and were concerned — that the turnout was distinctly disappointing."

In January 2011, Thomas departed from the project suddenly. This was only 8 months before its planned launch. Many felt it was in fact so sudden, that the event must be postponed. There is no clear data as to why there was an abrupt change in artistic direction after so many years of planning. Although it is suspected that it was an acrimonious exit. A month later, Jota Castro and Christian Viveros-Fauné were named as Lead Curators.

The Irish Times reported that the Department of Tourism, Culture and Sport had committed €4.5 million in 2010. Others reported €4 million with half paid through state bodies and the remainder from ticket sales. Later estimates say it was closer to around €2.5 million, pointing to the fact that there were 4 international launches, previous commitments to commissions, and several years of planning and organisational costs eating away at the original figures.

The background of the exhibition created very difficult circumstances for the goals to be fulfilled and this seemingly negatively influenced critical reception. "The challenge of curating Dublin Contemporary 2011 was never going to be an easy one. With a substantial chunk of the original two and a half million budget spent on three pre-launches, and a further 70K promised to a small number of commissions agreed by the previous curatorial team, Castro and Viveros-Fauné were left with a very modest budget and no main venue in place..."

== Exhibition ==
The official blurb described Dublin Contemporary in its final form as "one of the most ambitious exhibitions ever staged in Ireland. Showcasing the work of more than 114 Irish and international artists, Dublin Contemporary 2011 set out to transform the city into a vibrant gallery."

=== Curators ===
Jota Castro is a Brussels-based Franco-Peruvian artist, curator, a former diplomat with the United Nations and the European Union, consulting editor Janus Magazine (Belgium) and Nolens Volens (Spain) and teacher at the European University (Madrid). Castro spent "over three months throughout Ireland visiting 500 studios, resulting in a refreshingly diverse group of lesser-known Irish artists."

Christian Viveros-Fauné is a New York-based writer and curator, an ex-art dealer and an ex-art fair director. As a writer he has been published in Art in America, artnet, Artnews, Art Papers, Art Review, The Art Newspaper, Frieze, La Tercera (Chile), La Vanguardia (Spain), The New Yorker, and The New York Press (for which he was the weekly art critic between 1998 and 2003).

=== Theme ===
"As curators of the first Dublin Contemporary exhibition, we resolved early on to directly engage the multiple challenges of organising an exhibition of this scale in Ireland today. Embracing "the elephant in the room" resolutely led us to our tripartite theme: "Terrible Beauty: Art, Crisis, Change & the Office of Non-Compliance". Recalling W.B. Yeats' famous phrase at a new global historical watershed underscored for us art's most important contemporary abdication-its inability to seriously engage society's problems during our own postmodern era."

Under Castro and Viveros-Fauné the title and theme of Dublin Contemporary was taken from William Butler Yeats’ famous poem “Easter, 1916”. The second part of the exhibition's title, The Office of Non-Compliance, was a collaborative agency within Dublin Contemporary, establishing creative solutions for real or symbolic problems that stretch the bounds of conventional art experience.

=== Venues and programme ===
The main exhibition hub at Earlsfort Terrace, former home of University College Dublin, provided a range of unusual spaces for 70+ mini solo exhibitions that range from large-scale installations to smaller intimate hangings; placing well-known international artists side-by-side emerging Irish ones. The Office of Non-Compliance, located within the Earlsfort Terrace exhibition site, functioned as a promoter of ideas around a laundry list of non-conformist art proposals. This element of the exhibition included ad hoc, accessible structures for discourse around art and its place in society.

Extending its reach across the city, Dublin Contemporary was partner of four important Dublin galleries: The Douglas Hyde Gallery, Dublin City Gallery The Hugh Lane, The National Gallery of Ireland, and The Royal Hibernian Academy.

Dublin City Gallery The Hugh Lane presented new work by Irish artist Willie Doherty. An exhibition of American painter Alice Neel's portraits took place at The Douglas Hyde Gallery. The National Gallery of Ireland hosted works by a number of international artists, as well as a new commission by Irish artist Brian O'Doherty. The Royal Hibernian Academy hosted an exhibition of works by American painter Lisa Yuskavage and a new commission by Irish artist James Coleman.

=== Artists ===
The exhibition included:

Alexandre Arrechea, Kader Attia, Nina Berman, Jorge Méndez Blake, Monica Bonvicini, The Bruce High Quality Foundation, Fernando Bryce, Ella Burke (Ella de Búrca), Matt Calderwood, Cleary & Connolly (Anne Cleary and Denis Connolly), James Coleman, Amanda Coogan, Willie Doherty, Wang Du, Maarten Vanden Eynde, Omer Fast, mounir fatmi, Hans Peter Feldmann, Kendell Geers, David Godbold, Conor Harrington, Thomas Hirschhorn, Katie Holten, Jaki Irvine, Kysa Johnson, Patrick Jolley, Jim Lambie, Brian Maguire, Richard Mosse, Alice Neel, Manuel Ocampo, Brian O'Doherty, Niamh O'Malley, Dan Perjovschi, William Powhida, Wilfredo Prieto, Guy Richards Smit, Marinella Senatore, Will St Leger, Superflex, Javier Téllez, Vedovamazzei, Corban Walker, Patrick Hamilton and Lisa Yuskavage.

=== Dublin Contemptibles (DC2) and the "Million Dollar Potato" ===
DC2 was a counter-cultural, independent "fringe" arts initiative organised by "d-ploy Dublin" a creative agency run by Emmanuelle Marion and James Doyle. Under the banner "DC2: Gentrify THIS!", it operated as a free indoor and outdoor independent festival showcasing over 30 Dublin-based artists. d-ploy Dublin focused heavily on community, grassroots resistance, and reclaiming creative spaces amidst a rapidly changing urban landscape. Amongst the featured artists was Doyle's own work: a critique of ""The Machiavellian triumvirate of developers, economists and bankers" which was purchased by Jota Castro, and a photo of an Irish potato by the photographer Kevin Abosch, which subsequently sold for 1 million euros.

=== Criticism ===
The exhibition was widely derided in Ireland, due to a number of factors including mismanagement of funds, curatorial disarray, the location, and Castro's inclusion of his own work in a key site within the exhibition venue. Although the multi-story mirrored piece, titled Us, was in fact made in collaboration with Gordon Ryan and Noji architects.

Art critic Declan Long wrote that "an expression of sorrow may well be one appropriate response to the recent phenomenon of Dublin Contemporary..." He is highly critical of the curator Jota Castro's curation of his own work in a central location in the show. Long went on to praise "Niamh O’Malley’s contemplative black and white film Quarry...: a curiously compelling, slow-moving study of a crumbling limestone landscape".

Despite the generally negative reception, a number of works received individually positive feedback. For example Alejandro Almanza Pereda's Horror Vacuii, and Javier Téllez's One Flew Over the Void, as well as works by Ella Burke (Ella de Búrca), William Powhida, Maarten Vanden Eynde, and Matt Calderwood.

== Aftermath ==
The event was expected to draw over 150,000 visitors and then Minister for Arts, Heritage, and the Gaeltacht, Jimmy Deenihan TD believed "Dublin Contemporary 2011 will provide a highlight for cultural tourism in Ireland on a global scale." Although official final attendance numbers are not available, the now defunct website claimed to have drawn well over that number shortly after the exhibition's closing.

Dublin Contemporary was planned to be an exhibition that would take place every five years, it did not take place in 2016, nor has there been any further announcements about its future. Although not technically a biennale, it was effectively the Irish answer to 'biennialisation'. More than 114 Irish and international artists participated through new commissions and numerous small exhibitions held in Earlsfort Terrace.
