= Christian Viveros-Fauné =

American art critic and curator

Christian Viveros-Fauné is a New York-based writer and curator of contemporary art.

== Career ==
Viveros-Fauné is a former art dealer, and former art fair director. He has lectured at Yale University, Pratt Institute, and Parsons School of Design, as well as being a Visiting Critic at the Rhode Island School of Design and Holland's Rietveld Academie. A collection of his criticism, Greatest Hits: Arte en Nueva York 2001–2011, was published in 2012, and Social Forms: A Short History of Political Art was published by David Zwirner Books in 2018. Also, in 2018, it was announced by the University of South Florida Contemporary Art Museum that Viveros-Fauné will be the 'curator-at-large'. Simultaneously, he will be the Kennedy Family Visiting Scholar at the USF School of Art and Art History during 2018–19.

=== Writing ===
As a writer, Viveros-Fauné has published in Art in America, Art in Australia, artnet, Artnews, ArtNexus, Art Papers, Art Review (UK), Atlántica (Spain), The Baffler, Departures Magazine, El Mercurio (Chile), Frieze (UK), LÁPIZ (Spain), La Tercera (Chile), Newsweek, The New Yorker, The New York Press, and The Village Voice.

Viveros-Fauné was awarded the 2010 Creative Capital/Warhol Foundation Arts Writers Grant, named inaugural Critic-in-Residence at the Bronx Museum for 2010/2011, and served on the 2012 committee to select Chile's representative to the 55th Venice Biennale.

=== Curation ===
Between 2001 and 2018, Viveros-Fauné organized exhibitions at the Art Museum of the Americas (Washington, DC), the Bronx Museum of the Arts, the Centro Atlántico de Arte Moderno (Las Palmas, Spain), CorpArtes (Santiago, Chile), the Douglas Hyde Gallery (Dublin, Ireland) the Amparo Museum (Puebla, Mexico), the Santiago Museum of Contemporary Art (Santiago, Chile), the Museo de Arte Contemporáneo de Lima (Lima, Peru), the Museo de Arte Contemporaneo de Monterrey (Monterrey, Mexico), the Museo de Arte Moderno (Mexico City, Mexico), the Chilean National Museum of Fine Arts (Santiago, Chile), and the National Gallery of Ireland.

Viveros-Fauné was Lead Curator of Dublin Contemporary with Jota Castro in 2011.

He has worked with Thomas Hirschhorn, Yishai Jusidman, Jannis Kounellis, Teresa Margolles, Richard Mosse, Angel Otero, Tavares Strachan, Superflex, Jorge Tacla, and Lisa Yuskavage.

== Bibliography ==
- Faune, Christian. Social forms : a short history of political art. New York, New York: David Zwirner Books, 2018. ISBN 9789568415495
- Boulos, Mark, and Matthew Schum. Mark Boulos. Berlin: Hatje Cantz Verlag, 2017. ISBN 9780984408160
- Faune, Christian. Lissie Habie : a life in pictures. Milan New York, NY: Charta Artbook, 2014. ISBN 9781894699082
- Alsoudani, Ahmed. Ahmed Alsoudani : redacted. Phoenix Portland: Phoenix Art Museum Portland Museum of Art, 2013. ISBN 9781938922480
- Faune, Christian. Greatest hits : arte en Nueva York, 2001-2011. Santiago de Chile: Ediciones Metales Pesados, 2012. ISBN 9783775742696
- Kramer, David, Christian Fauné, and Joan Stebbins. Heaven on earth : Southern Alberta Art Gallery, Mar. 3-Apr. 29, 2001, Owens Art Gallery, Oct. 19-Dec. 9, 2001. Lethbridge, Alta. Sackville, N.B. Montréal, Québec: Southern Alberta Art Gallery Owens Art Gallery Official distribution by ABC Art Books Canada, 2001. ISBN 9789568415495
