= Eimear Walshe =

Irish contemporary artist and writer

Eimear Walshe is an Irish contemporary artist and writer whose work explores land, housing, sexuality, and inheritance in Ireland. They were the representative artist for Ireland at the 2024 Venice Biennale.

== Career ==
Walshe works across video, performance, and writing, often engaging with Irish history and contemporary politics of land and sexuality. Much of their work is informed by their queer identity and explores questions of intimacy, kinship, and marginalised sexualities in relation to Irish society.

Their 2020 film The Land Question was produced for EVA International and has been described as a significant work within their practice, combining archival material with contemporary narratives to examine land ownership, inheritance, and sexuality in Ireland. The work has also been discussed in academic contexts: John Roberts (philosopher) noted how The Land Question unravels colonial narratives of enclosure and confinement in Ireland.

Walshe's work has been exhibited at venues including Project Arts Centre and Temple Bar Gallery and Studios in Dublin, and internationally in group shows. In 2024 they represented Ireland at the Venice Biennale with a major commission presented in the Irish Pavilion.

== Writing ==
In addition to their artistic practice, Walshe contributes essays and critical writing on art, sexuality, and culture, published in outlets such as Art Monthly and Paper Visual Art Journal.

== Activism ==
Walshe's artistic and political practice often overlap. In 2024 they were arrested during a protest against the use of Shannon Airport by the US military. EVA International, a major Irish arts institution, issued a formal solidarity statement in support of Walshe, noting that this occurred during ongoing court proceedings.

Later in the same year, Walshe joined other Irish artists in calling for cultural institutions to take a stance on the war in Gaza, signing open letters and speaking at public events.
