= Niamh O'Malley =

Visual artist

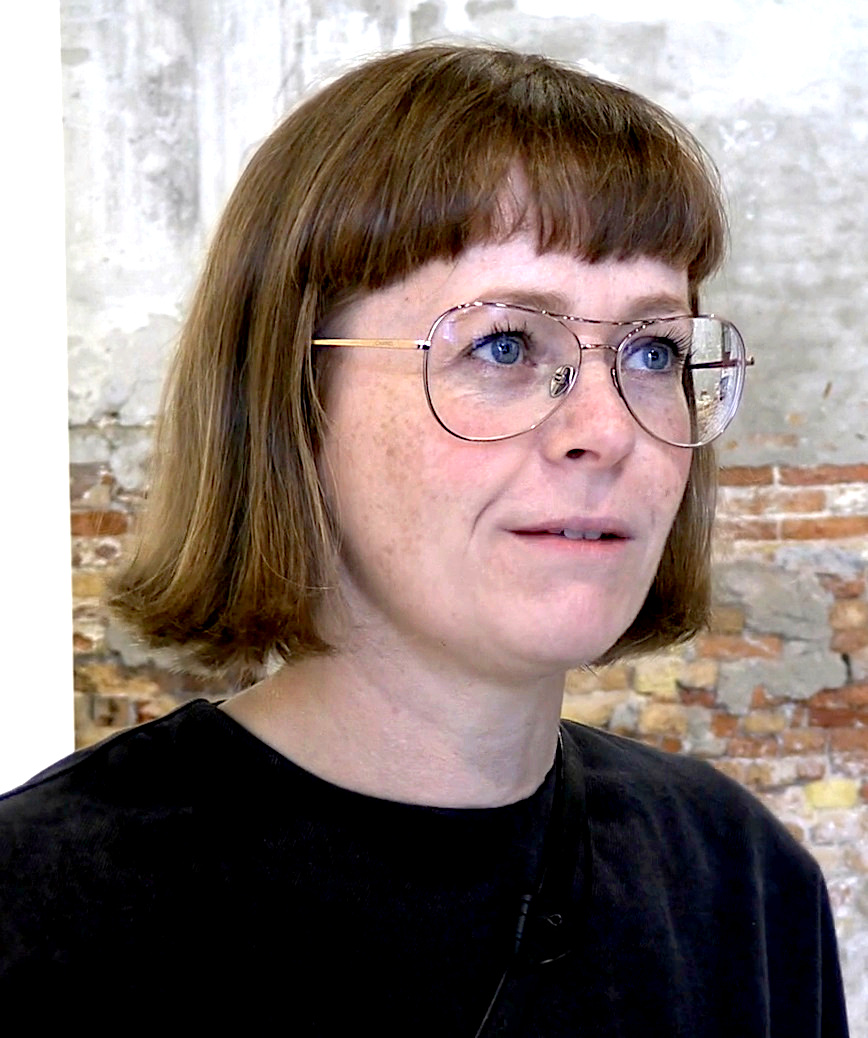
- O’Malley in 2022
- Born: County Mayo, Ireland
- Education: University of Ulster
- Elected: Aosdána
- Website: http://www.niamhomalley.com/

Niamh O'Malley is a contemporary Irish artist known for sculptures and moving image installations. She was elected to membership in Ireland's artistic academy, Aosdána, and represented the country at the 59th Venice Biennale.

== Early life and education ==
Born in County Mayo, Ireland, O’Malley studied at University of Ulster, Belfast, earning her PhD in 2003. She lives and works in Dublin.

== Work ==
O'Malley has created a number of installations in Ireland and the UK over the last decade. Writer Jack Welsh describes her solo show at The Bluecoat, Liverpool: "Encompassing video, painting, sculpture, drawing and printmaking, the exhibition explores O’Malley’s interest in constructing images, primarily using the material and spatial properties of glass." Irish Times critic Aidan Dunne discusses her use of glass at the Royal Hibernian Academy: "O’Malley is very taken with glass as a material in her work. If transparent, it offers a view on to a scene and often it frames the view. It can also fragment the view or obscure it."

== Career ==
O'Malley's participation in the 2011 Dublin Contemporary, a film titled Quarry, was regarded as a stand out "moving piece" in the large exhibition. This is Tomorrow magazine wrote: "Many of the other successful works were contributions from Irish artists. Niamh O’Malley’s film ‘Quarry’ (2011) sumptuously captures the barren landscape of a stone quarry."

Her 2015 installation at The Douglas Hyde, which included a number of freestanding glass and metal sculptural frames, as well as video, was well received critically. Rory Prout of Enclave Review takes note that "the prevailing concern is the artist’s larger, ongoing phenomenological project... they are methods which continue to offer subtle inflections of the viewer’s observation of otherwise highly familiar environments."

O'Malley, curated by Temple Bar Gallery + Studios, represented Ireland at the 59th Venice Biennale, with a delayed opening in April 2022. Shown in an old building in The Arsenale, O'Malley worked with a local team and stated “I’ve made some very heavy pieces, in Kilkenny limestone with big steel bases. All of it has had transported by boat, and hoisted into position.”

On the basis of her body of work, O'Malley was elected to Aosdána. Her work is in a number of collections, including The Hugh Lane, Irish Museum of Modern Art, and the Arts Council of Ireland.

=== Selected solo shows ===
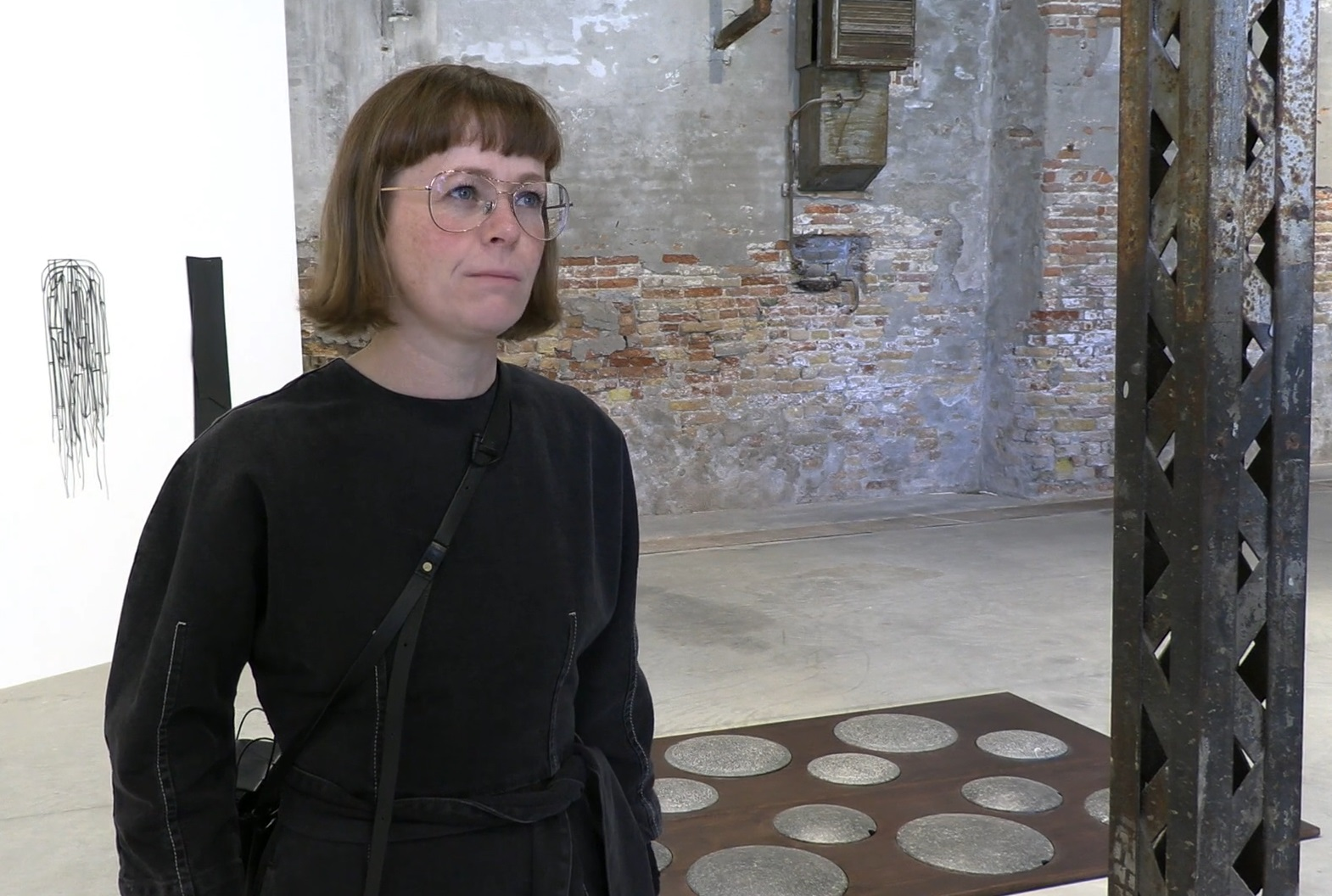
Niamh O’Malley at Irish Pavilion installation 2022

- 2009 - No Distance, Void, Derry, Northern Ireland
- 2010 - Echo, Gaain Gallery, Seoul, Korea
- 2010 - Frame, Glass, Black, Centre Culturel Irlandais, Paris, France
- 2011 - Model, Green on Red Gallery, Dublin, Ireland
- 2013 - Garden, Project Arts Centre, Dublin
- 2015 - Douglas Hyde Gallery, Dublin
- 2015 - Bluecoat Liverpool
- 2018 - Foiled Glass, Grazer Kunstverein
- 2019 - Lismore Castle Arts
- 2019 - Handle, Royal Hibernian Academy
- 2020 - Placeholder, Mother's Tankstation
- 2022 - Irish Pavilion installation, Arsenale, Venice.

== Bibliography ==
- Niamh O’Malley, texts by Claire-Louise Bennett, Isobel Harbison, Dublin: Royal Hibernian Academy, 2019.
- Malley, Niamh, and Brian Dillon. Torch. Dublin: Temple Bar Gallery and Studios, 2008. ISBN 978-8883413469
- Malley, Niamh. Niamh O'Malley : window. Siena: Papesse Centro Arte Contemporanea, 2007. ISBN 978-1903895993
