= Pádraig Timoney =

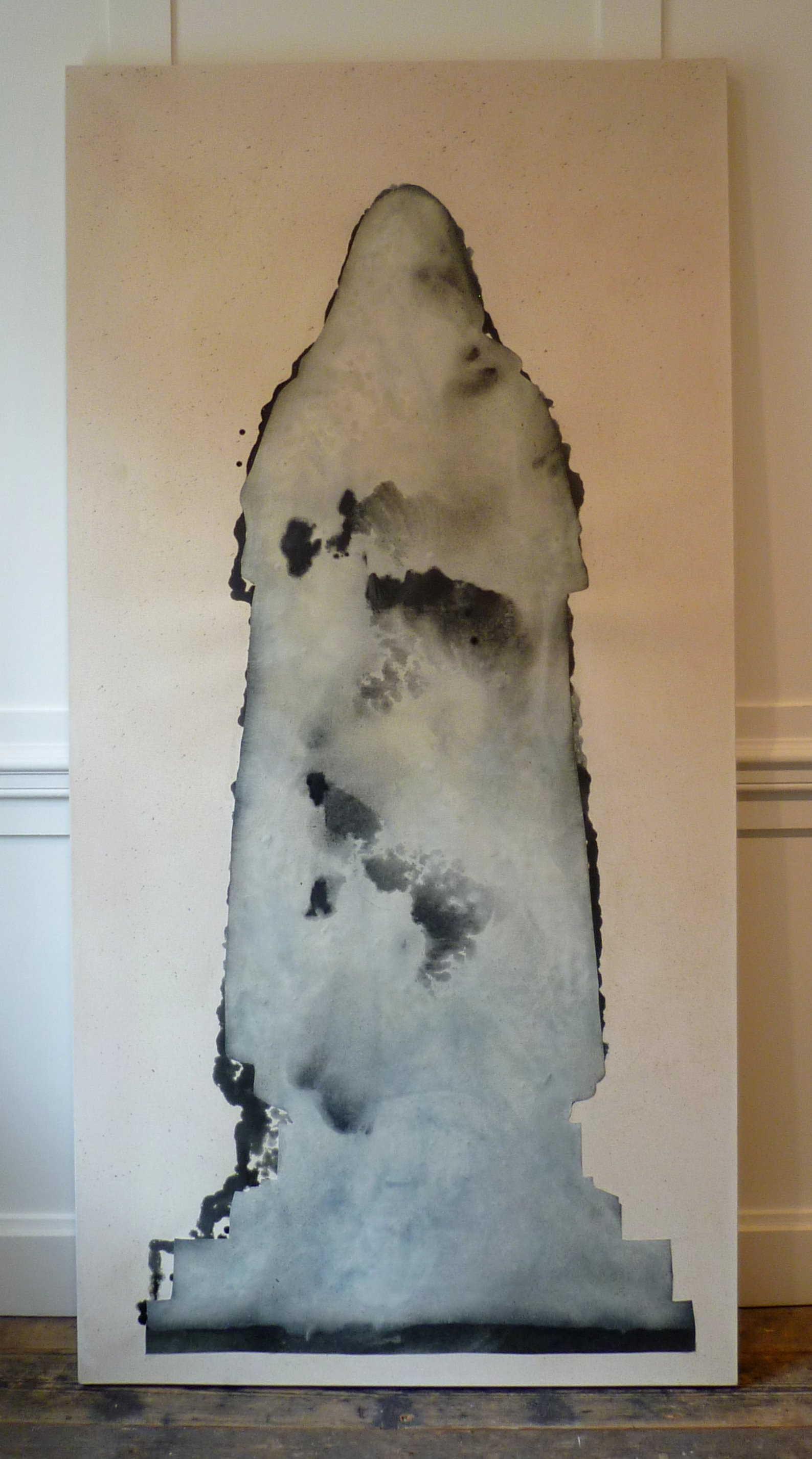
Untitled, 2010, by Padraig Timoney including "dragon's blood".

Pádraig Timoney (born 1968 in Derry, Northern Ireland) is an artist who has become noted for the extreme diversity of his work so that his solo exhibitions sometimes appear to be group exhibitions by different artists. A past-pupil of St Columb's College, Derry, Timoney graduated from Goldsmiths College, University of London, in 1991 and in 1999 was one of the curators for the Liverpool Biennial. Timoney works principally using photography, painting and installation.

== Selected publications ==
- Beled Answer, Decathlon Books, New York, 2011. ISBN 9780955492389

== Selected works ==
- Untitled, 2010, with "Dragon's blood".
- Consider the Lillies of the Field, 2009.
- Che Meraviglia, 1997.

== Selected solo exhibitions ==
- 2013, 'Fontwell Helix Feely', Raven Row, London.
- 2012, 'Stanligrad in every city', Raucci/Santamaria, Naples.
- 2012, 'Shepard Tone', The Modern Institute, Osborne Street, Glasgow.
- 2010, 'Instead of Being Lucky', Andrew Kreps Gallery, New York.

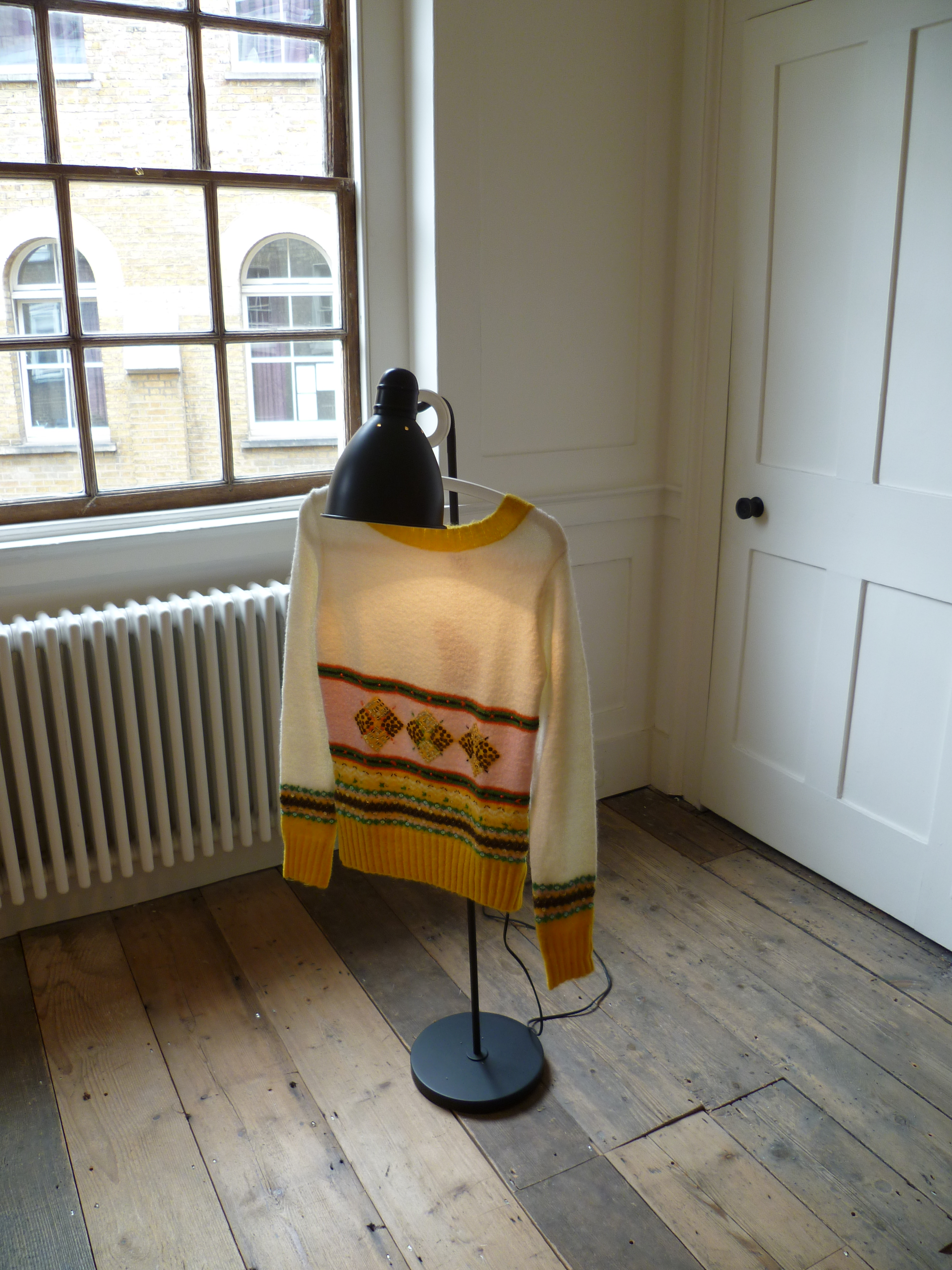
Consider the Lillies of the Field, 2009.

- 2010, 'Buenas Noches, Laser', Xavier Hufkens, Brussels.
- 2009, 'Folklores', Raucci/Santamaria, Naples.
- 2008, 'Rockeryeer', The Modern Institute/Toby Webster Ltd, Glasgow.
- 2008, 'Fave New Bridges Knot Knowing Corona Cardinals', Galerie Almine Rech, Paris.
- 2007, Xavier Hufkens, Brussels.
- 2007, 'Golarithm', Andrew Kreps Gallery, New York.
- 2006, 'Museum Metropolitan', Galleria Raucci/Santamaria, Naples.
- 2006, 'The Fear of All Sums - Ten Million Dice To Weigh', Void, Derry (Curated by C. Darke).
- 2005, 'One year speaks clear some years' peaks clear', Raucci/Santamaria, Naples.
- 2003, 'The Modern Institute/Toby Webster Ltd, Glasgow.

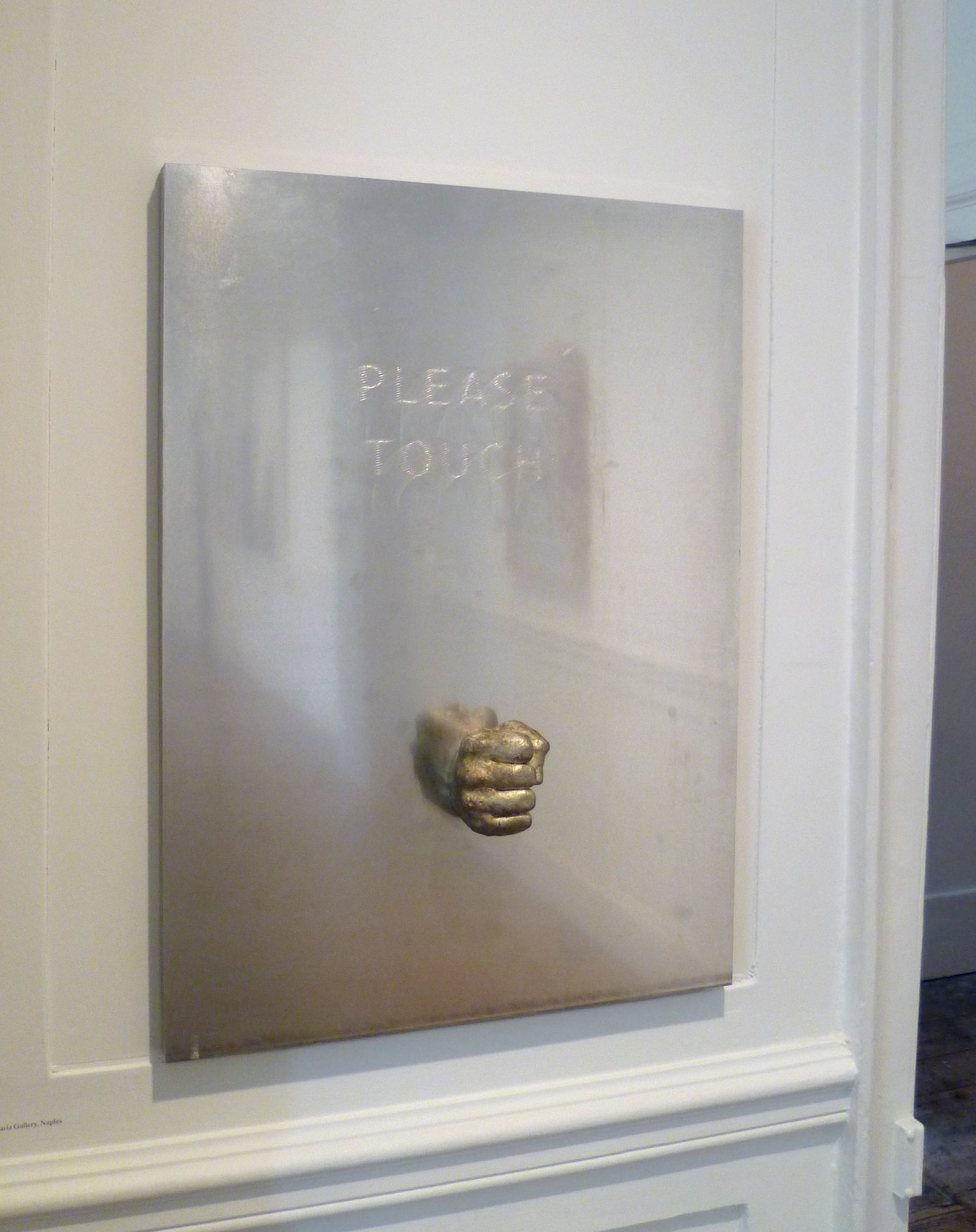
Please Touch, 2007. Edition of five.

- 2003, Castlefield Gallery, Manchester.
- 2003, 'Statement Art Basel', Art Basel, Basel (With Raucci/Santamaria Gallery).
- 2003, 'The Grapevine in the Limelight', 38 Langham Street, London.
- 2002, 'Lazy Clever Doubt', Douglas Hyde Gallery, Dublin.
- 2002, 'Millions of Dead Tamagotchi', Bluecoat Gallery, Liverpool.
- 2002, 'Present Future', Raucci/Santamaria Gallery, Turin (Artissima).
- 2000, 'The Suburban', Oak Park, Chicago.
- 1997, Raucci/Santamaria, Naples.
- 1997, 'No Tim Page Diary', Galerie Analix, Geneva.
- 1997, 'The Hunter Became … The Hunted', Laure Genillard, London.
- 1996, 'Works Away', Orchard Gallery, Derry.
- 1995, Cyprus Photographic Society, Nicosia, Cyprus.
- 1994, Raucci/Santamaria, Naples.
- 1993, 'September', Laure Genillard, London.
- 1992, Goldsmiths Gallery, London.
- 1992, Milch, London.
