= Aesthetician =

Aesthetician may refer to:

- A specialist in philosophical aesthetics
  - List of aestheticians
- Aesthetician, a cosmetologist who specializes in the study of skin care
