= Josh Tonsfeldt =

- Born: 1979 (age 46–47); Independence, Missouri, U.S.
- Education: SUNY Purchase College, Columbia University
- Known for: Photography, sculpture, educator
- Movement: Post-conceptual art

Josh Tonsfeldt (born 1979) is an American artist and educator.

== Early life and education ==
Tonsfeldt was born in 1979 in Independence, Missouri, and was raised in Kansas City. He graduated from SUNY Purchase College in 2004 with a BA in New Media. He received an MFA from Columbia University in 2007.

== Work ==
Tonsfeldt works across a variety of media–including moving image, photography, sculpture and drawing–with an approach that is site-responsive and open-ended. He combines found elements with materials from his personal archives and life to imbue a frame onto otherwise common or untraceable images. In an untitled work from 2015 shown at Bright Golden Haze, a group exhibition at Oklahoma Contemporary, Tonsfeldt combines sculpture and video in a dissected LCD television that exposes its internal wiring and LED lights. On the work, critic Thomas Duncan wrote of Tonsfeldt’s work, “the viewer's attention is thrust from the video to the very mechanisms that enable its legibility, to the familiarity of the objects and back again … the effect, almost respiratory, is utterly hypnotic.”

Josh Tonsfeldt’s work has been reviewed in Flash Art and Artforum.

== Exhibitions ==
Tonsfeldt has exhibited in the United States and abroad. His work has been shown in solo exhibitions at Broadway Gallery, New York (2024); Douglas Hyde Gallery, Dublin (2023); Simon Preston Gallery, New York (2015); VidalCuglietta, Brussels (2013); and Franco Soffiantino Gallery, Turin (2010).

Tonsfeldt’s work has been featured in numerous group exhibitions, including 100 Sculptures, Anonymous Gallery, New York (2021); Bright Golden Haze, Oklahoma Contemporary, Oklahoma City (2020); It's Necessary to Talk About Trees, Foreland, Catskill (2019); Digital Artifacts, Thoma Foundation, Santa Fe (2018); Artists’ Choice: An Expanded Field of Photography, Mass MoCA, North Adams (2015); Mississippi, GAMeC / Bergamo (2014); and Temple Bar Gallery & Studios Are Dead, Temple Bar Gallery, Dublin (2013); among others.

Tonsfeldt’s work is in the collections of the Metropolitan Museum of Art, the Thoma Foundation, the Parrish Museum, and the Pérez Museum in Miami.

== Teaching ==
Tonsfeldt has taught at Columbia University and SUNY Purchase College. In 2020, he was chosen as the Teiger Mentor in the Arts at Cornell University.
