= Douglas Hyde Gallery =

The Douglas Hyde Gallery
- Irish: Gailearaí Dhubhghlas de hÍde
- Installation photograph of 'Fotografias' by Fischli/Weiss in Gallery 1, The Douglas Hyde Gallery, March 2009

- Location within Central Dublin
- Established: 1978
- Location: Nassau Street, Trinity College Dublin, Ireland
- Coordinates: 53°20′36″N 6°15′28″W
- Type: Contemporary art gallery
- Director: Georgina Jackson
- Website: Official website

The Douglas Hyde Gallery is a publicly funded contemporary art gallery located in Trinity College Dublin, Ireland. It is named for Douglas Hyde, a graduate of Trinity College and the first president of Ireland.

The Gallery was co-founded by the Arts Council and Trinity College Dublin. It opened to the public in March 1978 as the first publicly-funded gallery dedicated to contemporary art and the first university gallery in Ireland. When the Gallery opened in 1978, it was for a number of years Ireland's only public gallery of contemporary art. In 2017 Georgina Jackson was appointed director, taking over from John Hutchinson who was director for 25 years.

The Douglas Hyde Gallery consists of two exhibition spaces that are used to show concurrent exhibitions, which often have a relating theme or tone.

== Galleries ==
=== Gallery 1 ===
Gallery 1, designed by Paul Koralek of ABK Architects, is the Gallery's main space and has played host to solo-exhibitions by renowned artists such as Fischli/Weiss, Marlene Dumas, Gabriel Orozco, Mona Hatoum and Peter Doig. Notable Irish artists who have exhibited in Gallery 1 include: Dorothy Cross, Willie Doherty, Gerard Byrne, Patrick Graham, Patrick Hall, Michael Warren, Kathy Prendergast, Aleana Egan, Sam Keogh, Niamh O'Malley, Isabel Nolan, and Sean Lynch.

=== Gallery 2 ===
Installation photograph of 'The Paradise [4]' by Marlene Dumas in Gallery 2, The Douglas Hyde Gallery, December 2001

Gallery 2, which opened in 2001, was designed by McCullough Mulvin Architects. In addition to exhibitions by contemporary artists, this space was often used by director John Hutchinson to show small collections of ethnographic objects and artefacts, or outsider art, which are generally marginalised by larger museums and galleries. The most popular of these exhibitions have included: Nepalese Shamanic objects, Japanese Tea Bowls and Ghanaian Asafo Fante Flags.

A number of exhibitions in Gallery 2 fell under "The Paradise" series of shows, which invited artists to create a new work or present a series of works based on their own idea of "The Paradise". The series included 40 exhibits, the last of which was created by artist Ciarán Murphy in 2013.

== Publications ==
The Douglas Hyde Gallery produces publications for many of its exhibitions. These books can take the form of exhibition catalogues, artists’ books or curated projects and, while extremely different in content, they all share a similar exterior presentation. The Gallery has published many books in this small, hardback format.

The Leaves & Papers series of books and leaflets was a project which allowed The Douglas Hyde Gallery to produce and publish ideas, images and texts relating to a specific theme or concept which does not always relate directly to the Gallery's programme. The first six of these were compiled into a book published by the Gallery in 2008.

Another series of books documents the Galley's programme while also highlighting some of the central principles of the Gallery and its exhibitions. The books explore ideas about visual culture, identity, and spirituality through carefully selected texts and imagery. These books include: the bread and butter stone, 1997; Patmos, 1999; 33 Happy Moments, 2003; Alabama Chrome, 2007; The Bridge, 2008; Questions of Travel, 2009; Saunter, 2010.

== Music ==
The Douglas Hyde Gallery has become increasingly well known for its programme of musical events. In recent years, Cat Power, Sufjan Stevens and Laura Veirs have all played in the Gallery. Sometimes the musical performances relate directly to exhibitions: In 2008, Jandek performed a concert to coincide with an exhibition of his album covers and in 2009, Jim White played a gig to celebrate the opening of his exhibition of ephemera from the American South. Often, the performances and exhibitions share a mood or atmosphere rather than a direct connection.

== See also ==
- Temple Bar Gallery and Studios
