= Andrei Molodkin =

Russian painter

- Born: 1966 (age 59–60); Buy, Kostroma Oblast
- Known for: Conceptual art, installation art
- Notable work: "Liquid Modernity", "Transformer no. M208", "Catholic Blood", "Le Rouge et le Noir", "Ceci n’est pas Carla"

Andrei Molodkin (Russian: Андрей Молодкин; born 1966) is a Russian born conceptual artist living and working in Paris, France.

== Biography ==
Molodkin was born in Buy, Kostroma Oblast, a small town in North-Western Russia. He served in the Soviet Army for two years from 1985 to 1987 transporting missiles across Siberia. He later graduated from the Architecture and Interior design department at the Stroganov Moscow State University of Arts and Industry in 1992.

== Work and career ==
Molodkin's practise comprises drawing, sculpture and installation. His drawings are made in ball-point pen, an implement that references his experiences in the Soviet Military "where soldiers would receive two Bics a day to write letters", they are often "laboriously drawn replicas of mass-media images". His sculptures and installations often employ materials techniques and practices common in engineering "Molodkin creates a complex mechanical system consisting of air compressors, cast-iron pumps, and plastic tubing" that pump liquids (most commonly blood and/or crude oil) around hollowed perspex replicas of sculptures and architecture, as well as politically loaded words and phrases. According to Douglas Rogers, author of 'The Depths of Russia: Oil, Power and Culture After Socialism', "His [Molodkin] work draws attention to the technical systems that channel political and economic configurations and to the ways in which words, concepts and spaces can be colored, inflected, shaped and filled by their associations with oil." In 2009, Molodkin was invited to participate in the Russian Pavilion of the 53rd Venice Biennale, the exhibition was named 'Victory Over The Future'. For the Pavilion Molodkin submitted his 2009 work 'Le Rouge et le Noir', a multimedia installation that featured a two hollow acrylic block replicas of the statue of Nike of Samothrace, a Hellenistic sculpture on permanent display at the Louvre depicting Nike, the Greek goddess of victory. The installation featured the blood of a Russian soldier and veteran of the Chechen War being mixed, using a system of pumps, with Chechen oil inside the cavities of the blocks. The piece was deemed too controversial leading to the pavilion's curator removing the description of the piece from display.

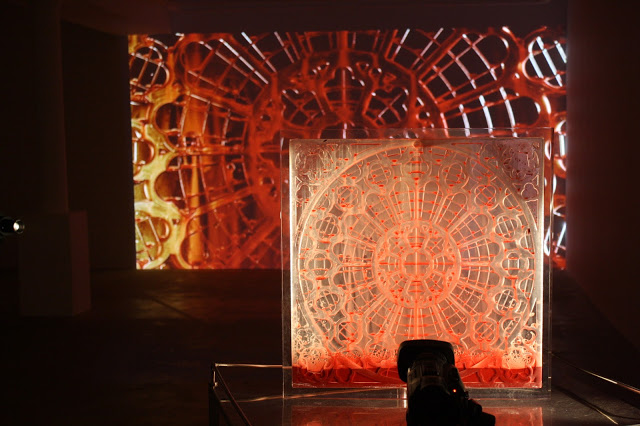
Installation shot from the 2013 Catholic Blood exhibition at Void Gallery in Derry.

A 2013 exhibition by Molodkin in the Void Gallery in Derry entitled 'Catholic Blood' was created specifically for the context of Derry and Northern Ireland. 'Catholic Blood' tapped into contentious historical divides in Ireland, as its subject is based in the Roman Catholic Relief Act 1829 and a particular clause of the British constitution that reportedly forbids any MP from advising the sovereign on ecclesiastical matters if they are of the Catholic faith, though this was disputed by Dr Bob Morris, an expert in constitutional affairs at University College London. Molodkin correctly asserted, "Yes, but there have been no Catholic prime ministers, perhaps when we talk about it we will get one." The work was controversial in its choice of materials which consisted of blood donated by local Catholics, a specification that was met with resistance. The project required the participation of the public, thirty-six people came forward to donate their blood, including the son of a Catholic Priest. The piece was constructed from hollowed acrylic blocks, mirroring the rose window of the Palace of Westminster. A pharmaceutical fridge contained samples of donated human blood and an industrial compressor pumped this blood through the cavity of the rose window in the acrylic block. This was simultaneously filmed and projected onto the gallery walls. Molodkin, reflecting on the exhibition and the vociferous reaction, stated: "Some people were angry that I hadn't used both Catholic and Protestant blood. They felt cheated that I had only chosen to use Catholic blood. It was never my intention to mix religions – the intensity is in the separation.

In 2024, in an installation called "Dead Man's Switch," Molodkin placed $45M worth of Rembrandt, Picasso and Warhol masterpieces in a 29-tonne, 13 ft by 9 ft Swiss safe at his studio. The safe contains a pneumatic pump connecting two barrels, one with acid powder and the other with an accelerator that could cause a chemical reaction strong enough to turn the safe's contents to debris within two hours. Molodkin says he'll destroy the artwork if Julian Assange dies in prison, or if the police and activists tries to seize the artwork from him.

He currently lives and works between the French capital, Paris, and Maubourguet in Southern France. His work is held in a number of significant public and private collections, including the Tate national collection.

== Solo exhibitions ==
2014

- Transformer No.M208, Ducal Palace, Genova.

2013

- Immigrant Blood, Patricia Dorfmann Gallery, Paris.
- Catholic Blood, Void Gallery, Derry.
- Post-Utopian Simulacrum, Wooson Gallery, Daegu.
- Crude, American University Museum, Washington, D.C.

2012

- Liquid Black, Museum Villa Stuck, Munich.

2011

- Crude, Station Museum of Contemporary Art, Houston.
- Transformer No.V579, Art Sensus Gallery, London.
- Sincere, Galleria Pack, Milan.
- Crude, Art Sensus, London

2010

- Absolute Return, Orel Art Gallery, Paris.

2009

- Andrei Molodkin: Liquid Modernity (Grid and Greed), Orel Art Gallery, London.
- Swiss Passion, Priska Pasquer Gallery, Cologne.
- Oil Evolution, Daneyal Mahmood Gallery, New York.

2008

- Guts à la Russe, Orel Art Gallery, Paris.

2007

- Direct From The Pipe, ANNE+ Art Projects, Ivry sur Seine, France.
- G8, Kashya Hildebrand Gallery, Zurich, Switzerland
- Sweet Crude American Dream, Daneyal Mahmood Gallery, New York

2006

- Cold War II, Orel Art Gallery, Paris
- Empire at War, Daneyal Mahmood Gallery, New York
- Sweet Crude Eternity, Kashya Hildebrand Gallery, Zurich, Switzerland

2005

- Sweet crude Eternity, Kashya Hildebrand Gallery, New York

2004

- Notre Patrimoine, European Parliament, Brussels
- Trash resources, Kashya Hildebrand Gallery, New York

2003

- Love Copyright, Orel Art Presenta Gallery, Paris
- Love Copyright, Kashya Hildebrand Gallery, New York

2002

- Polius, Chapelle Saint-Louis de la Salpêtrière, Orel Art Presenta Gallery, Paris
- Carré Noir Gallery, Paris

2001

- Novo Novosibirsk, The Marble Palace, Russian State Museum, St. Petersburg
- Blue Dream, Freud's Dream Museum, St. Petersburg

1999

- Novo Novosibirsk, Chapelle Saint-Louis de la Salpêtrière, Paris

== Literature ==
- Andrei Molodkin: Post-Utopian Simulacrum, eds. Wooson Gallery, Daegu, 2013.
- Andrei Molodkin: Crude, eds. Silvana Editoriale, The Station Museum, Houston, 2013.
- Andrei Molodkin: Absolute Return, eds. Silvana Editoriale, Musée d'Art Moderne de Saint-Etienne Métropole, France, 2011.
- Andrei Molodkin: Holy Oil, 2010.
- Andrei Molodkin: Liquid Modernity, 2009.
- Andrei Molodkin: Cold War II, eds. Victor Tupitsyn and Margarita Tupitsyn, Kashya Hildebrand Gallery, Zurich, 2007.
