= Katie Holten =

Irish artist

- Born: 22 September 1975 (age 51); Dublin, Ireland
- Education: National College of Art and Design; Hochschule der Kunste; Cornell University
- Occupation: visual artist
- Website: http://www.katieholten.com

Katie Holten is a contemporary Irish artist whose artwork focuses on humans' impact on the natural environment.

== Career ==
Her mother was a gardener and a floral artist. She graduated from National College of Art and Design in Dublin in 1998. In 2004 Holten was awarded a Fulbright Scholarship to develop her practice in New York. In 2002, Holten was awarded €20,000 as the winner of the AIB art awards. Holten was chosen to represent Ireland at the 50th Venice Biennale in 2003.

== Work ==
External videos
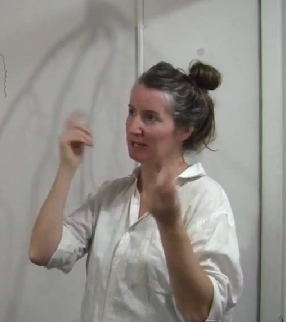
- "It's sort of a living thing but it's a non-living thing and it's the invisible part... A lot of my work tends to be invisible or very difficult to see.", Science History Institute, 2013

Holten's work is often made from recycled materials, and involves maps, plants, and various ecological subjects, provoking a dialogue on issues ranging from biodiversity to global warming.

Drawing is central to Holten's work. She is fascinated by the process of transforming two-dimensional drawings to three-dimensional works. "In a sense, no matter what form they end up taking, all of my works can be considered drawings. I have a wide-open understanding of what drawing is. It's lines created on a page, in space, on screen, on a wall, through walking, flying, talking, via graphite, ink, sand, stones, wind, sound, ether, time… Drawing is a way to chart what is there, what might be there, what could be there." In works like "Uprooted", the very shadows cast on the walls are part of the work.

In 2007 Holten was commissioned by The Bronx Museum of the Arts, Wave Hill and the NYC Department of Parks & Recreation to create "Tree Museum", a public artwork celebrating the 2009 centennial of the Grand Concourse, Bronx, NY. "She has marked out 100 trees along the Concourse, which is about four and a half miles long. Each one will have a sign that gives a phone number and a code to listen to short recordings of people speaking about the Bronx, their lives and their work."

== Exhibitions ==
- 2013
  - "Uprooted" in the Sensing Change Exhibit at the Chemical Heritage Foundation, Philadelphia, US.
- 2012
  - "Drawn to the Edge" in New Orlean's Museum of Art, New Orleans, US (15 June – 9 September 2012)
  - "Light and Landscape", Storm King Art Center, Mountainville, New York City (12 May – 11 November 2012)
  - Katie Holten, FUTURA, Prague, Czech Republic (11 September – 25 November 2012)
- 2011
- 2010
  - The Golden Bough, Dublin City Gallery The Hugh Lane, Dublin, Ireland
  - Solo exhibition, VAN HORN, Düsseldorf, Germany
- 2009
  - Green Platform, Palazzo Strozzi, Florence, Italy
  - Subversive Spaces, The Whitworth Art Gallery, University of Manchester, Manchester, UK
  - Public Art Commission, New York, The Bronx Museum of the Arts, Wave Hill, New York City Department of Parks and Recreation (solo)
  - Compilation IV, Kunsthalle Düsseldorf, Germany
- 2008
  - ATLAS of MEMORY, Nevada Museum of Art, Reno (solo)
  - IMPLANT, The Horticultural Society of New York at UBS, New York
  - Villa Merkel, Esslingen am Luckar, Germany (solo)
  - Klemens Gasser & Tanja Grunert, Inc. New York City (solo)
- 2007
  - Contemporary Art Museum St. Louis, Missouri, US (solo)
  - VAN HORN, Düsseldorf, Germany (solo)
  - Schuermann Berlin, Germany (solo)
  - Neuer Aachener Kunstverein, Aachen, Germany
  - Pforzheim Kunstverein, Germany
  - Angel Row Gallery, Nottingham, UK
- 2006
  - Institute of Contemporary Art, Philadelphia, Philadelphia, US
  - KBH Kunsthal, Copenhagen, Denmark (solo)
  - Fondation d'entreprise Ricard, Paris, France
  - Goettingen Kunstverein, Goettingen, Germany
  - GRAN BAZAAR, Centro Historico, Mexico City, Mexico (solo)
- 2005
  - Wiener Secession, Vienna, Austria
  - CREATIVE TIME, New York City
  - Wallspace Gallery, New York City
  - LMAK Projects, New York City
- 2003
  - Irish Pavilion, Venice Biennale, Italy
  - Butler Gallery, Kilkenny, Ireland
  - W139, Amsterdam, the Netherlands
- 2002
  - Temple Bar Gallery, Dublin, Ireland

== Bibliography ==
- Katie Holten, a Van Horn Press book published by Revolver, Germany, 2007, ISBN 978-3-86588-446-6
- Katie Holten: Paths of Desire, Contemporary Art Museum St. Louis, Missouri, 2007, ISBN 978-0-9777528-3-6
- GRAN BAZAAR, Tûp Institute and m o s t r a, printed in Mexico City, 2006, ISBN 0-9788046-0-0
- En Upassende Sandhed, Pork Salad Press, Copenhagen, 2006, ISBN 87-91409-30-6
- notional, Coracle Press, Clonmel, 2003, ISBN 0-906630-19-3
- Procumbent Notions, Pork Salad Press, Copenhagen, 2003, ISBN 978-87-91409-03-5
- Katie Holten and others: Drawings, Instances, Collaborations + Texts, Tûp Institute and Temple Bar Gallery and Studio, Dublin, 2002, ISBN 1-903895-03-0
