= Amanda Coogan =

Irish performance artist (born 1971)

- Born: 1971 (age 54–55); Dublin, Ireland
- Education: University of Ulster; Limerick School of Art and Design; Athens School of Fine Arts, Greece; National College of Art and Design, Dublin; HBK Hochschule fur Bildende Kunste
- Known for: Performance art
- Website: http://www.amandacoogan.com/

Amanda Coogan (born 1971) is an Irish performance artist, living and working in Dublin. She studied under the performance artist Marina Abramović at the HBK Hochschule für Bildende Kunste, Braunschweig, Germany. In her performance art, she produces videos and photographs from live performances. Her work often begins with her own body and often challenges the expectations born of context.

== Early life ==
Coogan was born in Dublin. She studied painting at Limerick School of Art and Design, Ireland, Athens School of Fine Arts, Greece, and Sculpture at the National College of Art and Design, Dublin and under the performance artist Marina Abramović at the HBK Hochschule fur Bildende Kunste, Braunschweig, Germany. She received her PhD from the University of Ulster in 2013.

== Career ==
In her performance art, she produces videos and photographs from live performances. Her work often begins with her own body and often challenges the expectations born of context. Not deaf herself, she is a first language signer and in one striking work, she dances to Gil Scott-Heron's "The Revolution Will Not Be Televised," while signing the lyrics. In a more recent work, produced for the Liverpool Biennial, she filmed local people headbanging to Beethoven's "Ode to Joy."

Coogan has exhibited at the Irish Museum of Modern Art, was an award winner at EV+A 2002 in Limerick, was selected by the Royal Hibernian Academy for the Eurojets Futures exhibition in 2003, and was an invited participant in the 2004 Liverpool Biennial. The Limerick City Gallery of Art hosted an exhibition of her installation work in 2005. She was part of Dublin Contemporary 2011.

During the 2020 COVID-19 pandemic she worked on a project about the Wrens of the Curragh.

=== Notable performances ===
Coogan has had numerous solo exhibitions, including:

- Amanda Coogan, Recycling the Future, Venice Biennale, Venice (2003)
- Amanda Coogan, A Brick In The Handbag, The Void, Derry, (2005)
- Amanda Coogan, The Fall, Kevin Kavanagh Gallery, Dublin, (2009)
- Amanda Coogan, The Passing, Museum of Fine Arts, Boston, Boston, (2011)
- Amanda Coogan, I’ll sing you a song from around the town, Royal Hibernian Academy, Dublin, (2015)
- Amanda Coogan, I’ll sing you a song from around the town, Limerick City Gallery of Art, Limerick (2017)
