= Vedovamazzei =

Italian artistic duo

Vedovamazzei is the moniker adopted by two Italian artists, Stella Scala and Simeone Crispino, who have been working together since 1991. The name "vedovamazzei" was on a door plate the two found on a street in Naples. It literally means "Widow Mazzei". Since the beginning of their collaboration, Vedovamazzei have used a wide range of media including sculpture, painting, installation and photography. The duo is also a founding member of the Italian artist-run magazine E il Topo (1992). They are currently based in Milan.

== Nave Emmet Native Amer ==
Their piece, Nave Emmet Native Amer (2011) was one of three pieces they chose to exhibit at the Dublin Contemporary 2011 exhibition, its theme being, "Terrible Beauty – Art, Crisis, Change and The Office of Non-Compliance". At first glance it looks as if two delicate pictures have been displayed on a plain wall. One picture is a floral design and the other one reproduces a series of circles in various sizes. The room they reside in is spacious and light and there is little to distract you from the simple beauty of the designs. It is not until you read the information panel that you discover the reason these two delicate and beautiful pictures fit together. They are made from the ashes, combined with oil paints, of two American prisoners who were sentenced to death. ‘The idea of death and transformation is illustrated by the piece while raising ethical issues with regard to its medium. Beautiful pictures resembling floral wallpaper are made using the ashes of an individual sentenced to death in America.'
