= Void Gallery =

Contemporary art gallery in Northern Ireland

The Void
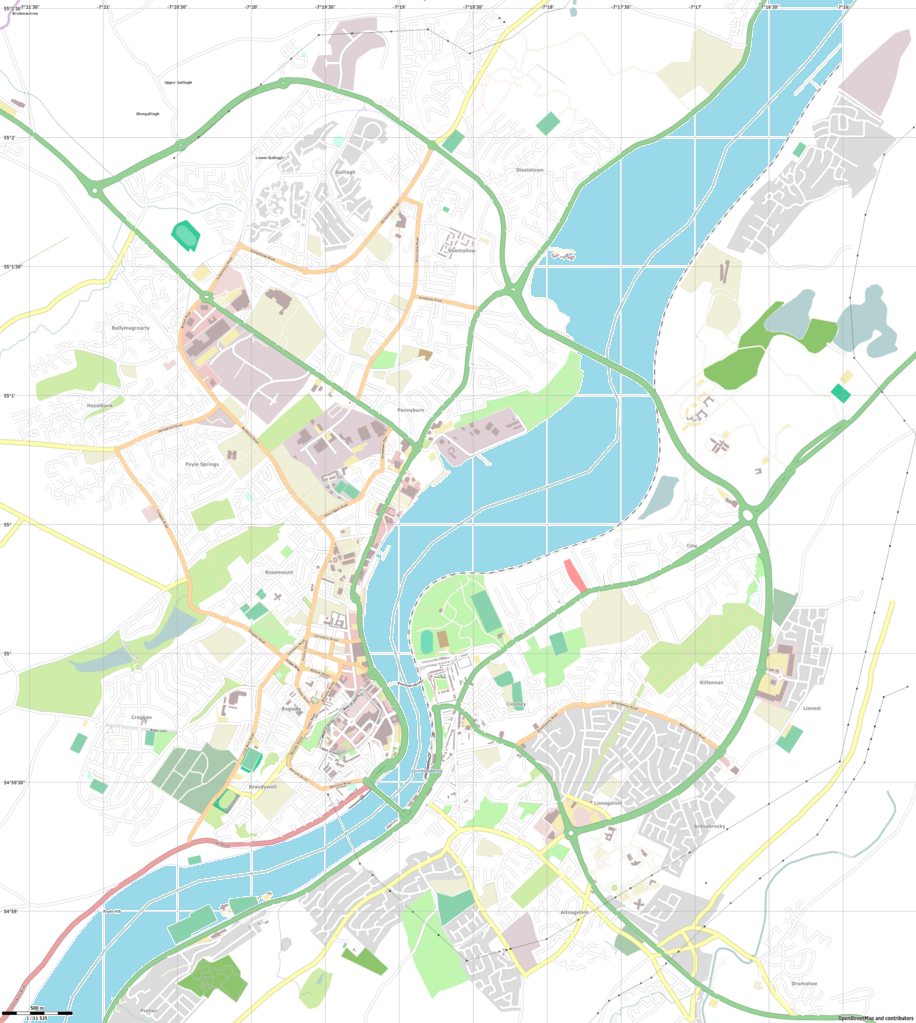
- Shown in Derry
- Established: 2003
- Location: Waterloo Place, Derry
- Coordinates: 54.9984205°N 7.3214192°W
- Type: contemporary art gallery
- Director: Vivianna Chechia
- Website: derryvoid.com

The Void (or VOID) gallery is a contemporary art gallery and events space in Waterloo Place, Derry, Northern Ireland. It began in 2003. Vivianna Chechia has been its director since May 2023, replacing Eamonn McCann.

In 2021 it moved to a new location in Waterloo Place. It received a grant of over £123,000 in 2021 from the Arts Council of Northern Ireland.

== Programmes ==
The gallery has hosted art events for toddlers, life drawing and film showings. It has staged art pieces outside of their buildings, including billboard exhibitions. Some of its exhibitions have been political in nature.

== Artists ==
Artists exhibited at the Void have included:

- Amanda Coogan
- Uwe Wittwer
- John Gerrard
- Niamh O'Malley
- Andrei Molodkin
- Niamh McCann
- Margaret Tait
- Pádraig Timoney
- Helen Cammock
- George Shaw
