= List of philosophers of art =

This is a list of aestheticians, notable philosophers of art, who theorize about the nature of art and beauty.

== Born before 17th century ==
- Abhinavagupta
- Thomas Aquinas
- Ibn Arabi
- Aristotle
- Augustine of Hippo
- Yusuf Balasagun
- Liu Xie
- Longinus
- Petrarch
- Plato
- Plotinus
- Quintilian

== Born in the 17th or 18th century ==
- Georg Anton Friedrich Ast
- Alexander Gottlieb Baumgarten
- Jean Anthelme Brillat-Savarin
- Edmund Burke
- Victor Cousin
- Jonathan Edwards
- Georg Wilhelm Friedrich Hegel
- Johann Friedrich Herbart
- Johann Gottfried Herder
- David Hume
- Francis Hutcheson
- Immanuel Kant
- Gotthold Ephraim Lessing
- Thomas Reid
- Friedrich Wilhelm Joseph von Schelling
- Friedrich Schiller
- August Wilhelm Schlegel
- Karl Wilhelm Friedrich von Schlegel
- Arthur Schopenhauer
- Johann Georg Sulzer
- Tyagaraja

== Born in the 19th century ==
- Vissarion Belinsky
- Clive Bell
- Walter Benjamin
- George Birkhoff
- Georg Brandes
- Ferruccio Busoni
- R. G. Collingwood
- Benedetto Croce
- John Dewey
- Ralph Waldo Emerson
- Etienne Gilson
- Eduard Hanslick
- Søren Kierkegaard
- Susanne Langer
- Vernon Lee
- György Lukács
- Herbert Marcuse
- Jacques Maritain
- Friedrich Nietzsche
- Walter Pater
- Hans Pfitzner
- Edgar Allan Poe
- John Ruskin
- George Santayana
- Viktor Shklovsky
- Algernon Charles Swinburne
- Jun'ichirō Tanizaki
- Oscar Wilde

== Born in the 20th century ==
- Theodor Adorno
- Rudolf Arnheim
- Sri Aurobindo
- Roland Barthes
- Georges Bataille
- Max Black
- Maurice Blanchot
- Harold Bloom
- John Cage
- Stanley Cavell
- Arthur Danto
- Jacques Derrida
- Umberto Eco
- Michel Foucault
- Hans-Georg Gadamer
- Nelson Goodman
- Antonio Gramsci
- Clement Greenberg
- John Hospers
- Siri Hustvedt
- Mani Kaul
- Joseph Kosuth
- Jean-François Lyotard
- André Malraux
- Michael Oakeshott
- Ayn Rand
- John Roberts (philosopher)
- Edward Said
- Roger Scruton
- Eli Siegel
- Richard Wollheim
