= Project Arts Centre =

Irish arts venue based in Dublin

- Location within Central Dublin
- Address: 39 East Essex Street; Temple Bar, Dublin; Ireland
- Coordinates: 53.345°N 6.26624°W
- Owner: Auditorium 200 seats Cube 80 seats
- Type: Theatre and gallery

Construction
- Opened: 1967; 59 years ago
- Rebuilt: 2000
- Years active: 1966 to present
- Architect: Shay Cleary Architects

Website
- www.projectartscentre.ie

Project Arts Centre is a multidisciplinary arts centre based in Temple Bar, Dublin, which hosts visual arts, theatre, dance, music, and performance.

== History ==
Project Arts Centre was founded by Jim FitzGerald and Colm O'Briain in 1967 after a three-week festival at the Gate Theatre in 1966. Project Arts Centre was the first such arts centre in Ireland.

The Centre had several homes before it opened for business in a converted factory on East Essex Street in 1975, after numerous issues regarding funding. This building was demolished in 1998 and a new purpose-built space containing two auditoriums, a gallery and a bar opened on the same site in 2000, as part of the second phase of the regeneration of Temple Bar. The presence of the Centre, along with a number of other cultural institutions in Temple Bar, such as Irish Film Institute, the Temple Bar Gallery and Studios, Black Church Print Studios, the Gallery of Photography, and Temple Bar Music Centre (now the Button Factory), inspired the regeneration of the area as a cultural quarter.

== The Centre ==
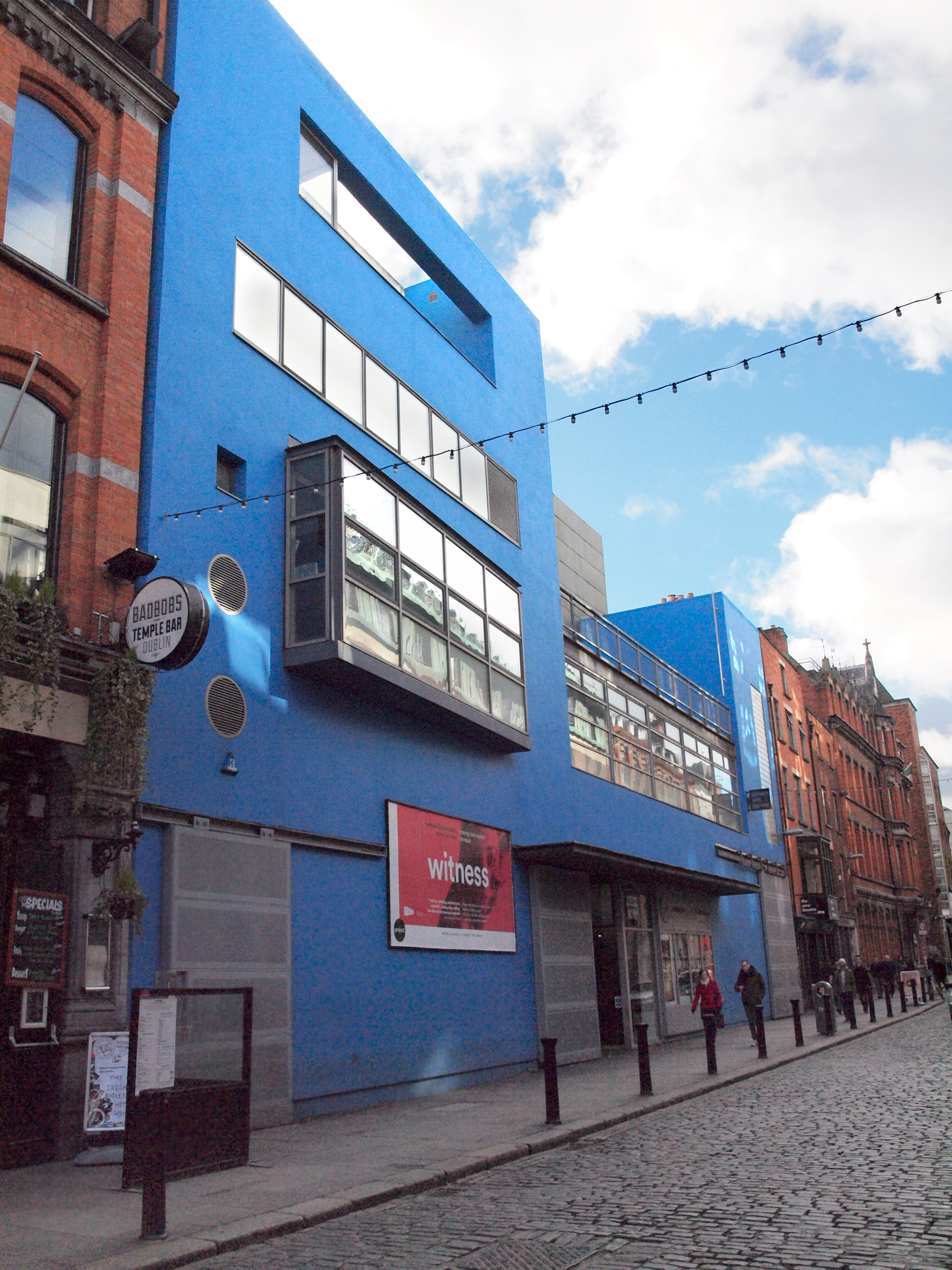

The centre has been a venue for many of the city's performing arts festivals, including the Dublin Dance Festival, Dublin Writers Festival, Dublin Fringe Festival and Dublin Theatre Festival. Since the Irish recession there has been an emphasis on cross-cultural productions.

In 2018, street artist Maser painted a mural in support of the Repeal the 8th "pro-choice" campaign, but the Centre was pressured by the Irish Government to paint over it.

Romantic Ireland, an exhibition by Eimear Walshe, curated by Sara Greavu and Project Arts Centre, was selected for the Irish Pavilion at the 60th International Art Exhibition of the Venice Biennale (2024).
