= Lissie Habie =

Guatemalan photographer

- Born: Elizabeth Habie Denburg; 1954
- Died: 2008 (aged 53–54)

Lissie Habié (also known as Elizabeth Habie Denburg; 1954–2008) was a Guatemalan photographer.

== Career ==
Her work is included the collections of the Brooklyn Museum, the Lehigh University Art Galleries, the Centre Pompidou, Paris, the Pérez Art Museum Miami, Florida, and the Museum of Fine Arts Houston.

== Personal life ==
Habié was married to photographer Mitchell Denburg. They have two daughters, Jessica Habie (a filmmaker) and Jamie Denburg Habie (a photographer), as well as multiple foster daughters.

== See also ==
Christian Viveros-Faune's biography Lissie Habie: A Life in Pictures (2014).
