= Kysa Johnson =

American artist

Kysa Johnson (born 1974, Evanston, Illinois) is a contemporary artist whose drawings, paintings, and installations explore patterns in nature that exist at the extremes of scale. Using the shapes of subatomic decay patterns, maps of the universe, or the molecular structure of pollutants or of diseases and cures – in short, microscopic or macroscopic “landscapes” – Johnson's work depicts a physical reality that is invisible to the naked eye. Often these micro patterns are built up to form compositions that relate to them conceptually. Johnson graduated with honors from the Glasgow School of Art in Glasgow, Scotland. She has exhibited at, among other venues, The Aldrich Museum of Contemporary Art, The Tang Museum, The DeCordova Museum, Dublin Contemporary, The Nicolaysen Museum, The Katonah Museum of Art, The Hudson River Museum, The 2nd Biennial of the Canary Islands, The National Academy of Science, Morgan Lehman Gallery, Von Lintel Gallery, and Halsey McKay. Her work has been written about extensively in publications including Artforum, The New York Times, Interview Magazine, and The San Francisco Chronicle. Her work is included in many public collections including MIT, Microsoft, The Progressive Collection, Deutsche Bank, and Credit Suisse. She is a NYFA fellow (2003) and Pollock Krasner Grant recipient (2010).

== Career ==
In the fall of 2004, Kysa Johnson had a solo exhibition with the National Academy of Sciences in Washington, DC. Her work was formerly on display at the Empire State Building (in 2000 she was commissioned to create an installation of six paintings for the concourse level in The Empire State Building), but in a January 2014 lawsuit, Johnson alleged that the building's owner had told her that the paintings "could not be located, were likely destroyed and therefore could not be returned." She has exhibited in, among other venues, the Royal Scottish Academy in Edinburgh, the Glasgow School of Art and the Muhlenberg College.

In a series of her works, Johnson combines art historical references to paintings of the Immaculate Conception with the drawn forms of bacteria and other life forms that reproduce asexually. In some of these works Johnson used El Greco's paintings of the Immaculate Conception as the compositional framework for some of her works. According to Helen A. Harrison "the images are both literal and metaphoric -- clever, subversive conflations of the biblical and the biological" -- "stare at them for a while, and the El Greco underpinnings emerge".

In the Spring of 2007, Johnson had a solo exhibition at The Aldrich Contemporary Art Museum in Ridgefield, CT. The work for this exhibition was based on the molecular structure of the environmental pollutants ethane, methane, benzene, propane, and acrolein. These structures were patterned into compositions based on Hudson River School Landscape Paintings. Harry Philbrick, the director of the Aldrich Museum, writes, " The link between these two views—one historical, one contemporary; one macro, one micro; one rooted in art history, one rooted in environmental history—is the patterning Johnson discerns in nature and art. Earlier paintings linked art historical images of Immaculate Conception (think Mary begetting Jesus) with scientific examples of Immaculate Conception (think asexually reproducing yeast or asexually reproducing bacteria). The microscopic image of the latter was patterned to produce an image of the former. So with microscopic views of benzene does Johnson build an image of the Delaware."

For Johnson, drawing has always been a means to explore our surroundings and to try to come to understand the world around us in a deeper way – scientifically, emotionally, and intellectually. In email correspondence with the author she states, "my work has always been about patterns in nature.... the "landscapes" of the microcosmic and macrocosmic."

It is this natural affinity to viewing nature either through a microscope or a painting which allows Johnson to see with her naked eye that which we often miss – the inherent complexity of our ecosystem. By this I mean more than just the complex natural phenomena at play in the Delaware River, but also the psychological, cultural, and historical overlay which is part of the landscape. We create stories about nature and they inform our view of landscape. Nature creates stories about us in the landscape as well; written in methane and propane and there for the reading, if only you choose to look."

A 2014 article by Rachel Small in Interview Magazine explores common themes in her work in relation to her solo show at Halsey McKay Gallery.

Johnson has been awarded a Pollack Krasner Foundation Grant (2010), the NYFA (New York Foundation for the Arts) fellowship in 2003 and the Emmy Sachs Prize.
