= Jaki Irvine =

Irish artist, filmmaker and novelist (born 1966)

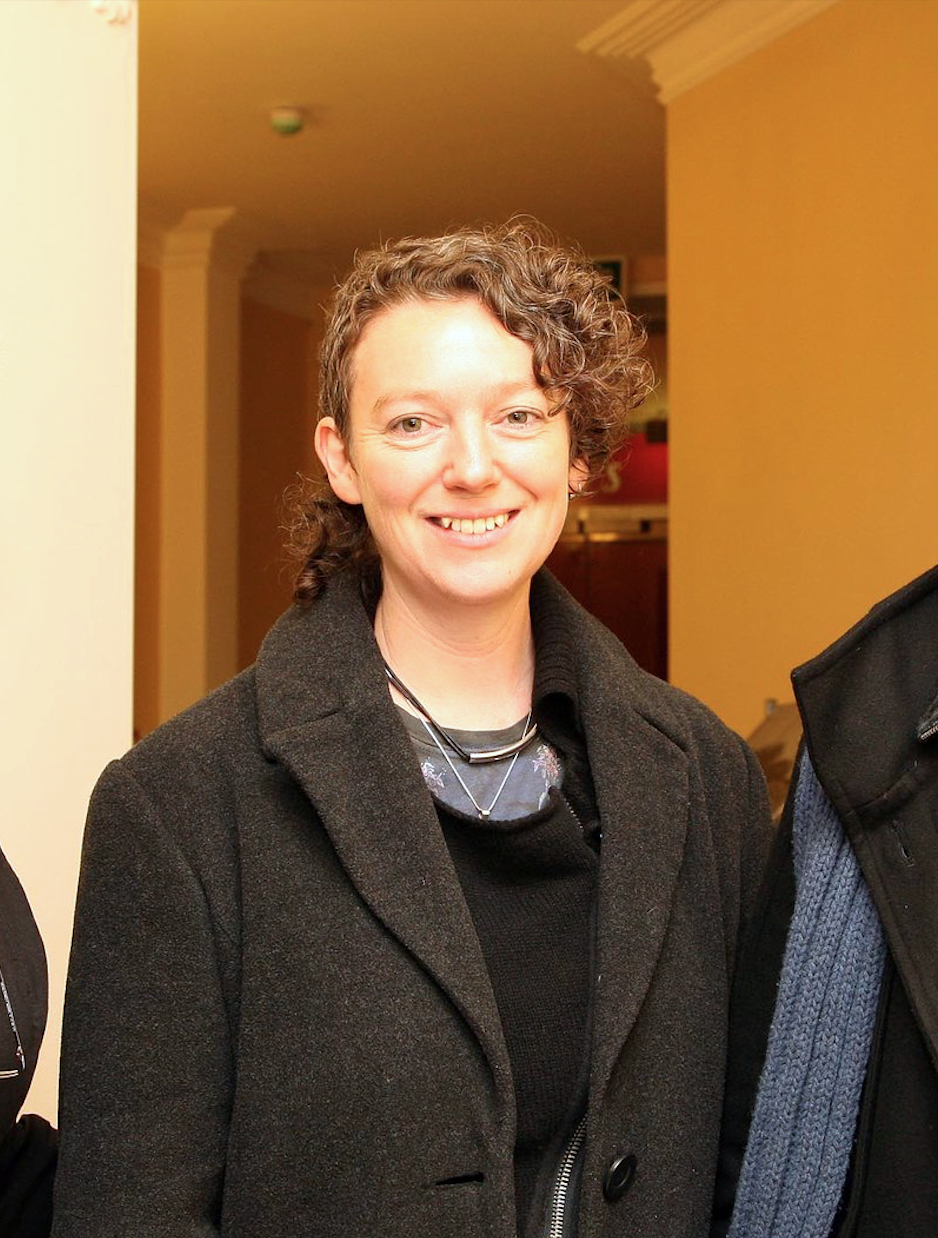
- Irish video artist Jaki Irvine
- Born: 1966 (age 59–60); Dublin
- Elected: Aosdána
- Website: www.jakiirvine.org

Jaki Irvine is an Irish contemporary visual artist, specialising in music and video installations, and a novelist. Elected to Ireland's national affiliation of artists, Aosdána, she represented the country at the 1997 Venice Biennale. She divides her time between Dublin and Mexico City.

== Career ==
She represented Ireland at the Venice Biennale in 1997 with Alastair Mac Lennan. In 2013 she wrote a novel, Days of Surrender, a fictional account of women in the Easter Rising. Irvine elaborated on the book through a video, music, and photography installation commissioned by the Irish Museum of Modern Art and shown also at Frith Street Gallery in 2016, called If the Ground Should Open. In 2018, her work was exhibited in Dwelling Poetically: Mexico City, a case study, curated by Chris Sharp in Melbourne, Australia. Irvine's solo exhibition, Ack Ro’, shown at the Kerlin, opened in January 2020 and features 28 neon signs, using lyrical fragments from Neil Diamond’s song Cracklin’ Rosie, as well as a number of video works.

Irvine is a member of Aosdána, is represented by the Kerlin Gallery (Dublin) and Frith Street Gallery (London), and has works in the collection of the Irish Museum of Modern Art.

== Work ==
Irvine's practice has been described as difficult to define, however, "music has been an important component of Irvine’s work", a recent example of this type of work includes the lauded If the Ground Should Open. It was commissioned "for the centenary of the Easter Rising and, specifically, the subsequent understated role of women in the rebellion" at the Irish Museum of Modern Art. It took the form of an installation included many videos of musicians and singers performing scores composed by Irvine. She has used neon in some of her work. In her film installations she utilises 16 mm film and 8 mm film, weaving real events with fictitious narratives.

== Critical reaction ==
Art in America writes: "Her works manage to wear their own artifice openly, even awkwardly, without becoming reductively trite or archly postmodern. They seduce us even as they reveal the tricks of their seduction. This is the beguiling—and redeeming—paradox of her art."

== Bibliography ==
- Irvine, Jaki. Days of surrender. Ventnor, Isle of Wight: Copy Press, 2013. ISBN 9780955379284
- Irvine, Jaki, Michael Newman, and Sarah Glennie. The square root of minus one is plus or minus i. Milano New York City: Charta, 2008. ISBN 9788881587025
- Cross, Dorothy, et al. Leaves and papers 1-6: a Gallery 3 project. Dublin: Douglas Hyde Gallery, 2008. ISBN 9781905397099
- Irvine, Jaki. Jaki Irvine: plans for forgotten works: 2 July - 2 October 2005: Gallery 4 Henry Moore Institute. Leeds: Henry Moore Institute, 2005. ISBN 9781900081795
- Irvine, Jaki. Towards a polar sea [published on the occasion of the exhibition held at the Frith Street Gallery, London, September - October 2005. London: Frith Street Books, 2005. ISBN 9780951495346
- Nelson, Mike, and Jaki Irvine. Mike Nelson: extinction beckons. London: Matt's Gallery, 2000. ISBN 0907623344

== See also ==
- Video art
- Installation art
