= Angel Otero =

American painter

- Born: 1981 (age 44–45); San Juan, Puerto Rico
- Education: School of the Art Institute of Chicago.

Angel Otero (born 1981) is a Puerto Rican contemporary visual artist, who specializes in painting.

Otero's work is characterized by an interest in personal history, expressionistic abstraction, and Spanish Baroque painterly traditions. He lives and works in New York but splits his time between Brooklyn and Upstate New York.

== Early life and education ==
Otero was born and raised in Santurce in San Juan, Puerto Rico. At age 24, Otero moved to Chicago to earn a Master's of Fine Arts from the School of the Art Institute of Chicago.

== Career ==
His relationship with his family, his life in Puerto Rico, and his personal history figure greatly in his artwork. Stylistically, Otero practices a process-based art that combines painting and assemblage. Otero creates “oilskins, " which are created from paint poured onto glass and peeled off in sheets after drying. These skins are then grafted onto the artist’s canvas or sculpture. Otero combines them with other materials including resin, spray paint, and silicone. Both small and large-scale paintings are created using this method.

Otero has exhibited internationally in solo and group exhibitions. In 2011 he had his first solo exhibition, entitled Memento, in New York at Lehmann Maupin Gallery. Otero has shown his work in solo exhibitions at the Chicago Cultural Center (2010), Kavi Gupta (2009), the Contemporary Art Workshop Gallery (2008), and the Union League Club of Chicago (2008). He also took part in the group exhibition The [S] Files/The Street Files at El Museo's 6th Bienal, which took place in 2011 at El Museo del Barrio in New York. Otero's group exhibitions include Misericordia curated by Birte Kleeman, Prism, Los Angeles (2010); Touched, Lehmann Maupin Gallery (2010); Constellations: Paintings from the MCA Collection, Museum of Contemporary Art, Chicago (2009); New Wave curated by Christian Viveros-Faune, Galeria Leyendecker, Spain (2008). Otero participated in Art Basel Miami Beach and The Armory Show, both in 2010. In the previous year, he was awarded the Leonore Annenberg Fellowship in the Performing and Visual Arts.
