= Wilfredo Prieto =

Cuban artist (born 1978)

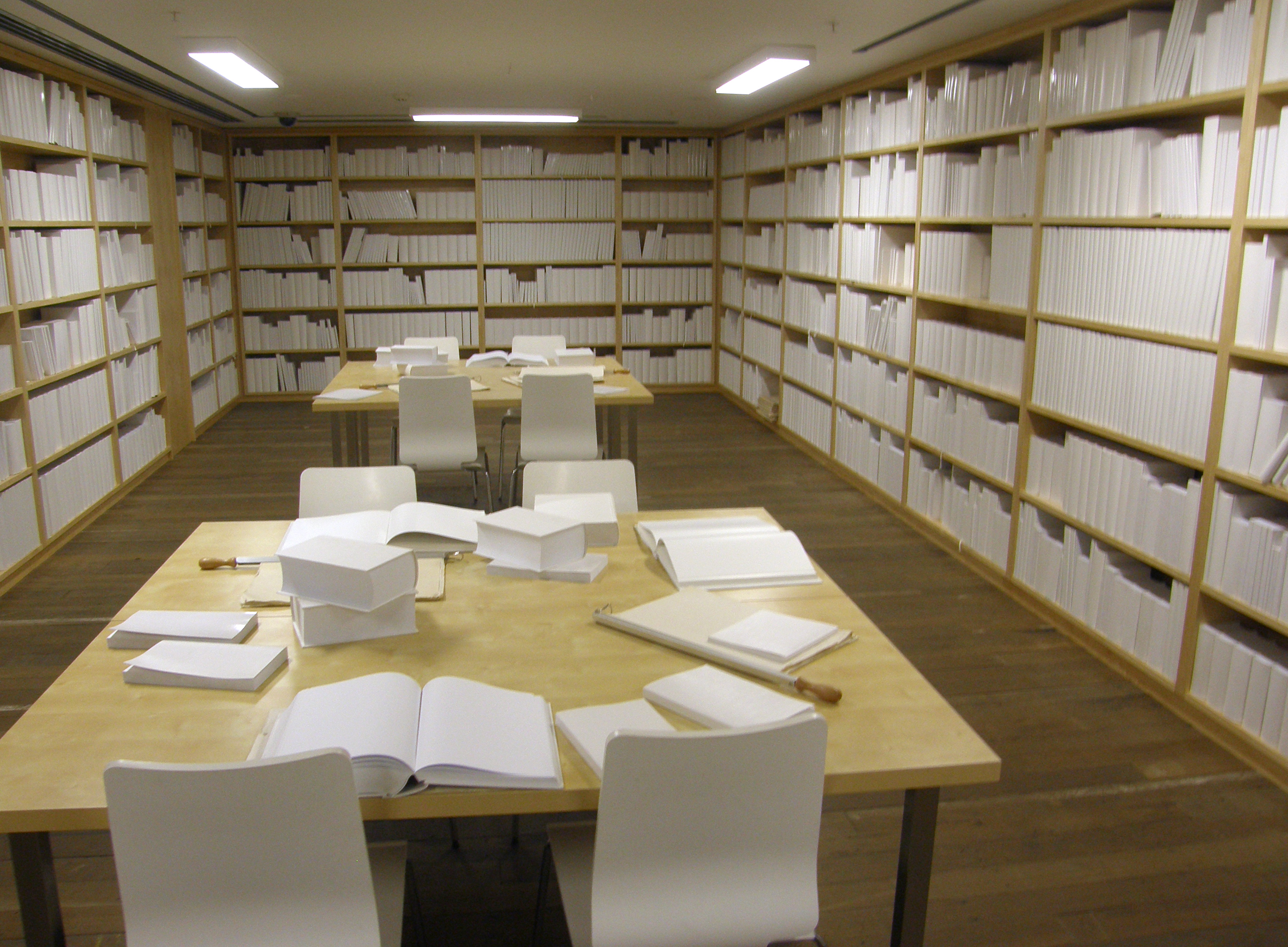
- Wilfredo Prieto's "Untitled" (White Library), which is now situated on the second sub level of MONA in Hobart, Tasmania.
- Born: 1978 (age 47–48); Sancti Spíritus, Cuba
- Education: Instituto Superior de Arte
- Known for: Conceptual art, Installation art
- Movement: Conceptual art
- Awards: Cartier Foundation Award (2008)

Wilfredo Prieto (born 1978; Sancti Spíritus, Cuba), is a Cuban conceptual artist. He is best known for using absurdist and subversive humor to explore contemporary politics and the current sociopolitical state of the world.

He moved to Havana to pursue his art studies at The University of Arts of Cuba (ISA), graduating in 2002.

== Overview ==
He has a university diploma as a painter but has not painted for the last 10 years. He admires the conceptualist Marcel Duchamp but seeks to distance himself from traditional approaches to art and to work independently of specific historical or cultural frameworks. Havana serves as a point of reference in his work.

His medium keeps changing, it depends on the particular idea or the concept he is working on and he never gets attached to any way of working. Most of the time, the missing elements in Prieto's work are obvious.

In fact, in 2001, he did his most widely known work “Apolítico” with 30 flagpoles stripped of their familiar colours. This show has been shown in Ireland, Italy and France. In 2004, the more than 5,000 books that comprised his Biblioteca Blanca were utterly blank (White Library). This show went to the biennial exhibitions in Singapore and Venice, and will travel next to Austria. For the 2006 Havana Biennial, he contributed a rotting banana peel, a bar of soap and a daub of axle grease, which he placed in a neat little pile on a floor of the exhibition space. He tampers with the ordinary until it becomes unlikely but not entirely impossible. In 2006, he also transformed a Canadian art museum into a dance club, with disco lights, dance-floor, and everything except the music (Mute). In 2007, in a Barcelona gallery he once laid a rug in the middle of the floor, then carefully combed the gallery space for all the little bits of dirt and dust he could find, which he then swept under the rug (Untitled/Red Carpet).

One of his most recent works is called "Walking the dog and eating shit", which was a number of public exhibitions he did in Lennon Park in Havana.

Prieto recently won the 2008 Cartier Award, which entitles him to a three-month residency in London. He plans to use the time there to install a project he calls Estanque (Pond), which consist in covering the top of 100 oil barrels with a layer of water and serving as a makeshift habitat for a living frog.

== Prizes and grants ==
- 2013 Beca de Artes Plásticas Fundación Botín, Santander
- 2011 Seleccionado para el Premio Internacional de Arte Diputació de Castelló
- 2010 Seleccionado para Future Generation Art Prize 2010, Kiev, Ucrania
- 2008 The Cartier Foundation Award, con residencia en Gasworks, Londres.

Premio F, Buenos Aires Beca de Creación Norte 08, Zaragoza

- 2007 Residencia en Le Grand Café, St Nazaire, Francia
- 2006 Residencia John Simon Guggenheim Foundation, Nueva York
- 2005 Kadist Art Foundation, Paris, residencia
- 2001 Segundo Premio, Salón Provincial Oscar F. M., Sancti-Spíritus
- 2000 Premio a la mejor curaduría 2000, Galería Habana, DUPP, La Habana. The 2000 UNESCO

Prize for the Promotion of the Arts, VII Bienal de la Habana, DUPP, La Habana

- 1997 Asociación Hermanos Saíz, Sancti-Spíritus, beca Nubes Verdes

== Collections ==
- Art Gallery of Ontario (AGO), Ontario, Canadá
- CA2M, Comunidad de Madrid, Madrid, España
- Centre Pompidou, París, Francia
- CIFO, Miami, Estados Unidos
- Colección Adrastus, Mexico D.F., México
- Colección Patricia Phelps de Cisneros (CPPC), Nueva York, Estados Unidos
- Col·lecció Cal Cego, Barcelona, España
- Collection Museum of Old and New, Tasmania, Australia
- Coppel Collection, Mexico D.F., México
- Daros Latinamerica Collection, Zúrich, Suiza
- Fonds régional d'art contemporain corse (FRAC Corse), Francia
- Fundación/Colección Jumex, México D.F., México
- Solomon R. Guggenheim Museum, Nueva York
- MUDAM Collection, Luxembourg
- Museo Nacional de Bellas Artes, La Habana
- Museum of Old and New Art, Hobart, Tasmania
- Peter Norton Family Collection, California
- S.M.A.K., Gante, Bélgica
- Verbund Collection, Viena

== Articles and reviews ==
- Lazo, Direlia. Wilfredo Prieto en la mira. Art OnCuba No. 03, julio-septiembre, 2014, pp. 70–75
- Wilfredo Prieto (Entrevista). Elephant. The Art and Visual Culture Magazine, número 19, verano 2014, pp. 154–155.
- Lazo, Direlia. Wilfredo Prieto. Hangar Bicocca, ArtNexus, No. 89, 2013, pp. 94–95
- Mosquera, Gerardo. A one liner philosopher, Art in America, septiembre 2012
- Alessi, Chiara. Wilfredo Prie Balancing the curve, Art-Domus, Milán, agosto 2012
- Bardier, Laura. Wilfredo Prieto and the Work of Art as a Direct Gesture, Literature and Arts of the Americas, Issue 82, Vol. 44, No.1, 2011, pp. 143–148
- Guerrero, Inti. A question of choosing, Metropolis, Oct-Nov, 2011, pp. 47–53
- Hernández, Erena. Ser y nada, Atlántica Revista de Arte y Pensamiento, Centro Atlántico de Arte Moderno, #48/49, pp. 228–235
- Dalila López Arbolay, Parachute 125: La Havana, Les intuitions illogiques de Wilfredo Prieto, enero-marzo 2007
- Anaïd Demir, Jardin des Tuileries, Journal des Arts, 28 de octubre de 2006
- Barriendos, Joaquín, La ciudad latinoamericana como reflexión estética, Lars, Nº5, 2006
- Barriendos, Joaquín, The IX Biennial of Havana, FlashArt, Nº248, mayo-junio 2006
- Castillo, Hector Antón, Wilfredo Prieto, ArtNexus, Nº58 Vol.4, p. 130, 2005
- Oliver, Conxita, El qüestionament de la cultura, AVUI, Nº9837, 10 de febrero, 2005
- Peran, Marti, Wilfredo Prieto, Exit Express, Nº9, febrero, 2005
- Porcel, Violant, Los libros deshabitados, LaVanguardia, Culturas, 26 de enero, 2005
- Molina, Ángela, Biblioteques i camins que es bifurquen, El País, 20 de enero, 2005
- Sueza, Paula, Curator, enero/marzo, 2005
- D.Abreu, Andrés, Mucha abstracción, Diario Gramma, Año 8/Nº158, 6 de junio, 2004
- Rattemayer, Christian, 8 Bienal de Habana, Artforum, vol.XLII, n°6, febrero 2004
- Salgado, Gabriela, 8th Havana Biennial : The Bittersweet Taste of Utopia, FlashArt, Enero-Febrero, 2004, p. 47
- Papararo, Jenifer y Demkiw, Jains, Two perspectives on two collaborations, C Magazine, Winter, 2004
- Rodríguez Enríquez, Hilda Maria, Palo porque boga y palo porque no boga. Giros en la octava bienal, Artecubano, Dossier p. 16, Nº1, 2004
- Herzberg, Julia, ArtNexus, Nº52, 2004, p. 86
- Benítez Dueñas, Issa, extracto de ARCO 2004, ArtNexus, Nº53, p. 98
- Marx, Gary, Havana, Chicago Tribune, 20 de noviembre, 2003
- Gopnik, Blake, In Havana, an Air of Possibility, The Washington Post, 16 de noviembre de 2003
- D.Abreu, Andrés, Tras lo fiel a su mensaje, Diario Gramma, Año 7/Nº307, 3 de noviembre, 2003
- León Arévalo, Glenda, Intervenciones y performáticas epocales y abstraídas, Artecubano, Dossier p. 8, Nº2/3, 2003
- Mosquera, Gerardo, Del arte latinoamericano al arte desde América Latina, Art Nexus Nº48, abril, 2003, p. 70
- Antón Castillo, Héctor, El sediento sueña que bebe, La Jiribilla, abril 2003
- Noceda, José Manuel, Un texto infinito, AtlAntica, Nº37, p. 10

== Bibliography ==
- Wilfredo Prieto, Mousse Publishing, Milan, 2014
- Antes que todo, CA2M Centro de Arte Dos de Mayo, Comunidad de Madrid, Móstoles, Madrid (2010)
- Los Impolíticos, PANI Palazzo delle Arti Napoli Mondadori Electa, Nápoles, 2010
- Marroquí, Javier. y Arlandis, David, Cosas que solo un artista puede hacer, MARCO (Museo de Arte Contemporánea de Vigo) y MEIAC (Museo Extremeño e Iberoamericano de Arte Contemporáneo), 2010
- Gabriele Schor (ed.), Held Together with water- Kunst aus der Sammlung Verbund- Viena, 2007
- Olivares, Rosa (ed.), 100 Artistas Latinoamericanos, Exit Publicaciones, Madrid, 2007
- Medina, Cuauhtemoc. Neither In the Slime of the Earth Nor in the Purity of Heaven, Mute, McMaster Museum of Art, Hamilton, Canada, 2006
- Lazo Rodríguez, Direlia. Interview with Wilfredo Prieto, Mute, MacMaster Museum of Art, Hamilton, 2006, pp. 7–9
- Juncosa, Enrique, López, Sebastián y Valdés Figueroa, Eugenio, The Hours, Visual Arts of Contemporary Latin America, Irish Museum of Art, Daros-Latinamerica, Zürich, 2005
- Tannenbaum, Judith y Morales, René, Island Nations: New Art From Cuba, the Dominican Republic, Puerto Rico and the Diaspora, Rhode Island College of Design Museum, Providence, Rhode Island, 2004
- Hlavajova, Maria y Mosquera, Gerardo, Cordially Invited, BAK, basis voor actuele kunst, 2004
- Who if not we should at least try to imagine the future of all this?, Thinking Forward, Amsterdam, 2004
- Pera, Rosa, Doble seducción, INJUVE, Madrid, 2003
- Mosquera, Gerardo y Francisco, Rene, Wilfredo Prieto, Centro Cultural Español, La Habana, 2002
