= Maarten Vanden Eynde =

Belgian artist

Maarten Vanden Eynde (born in Leuven, Belgium, in 1977) is a Belgian artist. He lives and works in Brussels (Belgium) and Saint-Mihiel (France).

== Works ==
Maarten Vanden Eynde travels constantly around the world to observe divers complexe phenomena (ecology, anthropology, archeology). Vanden Eynde has invented "Genetology", the science that covers several research fields and that forms the theoretical bases of his practice. His work shows us that the usual observation grid to understand our world (opposition of technique and nature / human and not-human) are more and more obsolete and that new ones should be reinvented. The hybrid composition of society, the more and more developed sociotechnical networks make slide the forces but also the power stakes. The transformations are evidently multiple and we can find this in the formal aspect of his work.

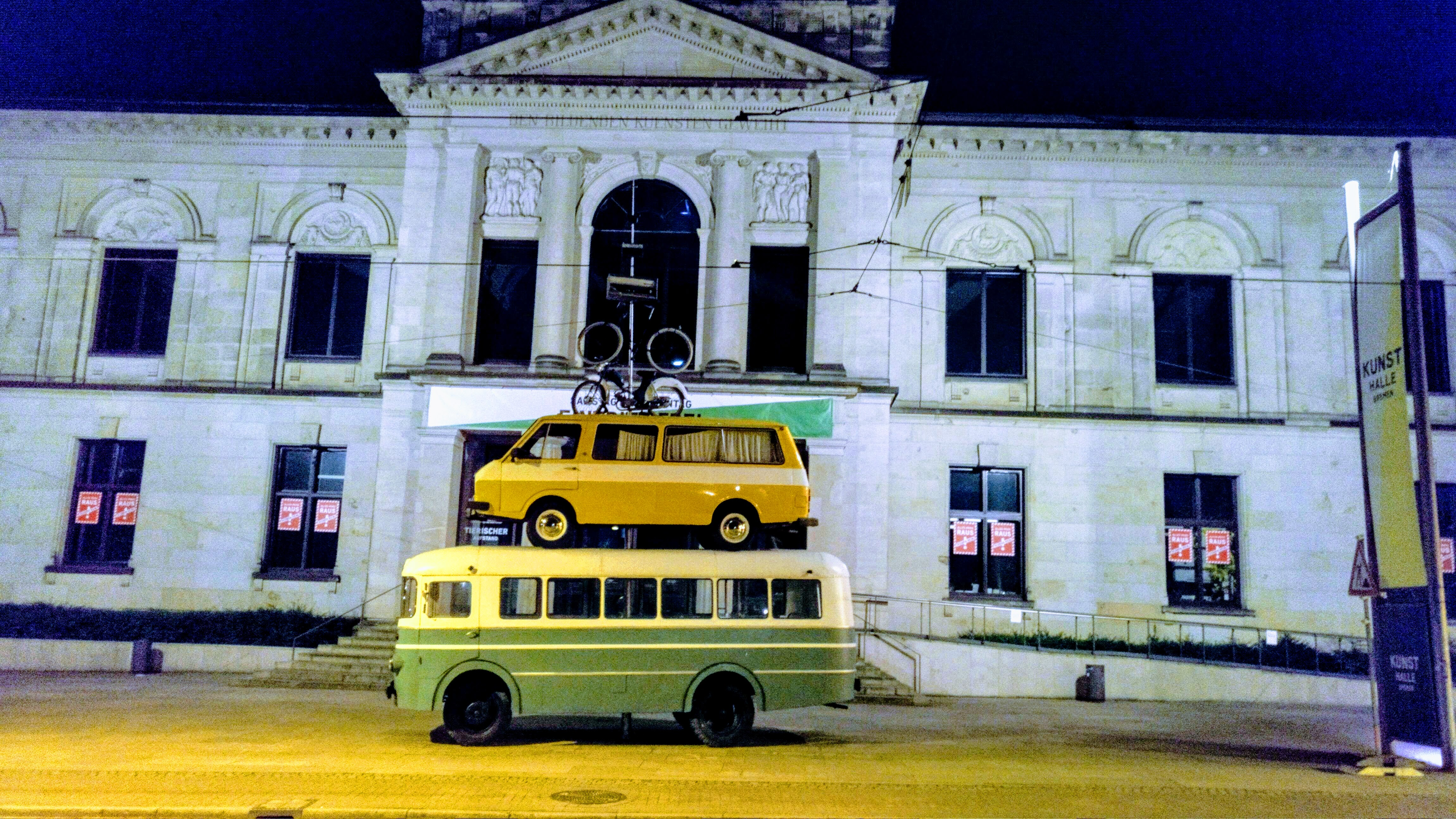
pinpointing progress by the Belgian artist Maarten Vanden Eynde in front of the Kunsthalle Bremen 2019

In Belgium his practice has received visibility in amongst others the M - Museum Leuven, Leuven and during Manifesta 9, Genk, and principally with his solo exhibition at the M HKA Antwerp. In 2015 his work has been shown in New Orleans (USA), Palazzo Reale in Milan, Italy, and in Lubumbashi, D.R. Congo, but also in Hangar H18 and the Royal Museums of Fine Arts of Belgium in Brussels, Belgium.

== Solo exhibitions ==
2016

- Catastrophic Casualties & Casual Catastrophes, Meessen De Clercq, Brussels (Belgium)

2014

- Art Rotterdam, Rotterdam (the Netherlands)

2013

- Brick Era A.D. 2013, special outdoor project at Art Brussels, Brussels (Belgium)
- Plastic Reef, Hordaland Artcenter, Bergen (Norway)
- IN_DEPENDANCE, Meessen De Clercq, Brussels (Belgium)

2012

- Museum of Forgotten History XXX, MuHKA, Antwerp (Belgium)
- Europe 2006–2014, FeliXart Museum, Drogenbos (Belgium)

2011

- Museum of Forgotten History, Art Brussels, Brussels (Belgium)

2010

- Gravitation, Kunstruimte Wagemans, Beetsterzwaag (the Netherlands)
- Industrial Evolution, Meessen De Clercq, Brussels (Belgium)
- Oil Peak, Art in the City, Egmont Park, Brussels (Belgium)

2009

- Homo Stupidus Stupidus, Waag Society, Amsterdam (The Netherlands)

2008

- The Museum of Forgotten History, Het Pand, Ugent, Ghent (Belgium)

2006

- From Russia With Love, Maes & Matthys Gallery, Antwerp (Belgium)
