= Cleary Connolly =

Video artist

Denis Connolly & Anne Cleary

Anne Cleary and her partner Denis Connolly, are installation and video artists collaborating under the name Cleary Connolly.

Exhibition artworks include the Meta-perceptual Helmets, a series of wearable artworks that transform vision and invite the viewer to become a living artwork, produced with Arts Council (Ireland) support in 2014, and Pourquoi Pas Toi? an interactive exhibition at the Pompidou Centre in 2009.

Recent collaborative projects include Less than Thirteen, a commission from the Barbican Centre exploring the movements of conductor Sir Simon Rattle. and the Eco Showboat voyage (2022-2023)

They were the recipients of the 2009 AIB Award for Irish artists of exceptional potential.

== Publications ==
- 2011 - In the Works Gandon Editions, Kinsale. ISBN 978-0-948037-81-8
- 2009 - Moving Dublin incl. DVD. Gandon Editions, Kinsale. ISBN 978-0-948037-69-6
- 2007 - Past and Presence incl. DVD. Gandon Editions, Kinsale. ISBN 978-0-948037-51-1
