= Willie Doherty =

Artist from Northern Ireland

- Born: 1959 (age 66–67); Derry, Northern Ireland
- Education: St Columb's College; Ulster Polytechnic
- Known for: Photography, Video

Willie Doherty (born 1959) is an artist from Northern Ireland, who has mainly worked in photography and video. He has twice been a Turner Prize nominee.

== Life and work ==
Doherty was born in Derry, Northern Ireland, and was educated at St Columb's College, Derry. From 1978 to 1981 he studied at Ulster Polytechnic in Belfast. As a child, he witnessed Bloody Sunday in Derry, and many of his works deal with The Troubles. Some of his pieces take images from the media and adapt them to his own ends.

These works by Doherty explore the multiple meanings that a single image can have. Doherty has suggested that this interest may stem from his witnessing of Bloody Sunday and subsequent knowledge that many photos of the incident did not tell the whole truth. Some of Doherty's earliest works are of maps and similar images accompanied by texts in a manner similar to the land art of Richard Long, except that here the text sometimes seems to contradict the image.

Doherty's video pieces are often projected in a confined space, giving a sense of claustrophobia. The videos themselves sometimes create a mood that has been compared to film noir.

Doherty has acknowledged the importance of the Orchard Gallery in Derry as a venue where he could see modern art in his formative years. He was a participant in Documenta (13).

== Critical reception ==
Riann Coulter wrote in The Irish Times that "Doherty is arguably the most significant Northern Irish artist of his generation." Aidan Dunne wrote in The Irish Times that Doherty has a "big international reputation" and that his exhibition in June 2013 at Art Basel had been "impressive".

National Museums Northern Ireland's Curator of Fine Art, Anne Stewart, said, "The Ulster Museum has long admired Willie Doherty, in particular the profoundly affecting ways in which his work explores themes of identity, territoriality and surveillance. His work frequently involves the layering of text and image, which creates a sense of ambiguity and plays on the viewer's prejudices and assumptions.”

== Collections ==
Doherty's work is held in the following permanent collections:

- Albright–Knox Art Gallery in Buffalo, New York
- Dallas Museum of Art, Dallas, Texas
- Dublin City Gallery The Hugh Lane, Dublin
- De Pont Museum of Contemporary Art, Tilburg
- The Irish Museum of Modern Art, Dublin
- Museum of Modern Art, New York City
- Tate, London
- The Carnegie Museum, Pittsburgh
- The Moderna Museet, Stockholm
- Kiasma, Helsinki
- De Appel, Amsterdam

== See also ==
- List of Northern Irish artists
