= John Roberts (philosopher) =

British philosopher of art and aesthetics

- Born: John Charles Roberts; 22 July 1955 (age 71)
- Occupations: Art theorist, philosopher, professor

Academic work
- Institutions: University of Wolverhampton
- Main interests: Aesthetics, Marxist cultural theory, avant-garde art, contemporary film, philosophical realism

John Roberts is a British art theorist and philosopher, whose work engages with Marxist cultural theory, avant-garde practice, contemporary film, skill and deskilling in art, philosophical realism, reason and unreason, politics and desire, practice and the productiveness of error. He is Professor of Art and Aesthetics at the University of Wolverhampton.

== Career ==
Roberts has written extensively on conceptual art, the avant-garde, and the relationship between art and labour, authoring numerous books published by academic presses including Pluto, Verso, Haymarket, and Brill. His work has been widely engaged with in debates on aesthetics, critical theory, and cultural politics.

Roberts' early book Postmodernism, Politics and Art received attention in British and international journals. In Parachute, Ellen L. Ramsay described it as "valuable reading" for those engaged in debates on postmodernism and representation. Writing in Contemporary Sociology, Wayne Wheeler characterised it as a document in the sociology of contemporary knowledge. Drew Milne in Radical Philosophy described the book as providing a helpful account of recent debates in English art.

He is Professor of Art and Aesthetics at the University of Wolverhampton, where he leads the Art, Philosophy and Social Practice research cluster and has contributed to international academic programmes, including teaching and seminars in Dublin and New York.

Roberts has also delivered public lectures at major venues, including the Institute of Contemporary Arts in London, where he discussed Revolutionary Time and the Avant-Garde with Peter Osborne (philosopher). He has appeared in academic documentaries, including one on the evolution, and then passing, of conceptual photography and art, produced by Source Photographic Review in 2012.

=== Curatorial work ===
In the 1980s and early 1990s, Roberts curated several exhibitions, including the Serpentine Summer Show (The Serpentine Gallery, 1983), the Aperto section of the Venice Biennale (1984), and the touring exhibition Approaches to Realism (1990–91).

== Selected works ==
- Postmodernism, Politics and Art (Manchester University Press, 1990)
- Selected Errors: Writings on Art and Politics, 1981–1990 (Pluto Press, 1992)
- The Philistine Controversy (co-edited with Dave Beech; Verso, 2002)
- The Art of Interruption: Realism, Photography, and the Everyday (Manchester University Press, 1998)
- Philosophizing the Everyday: Revolutionary Praxis and the Fate of Cultural Theory (Pluto Press, 2006)
- The Intangibilities of Form: Skill and Deskilling in Art after the Readymade (Verso, 2007)
- The Necessity of Errors (Verso, 2011)
- Photography and Its Violations (Columbia University Press, 2014)
- Revolutionary Time and the Avant-Garde (Verso, 2015)
- Thoughts on an Index Not Freely Given (Zero Books, 2016)
- The Reasoning of Unreason: Universalism, Capitalism and Disenlightenment (Bloomsbury, 2018)
- Red Days: Popular Music and the English Counterculture 1965–1975 (Minor Compositions/Autonomedia, 2020)
- Capitalism and the Limits of Desire (Bloomsbury, 2020)
- Art, Misuse and Technology: Micheál O'Connell's 'System Interference' (Uillinn, 2022)
- Art and Emancipation (Historical Materialism/Brill, 2023)
- ‘Trickster’, Oxford Art Journal 22:1 (1999), pp. 81–101
- ‘Unfitting: Art and Labour from Conceptualisation to AI’, The Nordic Journal of Aesthetics 33:67 (2024), pp. 26–42
- ‘Socially Engaged Art, Direct Democracy and Artistic Autonomy’ ARTMargins 14:1 (2025), pp. 6–33

== Reception ==
Barry Schwabsky, writing in *Art Journal*, called Roberts "one of the more original and independent thinkers among contemporary art historians" in his review of The Necessity of Errors.

Reviewing The Art of Interruption in Screening the Past, Sam Rohdie praised its treatment of Soviet art and Surrealism. Richard Pickup in The Art Book described it as an important contribution to debates around realism and representation.

Esther Leslie, writing in New Formations, described The Intangibilities of Form as exemplary of Roberts' materialist analysis of post-conceptual practice.

In Capital & Class, Benjamin Noys highlighted Philosophizing the Everyday for its rehistoricisation of the everyday and its emphasis on revolutionary praxis.

In *Radical Philosophy*, Steve Edwards described The Intangibilities of Form as "an important and ambitious book that rewrites the history of twentieth-century art through a concern with work."
