= Temple Bar Gallery and Studios =

Art gallery/studios in Dublin, Ireland

- Gailearaí + Stiúideonna Bharra an Teampaill

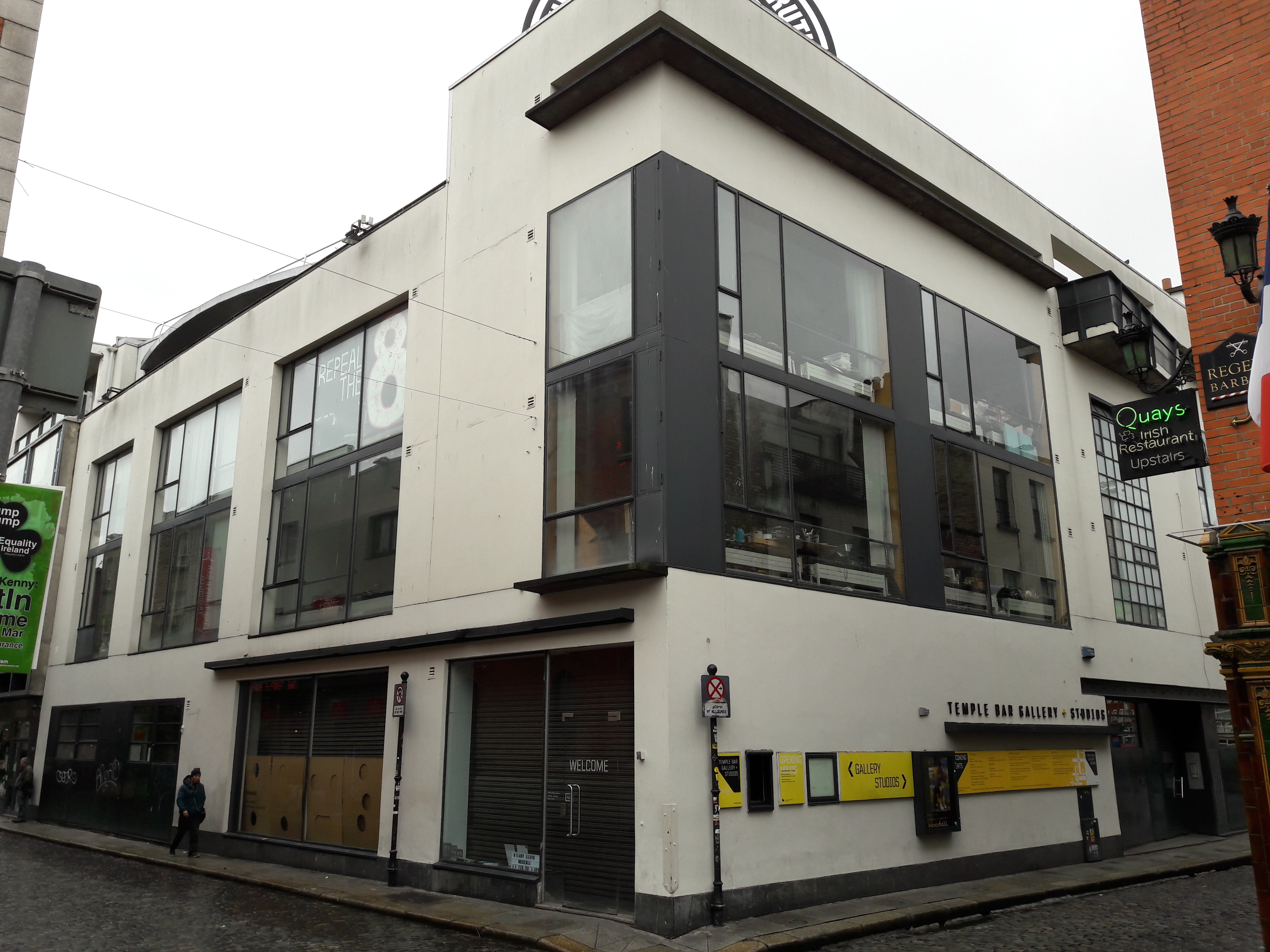

- Location within Central Dublin
- Established: 1983
- Location: 5–9 Temple Bar, Dublin, Ireland
- Coordinates: 53.345614°N 6.263723°W
- Type: Art gallery, Art studios
- Founder: Jenny Haughton
- Director: Cliodhna Shaffrey
- Chairperson: Niall M. Kelly
- Curator: Michael Hill
- Architect: McCullough Mulvin (1991 renovation)
- Public transit access: Trinity Luas stop (Green Line); Wellington Quay bus stop
- Website: templebargallery.com

Temple Bar Gallery + Studios (TBG+S) is a contemporary gallery and visual artist studio space located in the centre of Dublin in Temple Bar.

== History ==
Founded in 1983 "by artists for artists", Temple Bar Gallery + Studios’ mission is to: create, exhibit and engage. The original studios and gallery were located in a former shirt factory; this was overhauled by Irish architects McCullough Mulvin and completed in October 1994. The current building contains a contemporary visual art gallery and thirty artists studios. "Temple Bar Gallery’s physical character is noticeably susceptible to architectonic interventions, as many artists have fruitfully noticed. It is an off-square space, with pillars, openings, a shop-front aspect and other departures from white cube purity..."

Since 2007, TBG+S has been part of a residency exchange programme with HIAP (Helsinki International Artist Programme). The studios hosts a Finnish artist and selects an Irish artist for a studio residency in Finland. In 2008, the Finnish photographer Heli Rekula spent her year there.

In 2010, then-Director Marian Lovett was terminated from the position she had held at TBG+S since 2001. The gallery claimed it had made her position redundant after an Arts Council budget cut. She proceeded to seek legal action via the union IMPACT and in October 2012 the "claim by the former chief executive of a Dublin art gallery that her redundancy was 'a sham' has been upheld by the Employment Appeal Tribunal. The tribunal awarded €30,000 to Marian Lovett for unfair dismissal from her position as chief executive of Temple Bar Gallery and Studios."

That same year, Claire Power became the next Director and Rayne Booth was hired as Programme Curator, a position she held until 2018.

In 2013, a sculpture by Irish artist Garrett Phelan consisting of a metal arch bearing the words Our Union Only in Truth was added to the roof of the building. The commission was funded through an online crowd funding campaign.

In 2014, Clíodhna Shaffrey was made Director, and the studios debuted their Recent Graduate Residency which continues to this day. It provides recent Irish graduates the opportunity and resources to develop professionally via a stipend, travel award, and free studio space. TBG+S also received an Allianz Business to Arts Awards 2014 for Best Small Sponsorship the same year.

In 2019, Michael Hill was appointed Programme Curator.

Artist Niamh O'Malley was curated by TBG+S to represent Ireland at the 59th Venice Biennale, opening in April 2022.

== Organisation ==
Temple Bar Gallery + Studios is a limited company with charitable status. The voluntary Board is formally elected by the artist membership and comprises four artist members and five external professionals with different expertise and business acumen. TBG+S is a not for profit registered charity and receives much of its funding from the Arts Council of Ireland.

TBG + S provides "subsidised work spaces for professional visual artists". Artists must apply for Membership (six or three years) or Associate Membership/Project Studios (1 Year) and are reviewed by a Board appointed panel.

== Selected past exhibitions ==
- Mark Swords, "The living and the dead" (April – June 2017)
- Amie Siegel, "Imitation of Life" (February – April 2016)
- Charlotte Prodger, "Stoneymollan Trail" (December 2015 – February 2016)
- Rhona Byrne, "Huddle Tests" (September 2015)
- Curated by Gavin Wade with Celine Condorelli, Andrew Lacon, Eilis McDonald, Flore Nove Josserand, Yelena Popova, Gavin Wade, and Christopher Williams, "Display Show" (July 2015)
- Nathaniel Mellors, "The Sophisticated Neanderthal Interview" (September – November 2014)
- Priscila Fernandes, "Against the Enamel" (February – March 2014)
- Ed Atkins, "Or tears, of course" (February – March 2013)
- Curated by Chris Fite-Wassilak with Barbara Knezevic, Sean Meehan, Prinz Gholam, Jim Ricks, Iain Sinclair, and Josh Tonsfeldt, Temple Bar Gallery + Studios are Dead (November 2013 – January 2014)
- Nevan Lahart, "Won-Nil" (June – July 2012)
- Curated by Isobel Harbison with Alan Butler, Gabriele Beveridge, Juliette Bonneviot, Mick Peter, and Peles Empire, "Entrance Entrance" (April – June 2012)
- Luke Fowler Pilgrimage from Scattered Points (March 2011)
- Curated by Rayne Booth with Aleksandra Domanović, Joel Holmberg, Parker Ito, Eilis McDonald, Jonathan Rafman, "Offline", (April – May 2011)
- Mark O’ Kelly, "Leaders and Followers" (March – May 2010)
- John Duncan, "Bonfires" (February – April 2009)
- Colin Darke, "The Capital Paintings" (January – February 2008)
- Marjetica Potrč "Florestania" (October 2007)
- Paul Nugent, Vigil (September 2007)
- Risa Sato, Eoin McHugh, and Mark Garry, "Rapid Eye Movement"(Summer 2007)
- Matt Stokes Lost in the Rhythm – (January 2007)
- Lars Arrhenius, "If Signs had Souls" (July 2006)
- Elina Brotherus, "The New Painting" (June 2006)
- Garrett Phelan, "Black Brain Radio" (January 2006)
- Mark Clare, "Know Thyself "(August 2005)
- Ene-Liis Semper, "Licked Room" & "FF/REW" (March – April 2005)

== Bibliography ==
- Power, Claire, et al., Generation: 30 years of Creativity at Temple Bar Gallery + Studios 1983-2013, Dublin: Temple Bar Properties, 2013. ISBN 9781903895160
