= Rebecca Chamberlain =

American painter

- Born: 1970; Bryn Mawr, Pennsylvania
- Education: Philadelphia College of Art (now the University of the Arts), Rhode Island School of Design, Ravensbourne College of Design
- Occupations: Visual artist and vocalist
- Awards: NYFA Fellowship in Painting, 2012
- Website: rebecca-chamberlain.com

Rebecca E. Chamberlain is a visual artist and vocalist in the New York art band Maxi Geil! & Playcolt. She has exhibited her work in New York City, Boston, Los Angeles, Philadelphia, Jersey City, Amsterdam and Bologna, Italy, and been reviewed in the New York Times, Artforum, Art in America, Tema Celeste and Flash Art. She is currently represented by DODGEgallery in New York.

== Early life and education ==
Born in 1970 in Bryn Mawr Hospital, she grew up in Media and Broomall, in Pennsylvania's Delaware County. She starting studying ballet at an early age and became principal dancer of amateur ballet group Brandywine Ballet in West Chester in junior high school. After being injured, she decided that she wasn't fit to pursue ballet on a professional level. She told Art in America of this time "My frustration grew bigger than my pleasure and I wanted to work alone basically—not in front of mirrors, not in front of audiences, not beside anyone."

She attended the Rhode Island School of Design, where she majored in apparel design studying with, among other people, Lorraine Howes, and at the Ravensbourne College of Design in London for her study-abroad semester, graduating in 1991. After taking a job with designer Michael Leva and having already begun producing and selling her own line Iota through an East Village boutique, she moved to New York City.

== Visual art career ==
Chamberlain's work includes large-scale drawings of early modernist interiors made in ink on a material known as "vintage tracing cloth" that was developed around 1910 to be used as an architectural drafting paper. She started in ballpoint pen—blue or black Bic, diluted—applying it by brush. In 2009, she started to depict 1930s domestic, office, and factory interiors in watered down lithographic ink on a large scale. The next year she began casting lead crystal panels to accompany the drawings, and in 2011 started to incorporate soundtracks to her exhibitions with musical collaborator Kenn Richards and presented her first solo exhibition in New York City at DODGEgallery.

The work, at its base, is a contemplation of the difference between modernism's ideals and its physical actuality and the idea of the live-and-workspace as an extension of the self, capitalizing on the delusion of the interwar period of early modernism. An art reviewer for Time Out magazine characterized it as having a "beautifully elegiac air" whereas a reviewer for the New York Times described the same work as "ooz[ing] loneliness." Artforum's Nuit Banai notes the work's "double dynamic" of disavowal and confirmation while Art in America's Aimee Walleston sees the work as posing questions, "The art is an unadulterated exaltation of Modernism—yet its absence of figures induces viewers to wonder: did fantastic things really happen here? Or are the interiors Chamberlain investigates sites for a magnificent moment that could never really be?"

In 2015 Chamberlain wrote about the 17th century Shoin rooms at the Metropolitan Museum of Art for the Brooklyn Rail. She wrote "I am interested in the fact that this room is both old and new, that we look at it through a reconstruction, that is, through another's gaze.... Hovering between the two-dimensional and three-dimensional, my reconstructions distill the desire that is latent in these spaces, a desire to control and improve human behavior, to make us saner, healthier, or just more beautiful. When I stand in front of this reconstruction at the Met, I feel the distillation happening here as well."

Her work was included in Trent Morse's 2016 book Ballpoint Art (Laurence King Publishing), which also included the work of Cy Twombly, Alberto Giacometti, and Dawn Clements. Her drawings are also on offer on pillows via artmultiple.com.

== Music career ==
=== 1998 to 2002 ===
Having studied opera for a couple of years under Gina Crusco, Chamberlain joined her New York City Underworld Productions Opera remaining a member until 2006. In 1992, she began singing and writing music with artist and composer David Abir whom she met at a summer program in Philadelphia when they were both in high school: Their band's name was (SIGH). She next became lyricist and lead singer for the band Research with Kenn Richards: They recorded the album The Post Modern Always Rings Twice with producer Dave Fridman of the Flaming Lips on Elektra Records which was never released. Other members included Suzanne Thorpe and Sean Thomas Mackowiak of the band Mercury Rev, and they released an EP called (Almost) Nothing Yet on Stickshift in 1998. Chamberlain also sang with a light-and-sound performance art group called The Infant Reader, also with David Abir.

=== Maxi Geil! and PlayColt, 2002 to present ===
She began working with Maxi Geil! & PlayColt in 2002, after being recruited by her now-husband Guy Richards Smit who heard from mutual friends she was looking for a new music project. The lead singer's name translating to "super horny" in German, Maxi Geil! & PlayColt is a band centered around a fictional New Wave pop star played by Smit based on '70s and '80s Dutch rock star Herman Brood. Its music is a variety of pop that blends influences from Bryan Ferry, Roxy Music, and David Bowie from his Ziggy Stardust era.

In addition to Smit on lead vocals, the band includes Chamberlain, also on vocals, John Allen on lead guitar, and Mark Ephraim on rhythm guitar as well as a rotating cast of others including now-TV actress Zoe Lister-Jones, as well as Smit's Dutch half-brother Tijn Smit. With songs like "I Will Leave You First" and "Making Love in the Sunshine," the group's music has been described as "anti-sentimental." In "Making Love in the Sunshine," for example, the band "request[s] your presence in the bathroom / When the music stops," and in "The Artist's Lament," Maxi croons "I want your vagina around the head of my prick." The band has played a number of times in New York City and London, and released two albums, A Message to mMy Audience, their first full-length effort in 2004, and Strange Sensation in 2007.

== Performative and other work ==
=== Nausea 2 ===
Chamberlain starred with Smit in the most ambitious in the Maxi Geil! video series, an hour-long rock musical that debuted at MoMA during its fall 2004 reopening. They played porn stars Giselle Thurst and Maxi Geil! who have reached crossroads in their careers. (A second plot involves a young amateur porn star, Annie Ball, played by Zoe Lister-Jones.) The cast also includes a bevy of other Brooklynites, including Christian Viveros-Fauné, art critic and Smit's then-gallerist as a member of the Spanish press, and film actor Leo Fitzpatrick as a porn actor. When Maxi and Giselle finally meet, after the former dramatically resigns from his career, they set out to find themselves. In the end, however, they only end up shopping, Smit's attack on the notions of self-exploration in the work of his contemporaries. The work features, among others, the song "The Love I Lose," the first part sung by Giselle after she is fired from one job and runs errands in Culver City, the second by Maxi in his dressing room before his resignation press conference.

A writer for The Washington Post describes Nausea 2 as "appealingly complex." He continues, "It's as though Smit takes the premise of a mockumentary such as This Is Spinal Tap, then gives it the density and even subtle conherence of good contemporary art." Art critic John Haber wrote that he found the work "hilarious," declaring it both "less pretentious" and "more coherent" than a Matthew Barney epic cycle.

Maxi Geil! & PlayColt also played at the MoMA reopening event.

=== Fashion design consulting ===
Having received her apparel training at RISD, Chamberlain currently works as a fashion design consultant. In the '90s she worked for Gap and Old Navy. Her clients include Coach, Gary Graham, Uniqlo, Gap, and sweaters for Rebecca Taylor and Lou & Grey. She is friends with Marcia Patmos of Lutz & Patmos and M. Patmos, for whom she has also designed.

== Awards ==
- NYFA Fellowship in Painting, 2012

== Personal life and family ==
She is the daughter of Mary Leslie Jordan and Peter Aims Chamberlain. Her sister, Martha, is a costume designer and dancewear designer for her own Philadelphia-based label Chamberlain Goods. Martha is also a former principal ballerina for the Pennsylvania Ballet.

Chamberlain married Guy Richards Smit, a visual performance artist and singer-songwriter in Max Geil! & PlayColt, on August 23, 2003. They have two sons.

== Collections ==
Egon Zender, Currier Museum of Art, Fidelity Investments, and Torys LLP
