= Stephen Maine =

American painter and critic

- Born: 1958 (age 67–68); Hartford, Connecticut, US
- Education: Vermont College of Fine Arts; Indiana University Bloomington
- Known for: Abstract painting
- Spouse: Gelah Penn
- Awards: New York Foundation for the Arts, Yaddo
- Website: Stephen Maine

Stephen Maine, P17-0301, "Residue Paintings" series, acrylic on canvas, 50" x 40", 2017.

Stephen Maine (born 1958) is an American painter, critic and curator. As an artist, he is known for abstract paintings that he produces by low-tech, mechanical means, applying paint to canvas and paper with intermediary surfaces used like printing plates (e.g., the "Residue paintings" series). The paintings are notable for their conceptual implications with regard to core art tenets such as personal expression, intention and representation, with critics highlighting their reference to—and simultaneous divergence from—art-historical works and movements that employed impersonal methods of art making. Brooklyn Rail critic Tom McGlynn wrote, "Maine makes a restrained but compelling case for gestural abstraction's residual ability to touch a nerve," with "non-decisional" works grounded in "a playful suspension of the often-fraught debate between the dogmatically formal and the informality of associative illusion."

Maine's art belongs to the collections of the Metropolitan Museum of Art, The Phillips Collection, Cleveland Museum of Art, and U.S. Department of State, among others. He has exhibited at The Drawing Center, Herbert F. Johnson Museum of Art, Kentler International Drawing Space, Deutscher Künstlerbund Projektraum and Riverside Art Museum, among other venues. His writing has appeared in art publications including Artcritical, Art in America, ARTnews, Hyperallergic and The New York Sun. Maine lives and works in northwest Connecticut and New York City and is married to artist Gelah Penn.

== Life and career ==
Maine was born in Hartford, Connecticut in 1958. He studied art at the University of Connecticut and Yale Summer School of Music and Art before graduating with a BFA in painting from Indiana University Bloomington in 1982. In 2014, he completed an MFA in visual art at Vermont College of Fine Arts.

Maine has exhibited in solo shows at the 490 Atlantic, National Arts Club, Hionas Gallery, Silas von Morisse Gallery and Private Public Gallery in New York, Pazo Fine Art in Washington DC, and Five Points Gallery and Icehouse Project Space in Connecticut, among others. He has appeared in surveys including: "Splendor of Dynamic Structure" (Johnson Museum of Art, 2011); "Textility" (Visual Arts Center of New Jersey, 2012); "Dynamic Invention: American Abstract Artists at 75" (Brattleboro Museum and Art Center, 2013); and "The Onward of Art" (2016).

Maine has contributed critical articles and reviews to art publications since 2003. He taught at the School of Visual Arts in New York from 2006 to 2016, SUNY Purchase from 2017 to 2024, and for shorter periods at Parsons/The New School and Hartford Art School.

== Work and reception ==
Maine's artworks are abstract, featuring edge-to-edge fields of irregular forms and optical effects deriving from color and layering. They result from an unconventional painting technique that figures prominently in the artist's work and its critical reception. Whereas paint is typically applied by hand using a brush or palette knife, Maine applies it with makeshift stamps created by him from a variety of materials that have included carpeting, mesh, rope and distressed polystyrene foam. The process produces crude reproductions subject to incidental effects and is akin to relief printmaking. Commentators have asserted that by eliminating hand-controlled gesture from the painting process, Maine effectively subordinates personal expression to elements that are non-decisional, non-expressive and arbitrary. He retains formal elements of artistic control, however, such as color palette and saturation, paint viscosity, and the pressure and repetition of paint impressions.

The process and resulting artwork raise philosophical questions about intentionality, representation, order and entropy, particularly where they intersect with recent art-historical figures and movements. With regard to intentionality, critics liken his approach to the impersonal, "hands-off" methods used in Gerhard Richter's abstractions, minimalism, and the industrial paintings of Andy Warhol. In visual terms, however, Maine's work is more aligned with the abstract, all-over style of Jackson Pollock, whose expressionism contrasts sharply with impersonality. Similarly, some of Maine's work recalls the dot matrices of pop art but are entirely devoid of the representational subjects that are a defining quality of those works. Critics have noted that the juxtaposition of divergent art references is a hallmark of Maine's oeuvre.

Maine's process-driven works also bring into play contrasting ideas about originality, facsimile and seriality. In part, this is due to his use of a repeated, mechanical operation to produce unique canvasses, which inverts the conventional relationship of printmaking to painting. Typically, works created by printmaking and mechanical processes are mass produced and considered inferior to paintings, which are generally unique and "handmade." Critics note that Maine's use of the same printing plate on multiple paintings within a series adds an additional layer of complexity by blurring distinctions between unique, serial and reproduced works. This observation can be made when his paintings are hung side by side, revealing common surface motifs across outwardly dissimilar, divergently colored works.

Stephen Maine, P13-0909, "Halftone Paintings" series, acrylic on canvas, 40" x 40", 2013.

=== Painting and other series (late 1990s–2014) ===
Maine mixed unconventional methods, humor and the influences of synthetic Cubism and Op art in early series that explored pattern, perception and the interplay of pictorial and sculptural space. The "Snapline" drawings (late 1990s) and Pitched Planes works (2001–9) were created with textured industrial materials rolled with paint; in the latter series, each shape was made from a different surface, placing emphasis on the legibility of distinct patterns, the optical blending of hues and the illusion of depth. Works such as Mesh painting #11–011 (2011) approached assemblage art, employing patterned fabrics pinned to walls in overlapping, grid-like arrangements instead of stretchers and paint.

In the "Smoke Pictures" and "Halftone Paintings" (2009-14), Maine reconsidered tropes involving painting, mechanical reproduction and the printed image explored by pop art. The paintings consisted of layered fields of crude, abstract dot matrices of various hues and tints that Maine created by stamping paint onto canvas with materials such as carpeting. The resulting images mimicked the look of imperfectly printed halftone photographs, but centered on plays between figure and ground, surface and depth, and allusion rather than overt subject matter (e.g., P13-0909, 2013). Critic David Brody described them as "evoking Roy Lichtenstein's and Sigmar Polke's antipodal versions of Pop while dissolving those associations in an acid bath … of non-composition."

According to William Corwin, key nuances of those series derived from Maine's simulation of halftone imagery, which evoked in viewers a sense of familiarity, as well as concepts of the facsimile and veracity to a point of reference. These notions were confounded by Maine’s process—which was enigmatic and not reproducible—and the images themselves, whose cloud-like or cartographic patterns, Corwin wrote, "insist on some unknown algorithm of order" implicit in the idea of mechanical reproduction yet "seem like casual studies of entropy."

=== "Residue Paintings" (2014–present) ===
Stephen Maine, P24-0810, acrylic on canvas, 60" x 48", 2024.

Since 2014, Maine's work has centered on the "Residue Paintings"—enveloping canvasses (some over 8' tall) of complex, all-over-style configurations of irregular drips, blobs and puddles. For these works, Maine built a hinged construction that holds a large, flat plate made of plywood and polystyrene gouged and incised with fields of marks. After applying a baseline layer of paint, he coats the plate in another color and stamps the entire canvas by pushing down or walking on the back of the plate, often making successive rounds of impressions using oppositional colors. The process is intentionally imprecise, producing varied and unexpected effects. Irregularities in coverage, pressure and alignment yield blends or transparent overlays of color, puckered and craquelure-patterned surfaces, and perceptual effects in which forms seem to hover, appear in relief or take on three-dimensionality (e.g., P17-0301, 2017).

Critics suggest that, like the work of Jackson Pollock, these paintings function less as images than as skins or traces of a process that remains unclear in terms of origin or symbolic logic. They have been likened to "found abstractions," drawing visual comparisons to natural and biomorphic phenomena (cave interiors, landslides, corals), chemical reactions or surfaces eroded by acid or rust, and medical imaging. Noting the human tendency to seek understanding and generate associative and figurative allusions out of abstract patterns and colors, Patrick Neal wrote, Maine's "work is charged with a formal and conceptual energy that compels us to consider the embedded process that occurs behind the scenes."

Reviews of Maine's 2022 and 2024 shows noted a simpler, more graphic clarity in the high-contrast forms and evenly painted grounds of his smaller-scale residue paintings (e.g., 7826P24-0810, 2024). John Mendelsohn wrote, "a new feeling of organic growth emerges in the branching, linear patterns that structure some of the works. At times, these rib-like elements vibrate in pixilated, buzzing topographies, or alternately devolve into runic entanglements."

In 2018, Maine created his first site-specific work, the 10'-by-45' painting, Fire and Ice, at Icehouse Project Space. The painting wrapped the space in a pattern of bright yellow splotches and organic shapes over blue that referenced a nearby pond. The exhibition concluded with a Dadaist performance in which Maine divvied up sections of the painting selected by stretcher bar-bearing visitors to take for free. It was inspired by the site's former life as a storage space where ice was cut into blocks for trade.

== Writing and curating ==
Maine is a contributing editor at Artcritical and member of the International Association of Art Critics (AICA). Since 2003, he has written features and reviews for Artillery, Art in America, Artnet, ARTnews, Art on Paper, The Brooklyn Rail, Hyperallergic and The New York Sun, among others. He has also written catalogue essays for solo artist and group exhibitions, including his own curatorial projects.

Maine has curated exhibitions including: "The Photograph as Canvas" (Aldrich Contemporary Art Museum, 2007); "Wall Works" (The Painting Center, 2011); "Diphthong" (Fiterman Art Center, 2015, with Gelah Penn); and "Artists Quarantine With Their Art Collections" (Muhlenberg College, 2021–22). The latter show began as a series of articles Maine organized for Hyperallergic during the COVID-19 pandemic, which examined the ways a global cataclysm might reshape the meanings of artworks predating the experience.

== Collections and recognition ==
Maine's work belongs to the public collections of the Cleveland Museum of Art, Metropolitan Museum of Art, Museum of Modern Art, New York Public Library, The Phillips Collection, U.S. Department of State, Vanderbilt University Fine Arts Gallery and Yale University Art Gallery, among others. He has been awarded a New York Foundation for the Arts fellowship (2000) and a residency at Yaddo (2012). He is a member of American Abstract Artists.
