= Elisabeth Subrin =

- Born: 1965 (age 60–61); Boston, Massachusetts, U.S.
- Education: Massachusetts College of Art 1990, B.F.A. School of the Art Institute of Chicago 1995, M.F.A.
- Occupations: Artist, film director, professor, screenwriter
- Honours: 2001 Creative Capital Foundation Fellowship, 2002 Guggenheim Fellow, 2003 Sundance Institute Fellowship, 2004 Rockefeller Foundation's Media Arts Fellowship, 2006 Annenberg Foundation and Sundance Institute Fellowship, 2017 MacDowell Fellow, 2023 César for Best Documentary Short, 2026 Bill Douglas Award for International Short

Elisabeth Subrin is a Brooklyn-based filmmaker, screenwriter, and visual artist. She is known for her interdisciplinary practice in the contemporary art and independent film worlds. Recognized for her cinematic use of reenactment, her films and video installations have been featured in numerous festivals and exhibitions internationally, including solo shows at The Museum of Modern Art, Film at Lincoln Center, STUK arts center in Belgium, and the Vienna Viennale. Her recent research has focused on the late French actress Maria Schneider. She is a professor in Temple University's Department of Film and Media Arts. In 2020, she was a Fulbright Research Scholar in France. Her 2022 short film, Maria Schneider, 1983, starring Manal Issa, Aïssa Maïga and Isabel Sandoval, had its world premiere at the 2022 Cannes Film Festival in Director’s Fortnight and North American premiere at The 2022 New York Film Festival and won Best Documentary Short Film at the 48th César Awards. Subrin’s 2016 award-winning feature narrative, A Woman, a Part, starring Maggie Siff, Cara Seymour, John Ortiz, and Khandi Alexander, had its world premiere in competition at International Film Festival Rotterdam and traveled to festivals throughout Europe, US and Asia. It was released theatrically in 2017. A commissioned multi-channel video, sound and sculptural version, The Listening Takes, was on view at David Winton Bell Gallery through June 4th, 2023, and then in expanded versions at Participant Inc and in her 2026 survey, Elisabeth Subrin: How We Find Her at STUK in Belgium.

== Biography ==
Subrin grew up in Boston, Massachusetts. She received her M.F.A. from The School of the Art Institute of Chicago in 1995. In 2001 she received the Creative Capital Award in the discipline of Moving Image. In 2003 she was selected for the Sundance Institute's Feature Film Directing and Screenwriting Labs with her first feature screenplay, "Up". In 2010, Sue Scott Gallery in New York mounted a retrospective of her work, Elisabeth Subrin: Her Compulsion To Repeat. It included her 2010 video installation Lost Tribes and Promised Lands, her 2008 two-channel film projection Sweet Ruin, as well as selected experimental films, videos, and large-scale photographic stills from 1990-2010. Parts of the exhibition traveled to MoMA/PS1’s Greater New York, The Mattress Factory, Musée d'Art Contemporain du Val-de-Marne, The Haggerty Museum, Milwaukee, and in solo exhibitions at The Jewish Museum, and VOLTA, New York. In 2012 and 2022, her film Shulie was included in the British Film Institute Sight&Sound once-a-decade international critics’ poll for “The Greatest Films of All Times.” Richard Brody covered her 2015 solo show at Film Society of Lincoln Center for The New Yorker, writing of Shulie: “Subrin’s concepts are ingenious and her experiment results in a major advance in the field. Her ideas are beautiful, and the movie is a thing of wonder.”

In 2016 Subrin premiered her first feature film, A Woman, a Part, at the International Film Festival Rotterdam in the Tiger Awards competition before presenting it in festivals worldwide. Starring Maggie Siff, Cara Seymour, John Ortiz and Khandi Alexander, it was acquired by Strand Releasing for distribution and theatrically released in 2017. Currently, The Criterion Channel is presenting several of her short films and video art.

Her short film, Maria Schneider, 1983 had its world premiere at the 2022 Cannes Film Festival in Director’s Fortnight and North American premiere at The 2022 New York Film Festival and won Best Documentary Short Film at the 48th César Awards. A multi-channel video, sound and sculptural version, The Listening Takes, was on view at David Winton Bell Gallery through June 4th, 2023. In 2026 Subrin had a solo exhibition “How We Find Her” at STUK, Belgium, which was a large scale presentation of four video installations from 2008-2026, plus drawings and collages.

== Film and video work ==
Swallow (1995) "Swallow" is an experimental video exploring early adolescence and eating disorders. Tina Wasserman wrote in The New Art Examiner (1996) that, "For Subrin, as the visual metaphor of silence or speechlessness---evidenced primarily by the repeated use of white-out on the body, text, and image---gains prominence in Swallow, it becomes clear that the fragility of female identity in post-feminist America appears, in part, as the failure of language itself."

Shulie (1997) Subrin's best known work was inspired by her rediscovery of a little-seen documentary profiling Shulamith Firestone in her final year as a B.F.A. student at School of the Art Institute of Chicago. The original 1967 film was part of a larger series made by four male graduate students at Northwestern University and documents Firestone three years before she published The Dialectic of Sex: The Case for Feminist Revolution and became recognized as a key figure in the development of radical feminism. Filmed on Super-8 and transferred to video and back to 16mm, Subrin's piece is a shot-by-shot remake of the 1967 documentary with Kim Soss playing Firestone. On the occasion of her 2015 solo show at Lincoln Center's "Art of the Real" series, Richard Brody wrote in The New Yorker about the film, praising its ingenuity of form.

Kate Haug wrote in a review of the film, "Given the late ‘80s art world trends of appropriation and the ever-growing experience of simulacrum, it is not so shocking that an innovative filmmaker would take on celluloid cloning" and continued to state that "by creating a replica film of the ‘60s she [Subrin] harnesses the remake's amorphous quality of time to deftly address contemporary politics." This film forces its viewers to reconnect to and become re-aware of the historical context – the individual and radical origins of U.S. feminism's Second Wave and how that course of events was subsumed and re-defined by the ensuing conservative political culture of the ‘80s. Haug continues, "The temporal gap between 1967 and 1997 grants the audience a chance to re-think the future of feminism. By not completing or adding to Firestone's biography, Subrin intentionally leaves the history of feminism incomplete – instead of following Firestone as she matures, Shulie (1967 and 1997) stops before feminism takes off."

B. Ruby Rich, author of the book Chick Flicks noted, "She has created a document within a document that makes us remember what we didn’t know, [and] makes us realize all over again how much we’ve lost."

The Fancy (2000) The Fancy, is an experimental biography exploring the life, death, and legacy of the late photographer Francesca Woodman, who committed suicide at age 22. The film explores the young artist's lasting legacy by meditating on her absence. A.O.Scott, "Video Art in a World on Tape," The New York Times.

The Caretakers (2006) A commission for The MacDowell Colony's Centennial Celebration, "The Caretakers" traces the unraveling of a writer as she begins a residency at the artist colony, haunted by the aura of former artists who worked there. Featuring Cara Seymour (Adaptation, Dancer in the Dark, American Psycho), with an original score by video/performance artist Wynne Greenwood (Tracy and the Plastics).

Sweet Ruin (2008) "Sweet Ruin" is an experimental adaptation starring Gaby Hoffmann of Michelangelo Antonioni's script, Technically Sweet, written in the late '60s, but never produced. Set in the Amazon and Sardinia, Technically Sweet was to star Jack Nicholson as T., a disillusioned journalist obsessed with guns, and Maria Schneider as "The Girl."

Lost Tribes and Promised Lands (2010) A split screen projection created in response to the after-effects of the 9/11 attacks. Shot on 16mm, the footage documents memorials set up around Subrin's neighborhood immediately following the attacks, and revisits the same locations eight years later. Nick Stillman, Artforum 2010. Following the installation, Subrin was featured on The New York Times homepage in an interview about the work.

A Woman, a Part (2016) A full-length feature film, written and directed by Subrin, starring Maggie Siff, Cara Seymour, and John Ortiz. Jeanette Catsoulis wrote for The New York Times "Unresolved feelings and unsatisfied ambitions animate A Woman, a Part, Elisabeth Subrin’s sophisticated take on female friendship and professional frustration... Touching on issues of artistic survival and the porous boundary between work and pleasure, Ms. Subrin, an accomplished visual artist and filmmaker, sifts addiction, celebrity and the plight of the aging actress into something rarefied yet real. A strong, intelligent screen presence, Ms. Siff can make the simplest line feel pregnant with possibility. And Ms. Seymour is the perfect counterpoint, giving Kate a warm vulnerability that’s never overplayed or milked for sentiment."

30/30 Vision: 3 Decades of Strand Releasing (segment "For Maria") (2019)

Maria Schneider, 1983 (2022) Actresses (and directors) Manal Issa, Aïssa Maïga, and Isabel Sandoval recreate a 1983 French TV interview with French actress Maria Schneider, which takes a turn when she’s asked about the traumatic filming of Last Tango in Paris with Bernardo Bertolucci and Marlon Brando a decade before. Tony Pipolo wrote for Artforum “Subrin has made a provocative, unnerving document, difficult to forget.” The film had its world premiere at the 2022 Cannes Film Festival in Director’s Fortnight and North American premiere at The 2022 New York Film Festival and won Best Documentary Short Film at the 48th César Awards.

Manal Issa, 2024 (2025) Manal Issa appeared in 2022 as French actress Maria Schneider in Maria Schneider, 1983 by Elisabeth Subrin. In 2024, Issa answers the same questions, this time posed to her personally by Elisabeth Subrin. Issa has taken the decision to stop acting until there is a ceasefire in Gaza. She does not appear on camera in this film either. It was filmed with a static camera on 22 September 2024, just hours before the Israeli army intensified its bombing of Lebanon. The film had its world premiere at Doc Fortnight and international premiere at Cinéma du Réel. “...this pendant work thrums with tension and political urgency as the artists react to the devastating crisis of the Middle East and to the experience of being silenced.” The film won the Bill E Douglas award at the 2026 Glasgow Short Film Festival.

== Exhibitions and Installations ==
Elisabeth Subrin: Her Compulsion To Repeat (2010) at the Sue Scott Gallery, New York.

Shulie: A Film and Stills (2010) at The Jewish Museum, New York. “By remaking an obscure documentary about radical ‘60s activist Shulamith Firestone, artist Elisabeth Subrin offers a nostalgic and somewhat cynical reflection on the legacy of second-wave feminism.”

Elisabeth Subrin, Shulie: A Film and Stills (2011), VOLTA NY.

Elisabeth Subrin: Lost Tribes and Promised Lands (2013) at Vox Populi, Philadelphia. The exhibition “examines Subrin’s own past by revisiting documentary footage she filmed soon after the 2001 attacks on the WTC, when her working class Italian neighborhood was dramatically transformed with patriotic fervor. Seven years later, before the 2008 elections, she attempted to retrace her steps, now only half-remembered, and matched the original footage with a poignant recreation. The resulting two-channel projection and photographs becomes an analogy for a fraught American decade through the subtle political and economic shifts of one gentrifying neighborhood.”

Elisabeth Subrin: Damage Report (2014) at the Institute of Contemporary Art, Philadelphia. “Intrigued by the language ICA’s registrars have used to record the condition of objects as they enter and leave the museum (“damage reports”), filmmaker Elisabeth Subrin recasts these handwritten documents as an ethereal presence in the gallery.”

Elisabeth Subrin: The Listening Takes (2023) at the David Winton Bell Gallery. The Listening Takes is an immersive sound, video and sculptural installation that presents three portraits of the French actress Maria Schneider. Jessica Shearer wrote for Hyperallergic “Throughout her career, Subrin has expressed a longstanding preoccupation with the way actresses serve as archetypes for how women move through the world; conveying both desires and fears, they simulate circumstances through which audiences can project fantasies or safely confront or heal from personal experiences. In The Listening Takes, we observe the relationship between the observed and the observer in real time; as one Maria talks, the others seem to listen, and when Sandoval concludes, they all begin again together. Viewers keeping an eye on Sandoval throughout this final loop will be rewarded. The most modern iteration, she is gifted with the agency we wish Schneider had in 1983. Condemning the scene for what it was — rape — she walks off the set into a life made lighter by that admission.”

The Listening Takes/Manal Issa, 2024 (V2) (2024-2025), a site-specific, multi-channel video, sound and sculptural installation at Participant, Inc, New York. Filmmaker Magazine said "While shooting Maria Schneider, 1983, Subrin captured additional footage for a companion work that adapts the work’s concerns to the gallery space while allowing a whole new set of meanings to emerge. In The Listening Takes, currently running through February 2 at New York’s PARTICIPANT INC gallery, the three actresses are each given their own hanging video screen, and viewers cross in front, walk behind and amble between them, shifting attention to view the actresses singly or all together. The effect is entirely different as the viewer experiences the actresses all at once, receiving not just their words but the force of their attention as they “listen” to each other’s testimonies before their voices all converge to reach a final choral conclusion. (For the viewer, it’s a journey aided by the masterful sound design, in which the voices naturally fade in and out, repositioning themselves as the viewer moves within the work’s soundscape.)"

Elisabeth Subrin: How We Find Her (2026) Solo exhibition at STUK House for Dance, Image, and Sound, Leuven Belgium. "All in all, How We Find Her is a testimony to Subrin’s long-standing deployment and deconstruction of biographical forms to expose the limitations of the quest for an ‘official record’, and the absences and erasures it often produces. It is equally an invitation to question what positions we can take with our voices today - whether addressing genocide, sexual assault or other injustice - and reckoning with the consequences of speaking up."

Video Installation at Mumok, Museum of Modern Art, Vienna, Austria (2026-2027) A commissioned large-scale installation of Subrin’s film Swallow in Terminal Piece, a group exhibition. "Act II changes the air with Swallow (1995), a video work by Elisabeth Subrin that anchors the shift. The film holds two temporalities that refuse to align: the collective optimism of political movements in the 1960s and ’70s, and the private collapse of a single life moving through depression, illness, and eating disorders. One, you are 19 years old. You can’t read anymore. The work lets the contradiction sit, uncomfortably, as if the promise of progress had always already contained its own exhaustion. Television appears here not as a background but as a pressure, an image system that produces both identification and distance. What is shown is never only what is there. It is also what is expected to be seen."

== Awards ==
2001 Creative Capital Foundation Fellowship

2001 Yaddo Fellow

2002 The Guggenheim Fellowship

2003 The Sundance Institute Fellowship

2004 The Rockefeller Foundation's Media Arts Fellowship

2006 The Annenberg Foundation and Sundance Institute Fellowship

2002, 2003, 2007, 2011, 2014, 2017 MacDowell Fellow

2018 Distinguished Alumni Award, Massachusetts College of Art

2020 Fulbright Research Scholar, France

2023 César for Best Documentary Short, Académie des César, France

2026 The Bill Douglas Award for International Short, Glasgow Short Film Festival, Scotland

== Lectures and academic career ==
Subrin has taught at Harvard University, Yale University School of Art, Cooper Union, Amherst College, Bennington College, and The School of the Art Institute of Chicago. She is currently a Professor in the Film and Media Arts Department at Temple University and lives in Brooklyn, New York.

She has led panel discussions with feminist icons such as filmmaker, Agnès Varda, legal scholar and activist, Anita Hill and fellow feminist artists such as K8 Hardy and Johanna Fateman.

== Other work ==
Subrin has worked in collaboration with many artists and producers, such as on Crisis in Woodlawn (1994). Other projects include The Judy Spots (1995) five television spots produced with Sadie Benning for MTV, and The File Room (1994), an interactive electronic archives produced by Antonio Muntadas. In 2002 she directed the music video well, well, well for New York-based feminist electronic band Le Tigre and worked as a creative consultant and videographer for the historical documentary Slumming It: Myth and Culture on the Bowery (2002), directed by Scott Elliott. Subrin directed Sarah Jones's video for the 2017 Women's March.

She is an associate producer on David Shapiro's 2015 documentary "Missing People," and the creator and editor of the feminist blog, "Who Cares About Actresses". Speaking on Who Cares About Actresses in 2017, Subrin said "In 2014, I began a blog, called Who Cares About Actresses, because of the questions I repeatedly received when trying to finance this film. Questions that clearly were not asked about a similarly plotted film about a male actor who escapes Hollywood for New York and tries to reinvent himself, i.e. Birdman. Even Maggie Siff, who stars in the film, was skeptical of an audience’s interest in the work she’s devoted her life to. Starting with Maggie, I’ve tried to explain, over and over, that actresses matter profoundly. The roles they play, transmitted by global corporate entities designed solely to make money, tell girls how to be, or, in most cases, how to perform. And they tell boys how to treat women. These children become the adults who shape the world. It doesn’t take Feminism 101 to point to the implications for the world we live in because of the limitations imposed on female representations."
