= Jason Middlebrook =

Jason Middlebrook may refer to:

- Jason Middlebrook (baseball)
- Jason Middlebrook (artist)
