= Pont Aven School of Contemporary Art =

Former art school in Pont Aven, France

Coordinates: 47.8553°N 3.7479°W

The Pont Aven School of Contemporary Art (PASCA) was an art school in Pont Aven, France, founded in 1993 by the art historian Caroline Boyle-Turner as an international fine arts program for advanced under-graduate and post-graduate studies. It was a private, United States non-profit university fully accredited for undergraduate study programs in the summer and semesters through its affiliation with Rhode Island School of Design and Pacific Northwest College of Art in Portland, Oregon. In 2011, the school closed its doors.

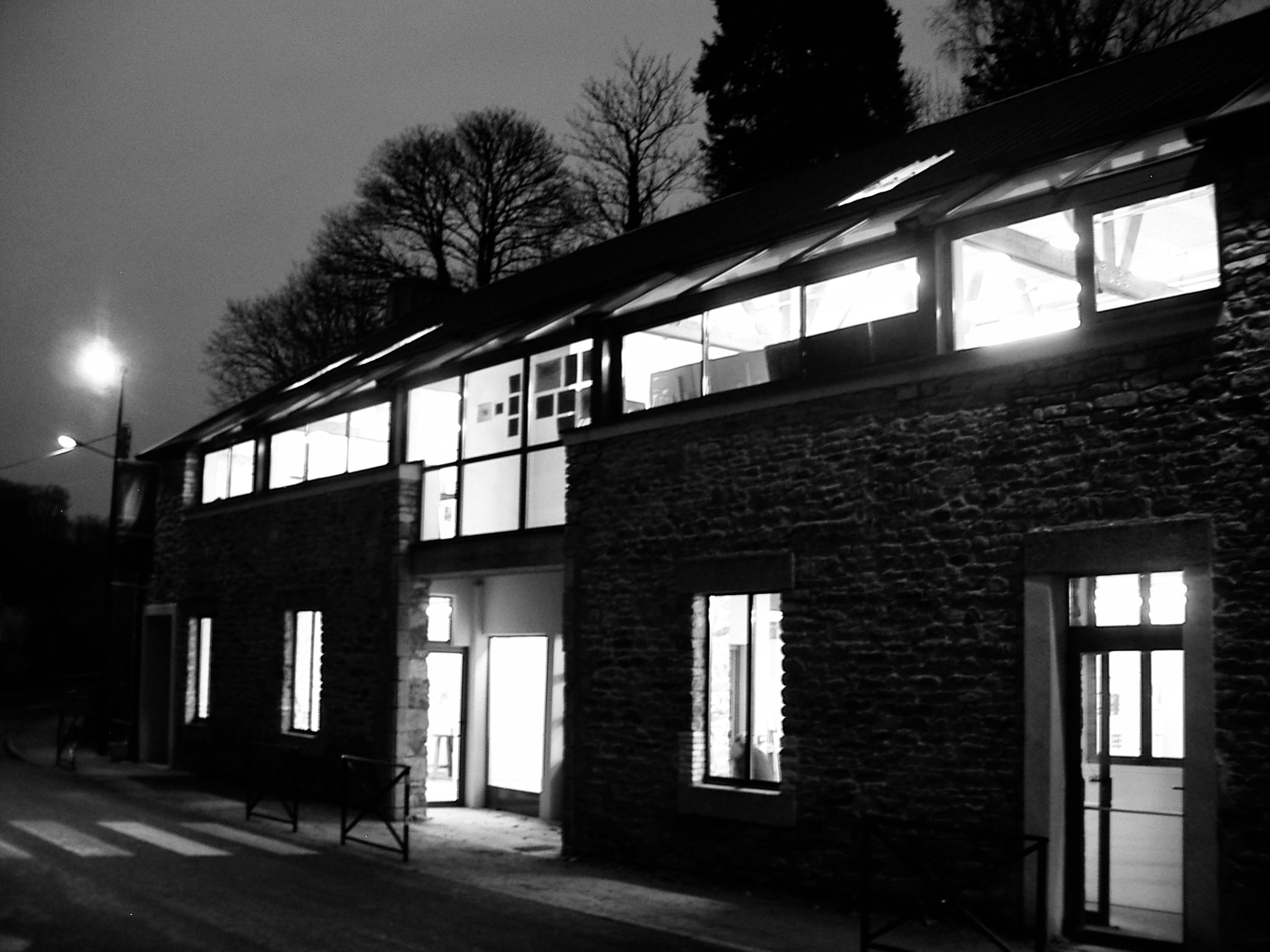
Black and white night view of Pont Aven School of Contemporary Art school building in Pont Aven France

Junior year, undergraduate coursework delivered during the 15-week/15-credit study abroad semester at PASCA was accredited through Pacific Northwest College of Art in Portland, Oregon. Courses satisfied National Association of Schools of Art and Design requirements for 300 level studio, art history/critical studies and French culture and language classes.

Each term the curriculum had these potential course options:

• A 2-D studio (can include painting, drawing, print) • A 3-D studio (can include sculpture, installation, site work) • A 4-D studio (time-based strategies that may include video, performance, photo, digital) • An Art History/Critical Studies offering • French Culture and Language study • Two five-day faculty-led cultural site seminars, to Paris/Berlin and either Venice in Biennale years, or Madrid/Barcelona, or London ].

A shorter summer session was available as well. The campus included studios, exhibition spaces, IT labs, and libraries. Students visited the contemporary art scenes of Paris, London and Berlin.

The art school was located in the small town of Pont-Aven in Brittany, France – since the 19th century one of the favorite summer working places of Paris-based artists and art students like Paul Gauguin, Paul Sérusier, Émile Bernard, as well as Maurice de Vlaminck and Camille Claudel. Since these heroic days, Pont-Aven School became a brand covering a broad variety of artists busy in the region.

In partnership with CIAC-Pont Aven, the school hosted and sponsored a wide range of contemporary art exhibits, solo, duo, and group exhibitions by an international cohort of professional artists. During the school's history, 132 faculty taught art history, studio art, and more. This is not a complete list, Ann Albritton, Bob Alderette, William Anastasi, Mikki Ansin, Olive Ayhens, Derek Bacchus, Ray Beldner, Barbara Bernstein, Leo Bersamina, Danielle Blin-Daniel, Leslie Bostrom, Caroline Boyle-Turner, Dove Bradshaw, Susan Brearey, Harvey Breverman, Pegan Brooke, Hedwig Brouckaert, Marilyn Brown, Donnamarie Bruton, Carine Charof, Hollis Clayson, Dawn Clements, Dennis Congdon, Jay Coogan, E.G. Crichton, Cynthia Crosby, Nan Curtis, Nancy Dasenbrock, Stuart Diamond, Kenneth Dingwall, Susan Doyle, Laurence Dreiband, Dana Duff, David Eckard, Wendy Edwards, Dahlia Elsayed, Dale Emmart, Julie Evans, Melissa Ferreira, Mike Fink, William Flynn, Megan Foster, Tom Francis, Peter Frank, Chris Gander, Jeffrey Gibson, Marcin Gizycki, Barbara Grad, Nana Gregory, Nade Haley, Michael Hall, Siegfried Halus, Mary Hambleton, Daniel Heyman, Robin Hill, Kirsten Hoving, Holly Hughes, Marc Jacobson, Carl Johnson, Roy Johnston, Clint Jukkala, Claire Kerrisel, Sharon Kivland, John Klein, William Kofmehl III, Victor Kord, Naomie Kremer, Winifred Lambrecht, Julie Langsam, Horatio Law, Ellen Lee, Fabienne Le Gall, Susan Lichtman, David Lloyd, Kathleen Loe, Pam Longobardi, Amy Lovera, Nancy Macko, George Magalios, Marlene Malik, Pam Marks, Barbara McBane, Ann McCoy, Bryan McFarlane, Jerry Mischak, David Morrison, Richard Nickolson, Andrew Nixon, David Oates, Maureen O'Brien, Rune Olsen, Paul Paiement, Sejal Patel, Bryan Panks, Hearne Pardee, Dushko Petrovich, Sally Pettibon, Pierre Picot, Lennie Pitkin, Lori Precious, Robin Quigley, Anne-Julie Raccoursier, Andrew Raftery, Robert Reed, Donald Schule, Tim Segar, Duane Slick, Joan Snitzer, Dean Snyder, Ann Sperry, Bruce Stiglich, Joanne Strykerz, Jay Stuckey, Agnieszka Taborska, Holly Tempo, Belinda Thomson, Sylvia Toux, Meg Turner, Sam Walsh, Arnold Weinstein, Ted Weller, Gina Werfel, Jo Whaley, Elizabeth Whalley, Barry Whittaker, Yvonne Williams, Susan Working, Al Wunderlich, Christy Wyckoff, Melanie Yazzie, and Muriam Zegrer.

Notable artists who exhibited with the school and CIAC include, Dawn Clements, Bruce Stiglich, Wendy Edwards, Melissa Ferreira, Nana Gregory, Sam Walsh, David Eckard, John K Melvin and his Aven Project, Gilles Mahé, Nancy Macko, Fred of the Wood, Dagmar Hemmerich, Cristina de Melo, Milena Martinovic, Nik Vlahos, Robin Hill, and many more artists spanning 18 years of operation,

Eighteen years of over 800 enrolled students produced end-of-semester group art exhibitions, where between 10 and 20 students per semester showed work, every 5 to 15 weeks of every year.

One of the last public events of the school was to host an exhibition-auction to benefit the Association of France Alzheimer's, held at IZART Annexe in Pont-Aven. The exhibition was open to the public from August 30, 2024 until September 7, 2024, and was documented in numerous articles
