= Guy Richards Smit =

American painter

- Born: 1970 (age 55–56)
- Occupations: Performance artist, painter, singer-songwriter

Guy Richards Smit (born 1970) is an American performance artist, painter, and singer-songwriter in the band Maxi Geil! & PlayColt. He has shown at the Museum of Modern Art in New York City, also in London, Los Angeles, Madrid, Valencia, Paris, Dublin, and Havana, among other places. He is represented by Charlie James Gallery in Los Angeles.

== Background and family ==
His Dutch father, J. W. Smit, was a Dutch language and literature professor at Columbia University and an expert on French composer Hector Berlioz. His Dutch-American mother, Pamela Richards, was a professor of library history. (She died in 1999, and his father in 2006.) Smit's sister, Marijke, is an urban planner who works with a green architectural firm in the Bay Area. His two older half-brothers (from his father's first marriage) are both in creative fields in the Netherlands: One, Tijn Smit, played keyboard on the Playcolt song, "Here Comes Maxi."

Smit's great-great-great grandfather on his mother's side was Gulian Verplanck, who represented New York state in the United States Congress from 1825 to 1833 and later ran for mayor of New York City in the city's first open mayoral election. His maternal grandmother was a Billy Rose dancer.

== Education ==
As a Manhattan teen, Smit was in a number of Alternative rock bands. He studied abroad for a year at the Rietveld Academie in Amsterdam as an undergraduate at Parsons, and lived for a year in Berlin. He then entered the Master of Fine Arts program at Rutgers where he learned of the work of New York performance artist Michael Smith. He described to Vice magazine encountering Smith's video, Go for It, Mike, that he felt it was "the saddest, most amazing celebration of averageness that's ever been made. I saw that and realized this is what I want to do." Smit graduated in 1996.

== Grossmalerman ==
=== First videos ===
The subject of an ongoing performance and video series that started in 1996—Smit has said that he moved into video after growing terrified of performing live—Jonathan Grossmalerman, whose last name is pig-German for "big painter guy," is a successful, alcoholic New York painter who has moved into low-end comedy. He has recorded an album, written a book, and delved into movie-making. (The latter is explained in Jonathan in Purgatory (1999) as a feature titled Sally which ends with David Salle dying during an operation for reconstructive plastic surgery.) Blake Gopnik the Washington Post has written that there are "hints of Andy Kaufman" in the work, saying, "Watch the videos with the sound turned off, and you'd sometimes swear you were watching real footage of someone with some kind of a career in comedy—no comic genius, maybe, but someone who's got the timing and manner down." In a performance shot in New York to look like Cologne, the character denounces Joseph Beuys, a national treasure in Germany. In another video, Jonathan Gets Clean (2000), the artist, in recovery, visits his Chelsea art dealer, played by real Chelsea art dealer John Post Lee who insists on paying his artists in cocaine then calls the police on him.

From 1999 to 2007 Smit was represented by Roebling Hall in New York City.

=== Comics ===
In 2008, Smit started to put Grossmalerman into comic book form, where he saw wider narrative possibility: Smit majored in illustration while at Parsons and has told ArtNews, "If you were to shoot [dismemberment], you’d have to do all kinds of angles. But in a comic, these types of exaggerated happenings can be worked into a story far more easily. It was a chance to develop this character even more." The second issue, published in 2011, featured Grossmalerman being kidnapped and stabbed in a group therapy session.

=== Sitcom-style series ===
The Grossmalerman comics in turn nudged the video work into sitcom form, with more actors, real world settings, and theme music; a line from the latter is "Don't greet the future on bended knees / Or go to Chelsea in faded jeans / Unless they're / From Japan." In an episode set in the Hamptons, a visiting art critic, played by writer-performer Kenny Mellman, Herb of Kiki and Herb, describes the painter's work is "Matisse-ish." Another is set in Grossmalerman's studio where he falls in love with his pill-popping model (Andrea Hendrickson). Episode 5, also set in the studio, involves male visitors (Mellman and the frontman of New York City's Les Savy Fav Tim Harrington, among others) taking turns hitting on the model. News is also shared of the painter's show in Moscow being held for random. Another episode had the troubled artist visited by Jean-Michel Basquiat's ghost who only relates some unhealthy career advice while Grossmalerman's model lies unconscious on a table in the background.

Smit paints all of the work attributed to his alter egos in all of his installations and videos. In "Studio Visit," for example, the characters spend time looking at a large painting in Alex Katz-like colors of the crotches of several people amusingly and impossibly tangled together.

=== Columns in ArtReview and Hyperallergic.com ===
In 2013, Grossmalerman started an opinion column in ArtReview. In one he complains about the criticism he received during his time on an art panel with Christian Viveros-Fauné playing himself. The next month, he announces that his interest in trading up in representation to Hauser & Wirth, comparing himself to oligarchic and banker-collectors.

Simultaneously in 2013, Grossmalerman wrote a column for the art and culture website Hyperallergic.com. The first was an explicit call for an intern: "If you need a shoulder to cry on, cry on mine.... Your twenties are a tough time and I’m happy to hold you and to stroke your luminous golden locks. I mean, if you’re into that. No pressure." Another tells a tale of being tasered and kidnapped at the Armory Show, and in another entry, he describes falling in love with his gallery's assistant, his fifth such experience.

=== Online series, 2015 ===
Smit and Mellman returned for a five-episode series all set at Grossmalerman's studio in Brooklyn, this time with Mellman co-starring as Grossmalerman's studio assistant, Neil. New York performance artist Jibz Cameron plays Joyce, the artist's girlfriend, Scissor Sisters' Ana Matronic and off-Broadway actress Jenn Harris as visiting art dealers, Louise and Regina of Windsor & Gristle. Funded by a Kickstarter campaign with artist and videomaker Joshua White directing in front of a live studio audience, the episodes start with news of Grossmalerman's wife having died at a party; the artist is left to care for their 11-year-old daughter, Tracy (Sadie Parker) and he is less than up to the task. Other plot lines include a haunted Basquiat painting, which produces lines like "Are you saying you choose to live a ghost just because of its social ranking?," Louise and Neil having an affair, the artist going through at least three iterations of work, and even further chaos. Carmine Covelli (ex-Julie Ruin member) and Brian Osborne also star.

The series was released to Kickstarter funders, and then from April 17 on YouTube. It was re-released on November 11 on PasteMagazine.com every Wednesday on the Grossmalerman site through December 12. Paste magazine noted the dual sitcom, art-world-targeting nature of the work, saying "its free-wheeling absurdity comes off a bit like that beloved classic The Young Ones," recalling the cult 1980s MTV classic.

== Maxi Geil! ==
His name translating to "really horny" in German, Maxi Geil! is a New Wave pop star loosely based on 1970s and 1980s Dutch rock star Herman Brood. Smit writes and sings the songs for the band, Maxi Geil! & PlayColt, the music a variety of pop that blends influences from Bryan Ferry, Roxy Music, Los Angeles-based band Sparks and David Bowie from the Ziggy Stardust era. There seems to be less irony in the playing of this character than in Grossmalerman: Blake Gopnik of The Washington Post suggested this might be the artist's truer alter ego whereas Roberta Smith of The New York Times detected a lessening of irony over time. William Powhida, writing in the Brooklyn Rail in 2004, read the fictional persona as representing "the underlying, uncensored desires and impulses of his audience."

The band includes his wife Rebecca Chamberlain, also on vocals, John Allen on lead guitar, and Mark Ephraim on rhythm guitar and others. With songs with titles like "I Will Leave You First" and "Making Love in the Sunshine," the group's music has been described as "anti-sentimental." In the latter song, for example, the band "request[s] your presence in the bathroom / When the music stops," and in "The Artist's Lament," Maxi croons "I want your vagina around the head of my prick." The band themselves describe themselves as "French pop / German pop / Italian pop" and have played in New York City and London, and released two albums. A Message to mMy Audience, their first full-length effort in 2004 in which the TV actress Zoe Lister-Jones (now known for her work on Whitney) appeared, as well as half-brother Tijn Smit, who played keyboard on the song, "Here Comes Maxi." The band released their second album, Strange Sensation, in 2007.

=== The Ballad of Bad Orpheus, 2000 ===
In this 22-minute video, a cruel ship captain (Smit) keeps his crewmen in thrall with his golden voice until they are finally able to overcome him. The crewmen are played by sculptor Tony Matelli and performance artist (and artistic influence) Michael Smith.

=== Nausea 2, 2004 ===
The most ambitious in the Maxi Geil! video series is an hour-long rock musical starring Smit and Chamberlain, as porn stars Maxi Geil! and Giselle Thrust who have reached a crossroads in their careers. A second plot involves a young amateur, Annie Ball (Lister Jones), whose own debut is interrupted by Maxi getting sick on set. The cast includes a bevy of Brooklynites: Luis Fernandez as Maxi's stern manager, Christian Viveros-Fauné, art critic and Smit's actual then-gallerist as a member of the Spanish press to hilarious effect, actor Leo Fitzpatrick (Kids and Sons of Anarchy) as a porn actor who suddenly grows some self-dignity in the middle of a shoot and flees.

When Maxi appears at a press conference to give his resignation speech, he accuses his peers for letting commodification ruin their work: "Have we been reduced as people to simply a couple of cheap fetishes? You let your imaginations run wild, and this is what you came up with? ... You people are libertines with the souls of bureaucrats, and I'm constantly amazed at your limitations." Smit told The Washington Post that this speech was "thinly veiled" criticism of his art world contemporaries. After revealing his return to theater, future projects, and new interest in dance, Maxi breaks into the song "Please Remember Me," in which he exhorts, "I've got a hard on for a station in your memories" and "I've got a bag of tricks, of images and / melodies/ I'm designed to keep your heart and mind so / ill at ease." But when he and Giselle finally meet and set out to find themselves, they end up shopping: This is Smit's attack on the notion of self-exploration in the work of his contemporaries that he feels have "forgotten the notion of exploration, of contradicting oneself, of trying to broaden one's horizons."

Gopnik of The Washington Post wrote, "The confusion between the roles of Smit and Geil—and between Geil [as] rock star and director, and Geil, the ... fictional porn king—make the artwork appealingly complex. It's as though Smit takes the premise of a mockumentary such as This is Spinal Tap, then gives it the density and even subtle conherence of good contemporary art." The writer also notes that the work leads to other questions. "The ambition that made Geil a star... also leads him into making work that pushes him beyond where his true talent lies. So should Geil stick with what he's good at, however modest it turns out to be, or try his hand at stuff that may turn out to be absurd musical pornography? Which is better, satisfying competence or interesting incoherence, even failure?" Art critic John Haber wrote that he found the work "less pretentious than a Matthew Barney epic cycle" and "more coherent."

The work, funded by Roebling Hall and the Indiana Museum of Contemporary Art in Indianapolis, debuted at MoMA during its fall 2004 reopening. Maxi Geil! & PlayColt also played at the event.

From 2005 to 2009, Smit was represented by Fred (London) Ltd. gallery in London.

=== A Message to My Audience, 2009 ===
This installation at Roebling Hall's first Manhattan space (above Fanelli's in SoHo) included three videos played on a screen in front of a bed with satin sheets. The videos are a "Zebra Countdown Video Klasse," footage of live performances of three songs that, among other things, indicate the band's fictitious level of international fame in a 1980s glam style. In the live performance of "Strange Sensation," Maxi arrives late and attempts to express the meaning of the song to a troupe of modern dancers who act out the song's love story. In the performance of "The Artist's Lament," Maxi-playing-Smit ends up covered in blood trying to make sense of the creative process. The bed in the installation is surrounded by Smit's paintings of Maxi and his band.

=== Making Love in the Sunshine music video, 2013 ===
Shot by the New York video artist John Pilson, the video stars Maxi as a werewolf and Chamberlain as a maiden cavorting in the Scottish Highlands (actually the Catskills, near the couple's summer family home). Village men, played by the other members of Playcolt, nymphs, and trolls abound, as well as a contemporary homeless man randomly sifting through garbage. Performer and burlesque tap dancer Jen Zakrzewski and artist Matt Jones also star.

== Paintings and installations ==
=== A Mountain of Skulls and Not One I Recognize, 2008–2010 ===
For a solo exhibition at Fred gallery in London, Smit produced about ten videos with simple scenarios that appeared on different-sized screens around the space. All the videos shared the same soundtrack Smit wrote with band member Mark Ephraim and New York-based new musician Okkyung Lee, with Smit intoning over Ephraim's rhythm guitar and Lee's cello. Each video was based on a drawing and had two or three actors involved in a theme of either power or obsession. Video artist John Pilson plays a doctor in one, to Matthew Shawlin's patient, who await an important diagnosis. In another, Bodine Alexander plays a woman waiting for her male companion in a bathroom as he pees; all the while they exchanging dreamy, knowing glances. In a third, performance artist Neal Medlyn and actress Zoe Lister-Jones (now known for her work on the TV show Whitney) play two GIs presumably in Iraq or Afghanistan exploring the human wreckage inside a structure they have just bombed. The remaining videos included artists Carol Bove, Will Cotton and Mina Chang, as actors.

Jason Cacioppo, the cameraman on all the videos, used many camera moves of 1970s European cinema, like that of Rainer Werner Fassbinder where zooms and pans are used to squeeze as much pathos and meaning out of each scene. Smit painted portraits of each actor in costume after the video production in either watercolor or oil and hung them with the videos in the installation.

Paintings, in watercolor, oil, or both are in or all of the Grossmalerman and Maxi Geil videos and installations. Powhida noted a "calculated feeling of disinterest" in the style. Smit has also produced flat works under his own name.

=== New York Times, 2007– ===
In 2007, he painted a series of made-up newspapers headlines and photos. Headlines such as "U.S. Troops Pledge Loyalty to Maktada al-Sadr" were by turns satirical and like "Who Shall Be the Helen of My Tragedy?" by turns plaintive. The series continues into the present, with headlines referencing the 2016 presidential candidates and the spate of police brutality in the U.S., and is entitled NY Times.

=== Mountain of Skulls, 2015–2016 ===
A series of humorous takes on the memento mori, Mountain of Skulls emerged from frustration while Smit was waiting for post-production work on his Grossmalerman videos. The imagery harks back to the artist's time on a school trip while at the Rietveld Academie, right after the 1989 Velvet Revolution, to the Sedlec Ossuary in Kutná Hora, in a part of Czechoslovakia that is now Slovakia. The skulls of those who died in the Black Death and 15th century Hussite Wars evoked for Smit the deaths of everyday people and whole towns wiped out by modern genocide. He decided to make a town's worth of skulls with individual captions like "Infinitely Reasonable," "Dull But Kind," and "Total Dick," creating an installation of 60 of the small gouache and watercolor paintings on paper for the Pulse Art Fair in Miami Beach. Online magazine Crave wrote that the series, painted in a range from constrained to loose, "stole the show." Smit's gallerist related that the work was "a mediation on vanitas, power, desire, and failure" and noted the installation's popularity with selfie takers. Smit will present over 100 in the series for his forthcoming show at Charles James Gallery in Los Angeles.

== Personal life ==
He is married to Rebecca Chamberlain, a visual artist and member of Max Geil! & PlayColt. They have two sons.
