= Gelah Penn =

American visual artist

- Born: 1951 (age 74–75); Beaver Falls, Pennsylvania, US
- Education: San Francisco Art Institute
- Known for: Installation art, constructed drawings, artist books
- Spouse: Stephen Maine
- Awards: MacDowell, Yaddo; Sharpe-Walentas Studio Program
- Website: Gelah Penn

Gelah Penn, Prologue, Site-responsive installation, various synthetic materials, dimensions variable, 2020.

Gelah Penn (born 1951) is an American visual artist based on the East Coast. She is known for site-responsive installations, three-dimensional drawings and collages that take an unconventional approach to disciplinary boundaries, materials and artistic methods. Her mixed-media, hybrid works are composed of accumulations of disparate materials and calligraphic gesture that respond to and disrupt the architectural spaces in which they are installed. Critics identify three defining aspects of her art: a commitment to non-narrative abstraction; a unifying interest in the language of drawing; and the use of lightweight, everyday synthetic materials like netting, fishing line, plastic bags and vinyl tubing. Critic Ann Landi wrote, "Penn's installations bristle with spiky energy, hugging the walls or colonizing corners, suggesting habitats created by insects with a taste for sci-fi, or abstract line drawings catapulted from two dimensions into three. The works are made from cheap and ordinary stuff ... but assume a busy, restless life, even as their titles hint at something a little more sinister."

Penn's art belongs to the collections of the Columbus Museum, Weatherspoon Art Museum and Arkansas Arts Center, among others. She has exhibited at those institutions and at SculptureCenter, Smack Mellon and the National Academy Museum, among other venues. After being based in New York, Penn lives and works in northwest Connecticut with her husband, artist-critic Stephen Maine.

== Life and career ==
Penn was born in Beaver Falls, Pennsylvania in 1951, the daughter of Holocaust survivors. She studied art briefly at Brandeis University, then catalogued early films for the American Film Institute for a year. After returning to art studies at the University of Maryland, she enrolled at the San Francisco Art Institute, where she worked with artist and Crown Point Press founder Kathan Brown and earned a BFA in painting.

After traveling in Italy for a year, Penn settled in a shared live-work loft in New York City. She produced colorful and abstract, tactile paintings sometimes encrusted with synthetic hair, while working part-time at the Dia Art Foundation. Her exposure at Dia to the work and processes of contemporary artists such as Fred Sandback, James Turrell and John Chamberlain encouraged an experimentation with found materials and increasingly sculptural work.

Penn has had solo exhibitions at Bookstein Projects, Foley Gallery, SUNY at Old Westbury and Undercurrent in New York; Real Art Ways, Icehouse Project Space and Furnace Art on Paper in Connecticut; Muhlenberg College (Pennsylvania); and Carl Berg Projects (Los Angeles). She appeared in surveys including: "The Persistence of Line" (2008) and "Degrees of Density" (2009, Kentler International Drawing Space); "Drawing Itself" (Brattleboro Museum and Art Center, 2009); "Textility" (Visual Arts Center of New Jersey, 2012); "Materiality: The Matter of Matter" (Center for Maine Contemporary Art, 2017); and "The Stubborn Influence of Painting," (Boulder Museum of Contemporary Art, 2021).

Penn's curatorial projects include the exhibitions "Diphthong" (Fiterman Art Center, 2015), "object'hood" (Lesley Heller Gallery, 2015) and "PLACE: Monumental Drawings" (Equity Gallery, 2016).

== Work and reception ==
Sculpture critic Patricia Rosoff wrote, "Penn's work embodies essentially Modernist principles: resolutely abstract, it firmly renounces narrative, representation and autobiography." She described the artist's strategies as formal, perceptual and materials-oriented with an emphasis on gesture, surface and relief that connects drawing and sculpture, as well as Eastern and Western pictorial traditions and philosophies. Penn's development was influenced by the work of sculptor Eva Hesse and poet and painter Henri Michaux's experimentations with automatic writing, among other sources. Her work has been compared to the layered, abstract installations of Judy Pfaff, Jessica Stockholder and Sarah Sze and to the early assemblages of Bruce Conner.

Penn's central interest in drawing places greater weight in her art on line, form and structure over the more emotional realm of color. Tom McGlynn observed that a key dialectic in the work contrasts expansive, baroque pictorial structures against its quotidian, sometimes abject materials; he discerned "in the torqueing planes and staccato details" a "rhythmic counterpoint similar to a monumental Rubens allegory or a Gericault history painting" (despite the lack of representational imagery). Others identify a similar contradiction between its use of durable (if lightweight) materials and the impermanence of the installations.

Penn's work is also informed by film. Her installations are often panoramic, unfolding beyond the field of vision in sequences that shift in light and shadow with a viewer's movement and vantage point. She intentionally chooses ordinary materials—and showier substances like Mylar—for their qualities of translucency or opacity and matteness or reflectivity. With its emphasis on shadow and often-minimal color, the work visually echoes the stark, graphic quality of film noir—something acknowledged in titles such as The Naked Kiss, Shadow of a Doubt, The Big Heat and The Big Red One derived from older movies.

Neither fixed nor finite, Penn's installations are created on-site and convey an improvisatory, provisional and performative aspect. Her process involves an initial site visit or photographs, followed by rudimentary, exploratory sketches. She then constructs loose, preparatory concentrations of activity in her studio. When ready, she rolls up, bags and transports them to the exhibition space, where they are adjusted and the actual work is composed, often in response to architectural challenges such as columns, arches, ductwork, skylights and corridors. Critics describe the installations as "infecting" or "colonizing" their spaces with "welters of incident" under which such supports seem to disintegrate.

Gelah Penn, The Reckless Moment (detail), Site-responsive installation, various synthetic materials, dimensions variable, 2008.

=== Installations ===
Penn's site-specific installations developed from early mixed-media sculptures in which she wove vinyl tubing and line into and over armatures made of wire birdcages and fan grills. After eliminating the underlying structures, she worked directly on walls before expanding more fully into architectural space. In installations like Swing Time, Criss Cross (LA) and Detour (all 2006), Penn explored line in three-dimensional space through web- and hive-like constructions composed of knotted, looped and clustered, neon-hued filament that were connected by strands and flecked with ping pong balls, felt circles and copper wire.

Reviewers find diverse connections in Penn's installations, likening them to writing, musical scoring, graffiti or doodling, natural events and organisms. Considering the work The Reckless Moment (2008), New York Times critic Benjamin Genocchio noted "an ethereal feeling, conjuring associations with dust storms, weather systems or, on the microscopic level, the arterial network of the human body" and bacterial colonies. The 40-foot, mostly black installation Clash by Night (2009) was described as a "cocoon" whose spiraling swirls and loops of tubing, netting and shadow converged in a corner. These organic associations are furthered by Penn's methods of assemblage, which include instances of filament that seem to mysteriously issue from and disappear into the wall as if suspended or floating.

Penn's subsequent installations, such as Niagara (2012), The Come On (2013), Polyglot Y (Unhinged) (2015) and Situations (2017), assumed denser, less ethereal form with layered, constructivist-like planes of new materials like Mylar, aluminum insulation, lenticular plastic and painted tarps. The loosely gridded horizontality of the latter work invited comparisons to cinema and landscape painting as well as to the serial assemblages of Robert Rauschenberg. Penn continued in a similar vein in the largely black, white and gray installations High Tide (2018), Ebb Tide (2019) and Prologue (2020). High Tide transformed a skybridge in a Philip Johnson-designed gallery space, creating a dialectic between individual parts and unified whole, and disposable matter and architectural permanence. Prologue was a 33-foot-long work composed of the artist's characteristic materials connected by horizontal linear elements, which moved in a step-like rhythm of quiet progression and busyness along the length of a stairway wall.

Gelah Penn, Stele#9, Polyester mesh, lenticular plastic, plastic bags & mesh, silicone tubing, staples, Styrofoam ball, Velcro, eyellets and T-pins, 90" x 49" x 30", 2019.

=== Drawing and collage series ===
Penn's more self-contained, individual works have been called constructed or three-dimensional "drawings in space." Her "Splink" (2006), "Scribble" (2006–11) and "Blackfil" (2007–10) series consisted of episodes of contrast—blots of black and dark gray paint, torn plastic bag, filament and graphite squiggles—flaring up against whitish fields of wall or translucent materials. Critic Peter Frank wrote of this work, "There is a naturality to Penn's 'installed drawings' that suggests such drawings have appeared, and continue to metamorphose, organically, as if rendered by aesthetically driven spiders or mold spores." In the "Polyglot" series (2013-17), Penn shifted to layered, planar forms of folded, crumpled and punctured lenticular plastic and translucent Yupo paper. The "Stele" series (2020) featured cruciform arrangements, ethereal materials and shadows, and a sharp verticality suggesting figural presences.

Penn's Notes on Clarissa is an ongoing project inspired by the tragic 18th-century Samuel Richardson novel Clarissa, a story of seduction and betrayal, told primarily through letters. She has presented the work in various forms, including an installation of 99 individual collages that reworked photographic exhibition cards from her prior installations, each collage alluding to one letter in the novel. John Mendelsohn deemed the project exemplary of Penn's art—a work "made of fragments, with the concomitant impulse to make something cohere from them. To use Robert Smithson's phrase, the pieces 'rise into ruin', as scraps from life are salvaged and given a new life, but retain a feeling of the abject and the vulnerable."

== Collections and recognition ==
Penn has been awarded residencies from MacDowell (1989), the Sharpe-Walentas Studio Program (2010) and Yaddo (2014). She received a Tree of Life artist grant in 2016 and a Connecticut Artist fellowship in 2017. Her work belongs to the public collections of the Arkansas Arts Center, Brooklyn Museum Library, Cleveland Institute of Art, Columbus Museum and Weatherspoon Art Museum.
