= A Woman, a Part =

- Directed by: Elisabeth Subrin
- Written by: Elisabeth Subrin
- Produced by: Scott Macaulay; Shrihari Sathe
- Starring: Maggie Siff; Cara Seymour; John Ortiz
- Cinematography: Chris Dapkins
- Edited by: Jennifer Ruff
- Production companies: Speculative Pictures; Infinitum Productions; Durga Entertainment
- Distributed by: Strand Releasing
- Release dates: January 31, 2016 (Rotterdam); March 22, 2017 (United States)
- Running time: 98 minutes
- Country: United States
- Language: English

A Woman, a Part is a 2016 independent drama film, written and directed by Elisabeth Subrin. The story concerns Anna Baskin (Maggie Siff), a successful yet burnt out actress who absconds from a mind-numbing television role in LA to reinvent herself in NYC, confronting the past and the people she left behind in the process.

== Cast ==
- Maggie Siff as Anna Baskin
- Cara Seymour as Kate
- John Ortiz as Isaac
- Khandi Alexander as Leslie
- Dagmara Domińczyk as Nadia
- Sophie Von Haselberg as Alex
- Eszter Balint as Heidi
- Lucas Near-Verbrugghe as Sam
- Laila Robins as Bernadette

== Release ==
The film premiered at the 2016 International Film Festival Rotterdam. Strand Releasing acquired all rights to US distribution. The film was released on March 22, 2017 on limited screens.

== Reception ==
On the review aggregator website Rotten Tomatoes, 87% of 15 critics' reviews are positive, with an average rating of 6.8/10. Metacritic, which uses a weighted average, assigned the film a score of 66 out of 100, based on 8 critics, indicating "generally favorable" reviews.

Owen Gleiberman of Variety lauded Siff's performance, noting "It’s also got a fascinating actress. Maggie Siff...has a distinctive brainy sensuality, with hints of neurotic anger." Jeannette Catsoulis of The New York Times praised the filmmaking, stating, "Ms. Subrin, an accomplished visual artist and filmmaker, sifts addiction, celebrity and the plight of the aging actress into something rarefied yet real." Glenn Kenny of RogerEbert.com awarded the film 3 out of 4 stars, writing that the film "mixes passion and ambivalence to create a work with ambiguities that seem earned, and lived in."

Neil Young of The Hollywood Reporter was less impressed with the film itself, finding the "conventional, even familiar nature all the more puzzling" given Subrin's past work. Nevertheless, Young reserved particular praise for Seymour's "nuanced supporting turn", further stating that, "Seymour has somehow never quite attained the household-name status her talents deserve." He commended Ortiz as well, noting that "it's always a delight to see Ortiz flex acting muscles that he doesn't often get to deploy in his more lucrative Hollywood outings". Kristen Yoonsoo Kim of The Village Voice found the film "impressive" yet "stylistically conventional", but commended Siff's "modest but poignant performance that rings true for women of a certain age and career."
