= Dave Cole (artist) =

American sculptor

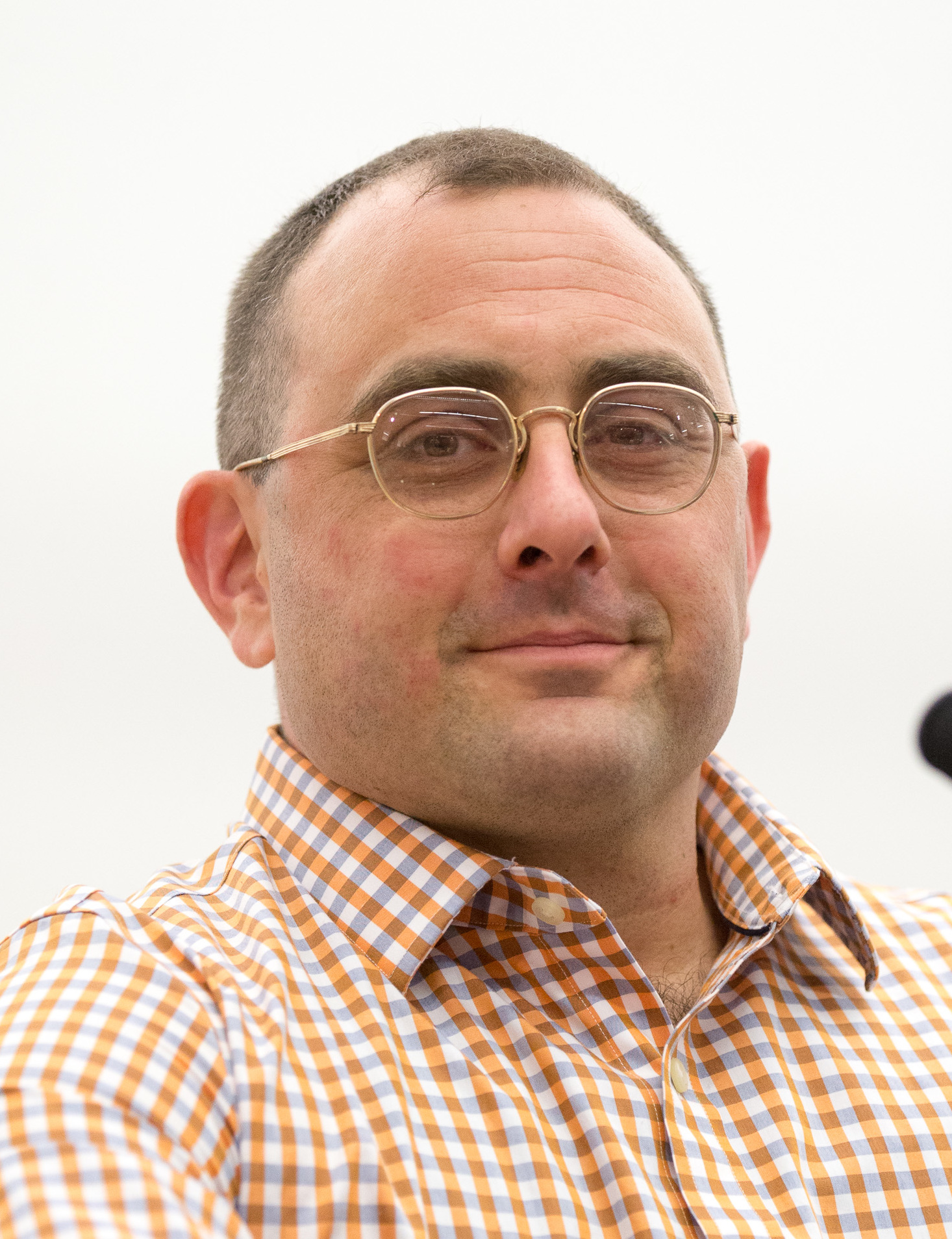
- Born: 1975 (age 50–51); Etna, New Hampshire
- Education: Brown University
- Website: http://www.davecoledavecole.com

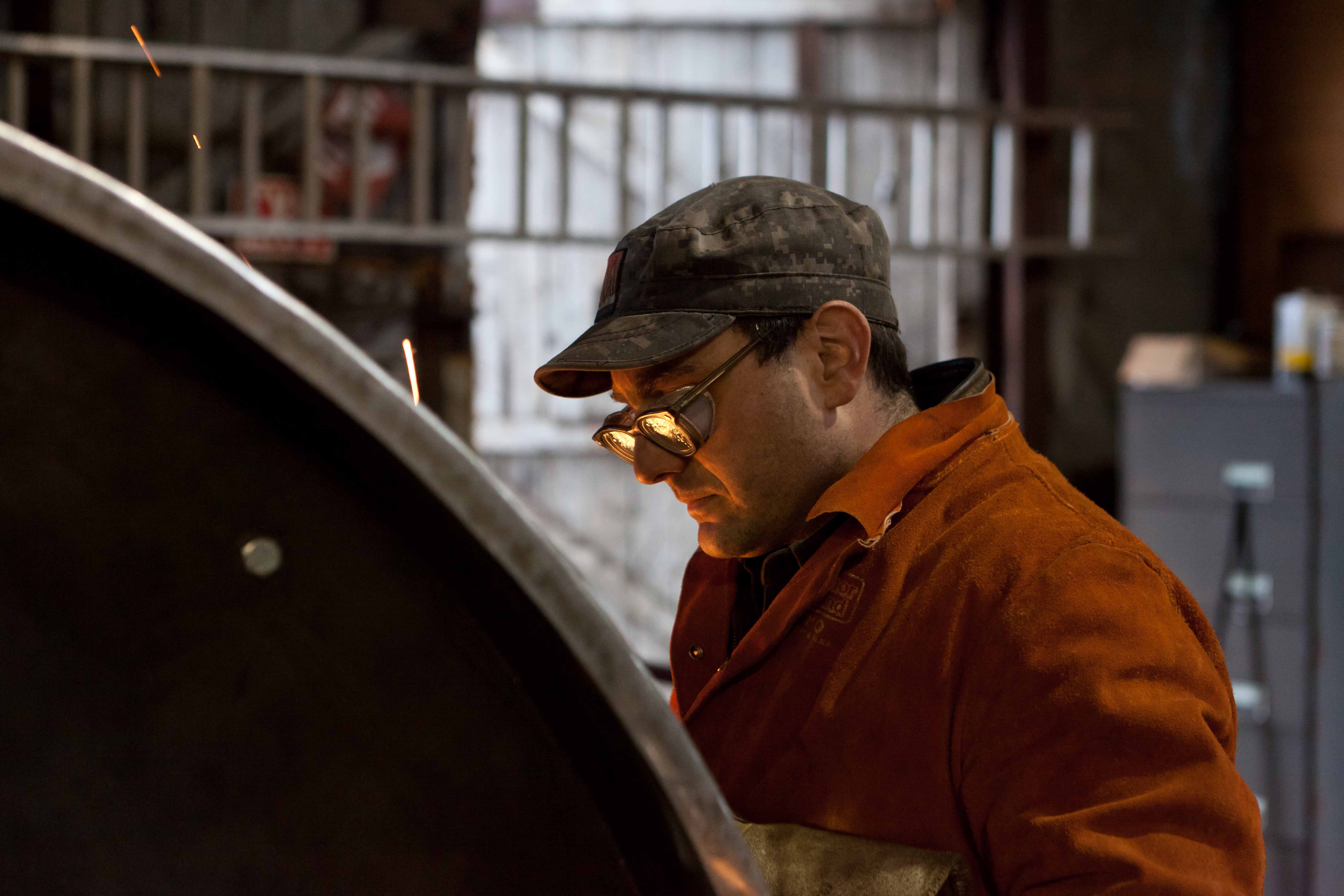
Cole at work on his sculpture, The Music Box (2012)

Dave Cole (born 1975 in Etna, New Hampshire) is an American contemporary visual artist specializing in sculpture.

Cole's work is characterized by an interest in politics, patriotism, nostalgia, and masculinity. He lives and works in Hudson, New York. Formerly represented by DODGEgallery in New York City and the Judi Rotenberg Gallery in Boston, he is currently self-represented.

== Background ==
=== Early life ===
Cole grew up on his family's farm in Hanover, New Hampshire, where he spent time in his grandfather's blacksmith shop. Dave's father taught him how to weld when he was 11 years old.

=== Education ===
Cole attended Hanover High School in Hanover, New Hampshire, and then graduated from The Putney School in Putney, Vermont, in 1995. He attended Landmark College in Putney before transferring to Brown University, where he earned his BA in Visual Arts.

== Career ==
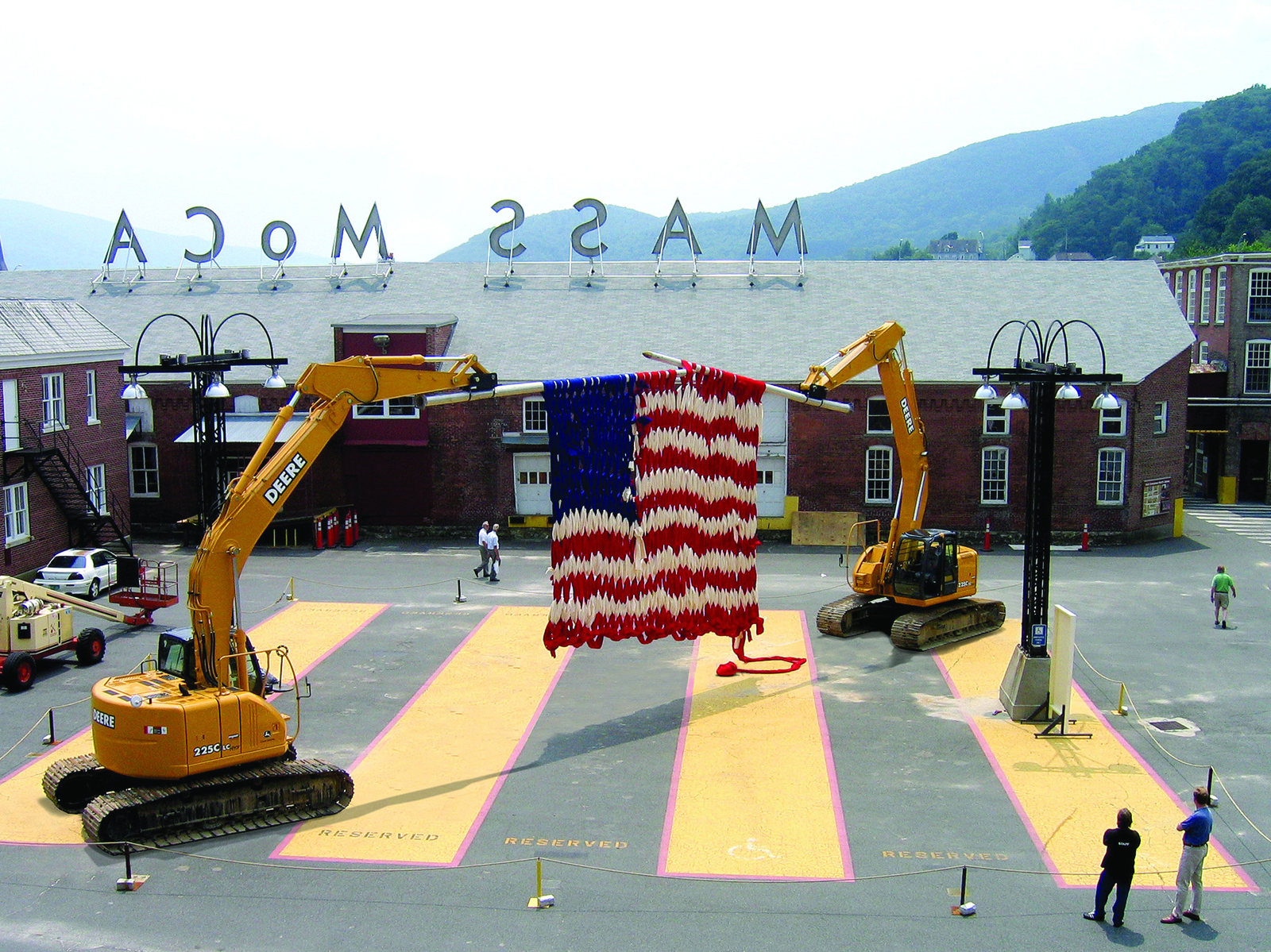
The Knitting Machine, 2005. Photo courtesy of Mass MoCA.

In 2013, Cole participated in the centennial anniversary of the Armory Show in the Focus Section on America curated by Eric Shiner, director of the Andy Warhol Museum. Cole's recent exhibitions include a solo exhibition at DODGEgallery in 2012, 40 Under 40 at the Smithsonian Museum of Art, Renwick Gallery (2012-2013), Flags of the World at the Norton Museum of Art (2011-2012), The Music Box at the Cleveland Institute of Art (2012). In 2010, Cole had his first New York solo exhibition at DODGEgallery. He has had prior solo shows at the Aldrich Contemporary Art Museum (2009) and Mass MoCA (2005). Through mixing conceptual craft and assemblage, Cole's work attempts to embed subversive meaning and political message into his material and process. Cole reconstitutes found and ready-made objects such as discharged bullets and casings and eviscerated flag fragments, as well as fabricated materials such as cast lead and knitted metal fiber. His subject matter often draws from symbols of nostalgia, childhood, and more recently, poetry and landscape.

He has exhibited at national and international museums, including the Museum of Arts and Design, New York, NY; Aldrich Contemporary Art Museum, Ridgefield, CT; Mass MoCA, North Adams, MA; Renwick Gallery at the Smithsonian American Art Museum, Washington, D.C.; Norton Museum of Art, Palm Beach, FL; DeCordova Museum and Sculpture Park, Lincoln, MA; 21c Museum, Louisville, KY; Norton Museum of Art, Palm Beach, FL; Framingham, MA; Indiana State Museum, Indianapolis; Scottsdale Museum of Contemporary Art, Scottsdale, AZ; Vestlanske Kunstindustrimuseum, Bergen, Norway; Nasjonal Museet, Oslo, Norway; Haifa Museum of Art, Haifa, Israel; and the Textielmuseum, Tilburg, Netherlands. In 2009 he participated in the Big West Festival in Melbourne, Australia, one of many recent international projects. Cole was the recipient of the 2009 deCordova Sculpture Park and Museum's annual Rappaport Prize, and his work has been reviewed in Artforum, Art in America, ARTnews, Modern Painters, Art Papers, and The Boston Globe, among others. His work is included in the collection of the Smithsonian American Art Museum, Danforth Museum, Wellington Management, 21c Museum, RISD Museum, the Burger Collection and Jaermuseet Vitenfabrikken.

== ADHD ==
=== Learning Outside the Lines ===
Cole has been vocal about his struggles with Attention Deficit Hyperactivity Disorder. While an undergraduate student he coauthored Learning Outside the Lines with Jonathan Mooney who is dyslexic and was also a Brown undergraduate student at the time. Motivated by the complete lack of any writing on the subject by the students with similar struggles, Mooney and Cole tell their personal stories and describe the study strategies they found to be effective as they navigated the educational system.

=== Project Eye-to-Eye ===
Working again with Jonathan Mooney and while they were both at Brown, Cole co-founded a mentoring program called Project Eye-to-Eye. Its aim was to match LD/ADHD Brown University and Rhode Island School of Design students with local LD/ADHD students according to a learning profile. The pairs worked together one-on-one, and the entire group worked together to complete weekly art projects. The program has since expanded nationally and is now operating 170 chapters in 24 states.

== 9/11 ==
In the days and weeks following 9/11, Cole worked as a volunteer at the World Trade Center site. He travelled by bus from Rhode Island to New York and was passed through the barricades by a group of union ironworkers. Cole transported alternating loads of waste, respirators, dry clothing, and food from depots outside the cordon to the recovery workers on the bucket line. Several writers have suggested that 9/11 generally and this experience specifically, has had a significant impact on the content of Cole's work made after this time.
