= Dawn Clements =

American contemporary artist and educator

- Born: 1958; Woburn, Massachusetts, U.S.
- Died: December 2018 (aged 59–60); Bronx, New York, U.S.
- Education: State University of New York at Albany, Brown University
- Known for: Panoramic drawings

Dawn Clements (1958–2018) was an American contemporary artist and educator. She was known for her large scale, panoramic drawings of interiors that were created with many different materials in a collage-style. Her primary mediums were sumi ink and ballpoint pen on small to large scale paper panels. In order to complete a drawing she cut and pasted paper, editing and expanding the composition to achieve the desired scale. Her completed drawings reveal her working process through the wrinkles and folds evident in the paper. She described her work as "a kind of visual diary of what [she] see[s], touch[es], and desire[s]. As I move between the mundane empirical spaces of my apartment and studio, and the glamorous fictions of movies, apparently seamless environments are disturbed through ever-shifting points of view."

== Early life and education ==
Clements was born in Woburn, Massachusetts, in 1958. She was raised in Chelmsford, Massachusetts, where she graduated from Chelmsford High School. She received her M.F.A. from the State University of New York at Albany in 1989 and her B.A. from Brown University in 1986.

Clements has described drawing from an early age, including making drawings on the walls of her childhood home in Chelmsford. She grew up in a household with three brothers, and her father was also an artist, which influenced her early interest in drawing. She later recalled observing her father’s daily drawing practice, which emphasised consistency and repetition over finished results.

== Work ==
Clements made large-scale drawings that explored interior spaces. Her drawings were inspired by her own domestic environment and also by rooms viewed in soap operas and melodramatic films. She was especially interested in the spaces that women occupy. In her drawings, Clements often compiled a selection of film interiors observed from different angles. The final arrangement of these interiors played with perception and perspective. The drawing flowed over multiple pieces of paper to create a distorted panorama that reflected time, memory, space, and home. “With the panoramic drawings,” she said, “I’m interested in the way we see as we move through life, instead of when we’re sitting still.”

Clements' drawing Mrs. Jessica Drummond's (My Reputation, 1945) (2010) was featured in the 2010 Whitney Biennial. It's a drawing of the bedroom of the main character in the film My Reputation in ballpoint pen. Unlike most of her interiors, this drawing depicts the actress Barbara Stanwyck playing Jessica Drummond. The drawing is a combination of several scenes and shows different moments and camera angles in the room.

Clements taught classes in fine arts at Rhode Island School of Design (RISD), Maryland Institute College of Art (MICA), California Institute of the Arts (CalArts), Brooklyn College, and Princeton University.

She received many awards, including a Guggenheim Fellowship in Fine Arts in 2012, the Civitella Ranieri Foundation Fellowship in 2013, and the Joan Mitchell Foundation Fellowship in 2015.

Clements died December 4, 2018, in Bronx, New York, after a battle with breast cancer.

== Exhibitions ==
Select solo exhibitions

- 2017: Dawn Clements: Tables and pills and things, Pierogi, Brooklyn, New York
- 2015: New Work, Pierogi, Brooklyn, New York
- 2012: Dawn Clements, New Work, with Sculptures by Marc Leuthold, Pierogi, Brooklyn, New York
- 2011: Dawn Clements: Sint-Trudoabdij, Maele Castle, Bruges Belgium
- 2010: Still Life, Hales Gallery, London, England
- 2010: Home Sick, Acme Gallery, Los Angeles, California
- 2010: Boiler, The Boiler, Brooklyn, New York
- 2009: Portrait Rooms, Mark W. Potter Gallery at the Taft School, Watertown, CT
- 2008: Conditions of Desire, Pierogi, Leipzig, Germany
- 2007: Conditions of Desire, Pierogi, Brooklyn, New York
- 2007: Movie, John and June Allcott Gallery, The University of North Carolina, Chapel Hill, North Carolina
- 2006: Art Now; Dawn Clements, Middlebury College Museum of Art, Middlebury, Vermont
- 2006: Dawn Clements; Recent Drawings, Herter Art Gallery, University of Massachusetts Amherst, Massachusetts
- 2004: Drawing, Pierogi, Brooklyn, New York
- 2004: Feigen Contemporary, New York, New York
- 2003: Drawing, Pierogi, Brooklyn, New York
- 2002: Drawings, Greene Gallery, Rensselaer Polytechnic Institute, Troy, New York
- 1995: Albany Center Galleries, Albany, New York

Select group exhibitions

- 2020: Affinities and Outliers: Highlights from the University at Albany Fine Art Collections, University Art Museum, University at Albany, State University of New York
- 2016: PLACE: Monumental Drawings by Dawn Clements, Cynthia Lin, Gelah Penn, Fran Siegel, New York Artists Equity Association, New York
- 2016: It was Never Linear… Recent Painting, Sheldon Museum of Art, Lincoln, NB
- 2016: Rage for Art (Once Again), Pierogi, New York, NY
- 2015: Space, Light, and Disorder, Kathryn Markel Fine Arts, New York, NY
- 2015: Dialogues: Drawings and Works on Paper, Satellite Contemporary, Las Vegas, NV
- 2015: Fractured: Works on Paper, Helen Day Art Center
- 2015: August Flowers, James Barron Art, Kent, CT
- 2015: Community of Influence, curated by Chuck Webster, Spencer Brownstone, New York, NY
- 2015: Back and Forth: collaborative works of Dawn Clements and Marc Leuthold, Bates College Museum of Art, Lewiston, ME
- 2014: PIEROGI XX: Twentieth Anniversary Exhibition, Pierogi, Brooklyn, NY
- 2014: Brown University 250th Anniversary Alumni Exhibition, Part 1, David Winton Bell Gallery, Brown University, Providence, RI
- 2014: Criminal’s Cinema, Honey Ramka, Brooklyn, NY. Curated by John O’Connor
- 2014: Come Like Shadows, curated by David Cohen, Zurcher Studio, New York, NY
- 2013: Paper, Saatchi Gallery, London, England
- 2013: Ghost of Architecture: Recent Gifts, Promised Gifts, and Acquisitions, Henry Art Gallery, University of Washington, Seattle, WA
- 2013: Ballpoint Pen Drawing Since 1950, curated by Richard Klein, Aldrich Contemporary Art Museum, Ridgefield, CT
- 2013: Susan Rethorst: Inquiring Mind / Choreographic Mind, Goodhard Hall, Bryn Mawr College, Bryn Mawr, PA
- 2012: Echo of Echo, curated by Shirley Tse and Marichris Ty, Shoshana Wayne Gallery, Santa Monica, CA
- 2012: Making Room: The Space Between Two & Three Dimensions, Mass MoCA, North Adams, MA
- 2012: 11th National Drawing Invitational: New York, Singular Drawings, Curated by Charlotta Kotik, Arkansas Arts Center, Little Rock, AR
- 2012: seven @ SEVEN, The Boiler, Brooklyn, NY
- 2012: Inside Outside / Outside In, Lesley Heller Gallery, New York, NY
- 2012: Cinema, curated by Rik de Boe, Voorkamer, Lier, Belgium
- 2011: Susan Rethorst: RETRO-(intro)SPECTIVE, curated by Melinda Ring, Danspace Project, New York, NY
- 2011: Works on Paper, Acme Gallery, LA, CA
- 2011: Paper Variables, Dieu Donné, New York, NY
- 2011: Subjective Objective, Pierogi, Brooklyn, NY
- 2011: After School Special: The 2011 Alumni Show, University Art Museum, Albany, NY
- 2010: The Logic of Paper, He Xiangning Art Museum, Shenzhen, China
- 2010: Stranger than Fiction, Santa Barbara Museum of Art, Santa Barbara, CA
- 2010: Art on Paper 2010, Weatherspoon Art Museum, The University of North Carolina at Greensboro, Greensboro, NC
- 2010: Whitney Biennial 2010, Whitney Museum of American Art, New York, NY
- 2009: Same Sweet Dream, curated by Martina Batan, Dieu Donne, New York, NY
- 2009: Contemporary Large-Scale Drawings from the West Collection, Pollock Gallery, Southern Methodist University, Dallas, TX
- 2009: Modernizing Melodrama, Carleton College, Northfield, MN
- 2008: Edward Hopper and Contemporary Art, curated by Gerald Matt and Ilse Lafer, Kunsthalle Wien, Vienna, Austria
- 2008: Light, Seeking Light, Western Bridge, Seattle, WA
- 2008: Pierogi et al, Daniel Weinberg Gallery, Los Angeles, CA
- 2008: Uncanny Drawings, Porta 33; Colecção Madeira Corporate Services
- 2007: Nieuwe Collectie, curated by Rik de Boe, Wuyts Van Campen Museum, Lier, Belgium
- 2007: Per Square Foot, Benefit Auction and Inaugural Exhibition, Dieu Donné, New York, NY
- 2007: Cosmologies, James Cohan Gallery, New York, NY
- 2007: Continuum, The Temporary Museum of Painting, Brooklyn, NY
- 2007: Come One, Come All, 3rd Ward, Brooklyn, NY
- 2006: Storylines, 4-person show Snug Harbor, Staten Island, NY
- 2006: The Ink Painting Biennial, Taipei, Taiwan
- 2006: Twice Drawn, Wachenheim Gallery, Tang Museum, Skidmore College, Saratoga Springs, NY
- 2006: The Means Justified, Central Connecticut State University, New Britain, CT
- 2006: Our Town: Artists on Architecture, curated by David Scher, HUT (Hudson Untitled Foundation), Hudson, NY,
- 2006: Double Monde, CIAC Gallery, Pont-Aven, France
- 2006: Group Exhibition, PIEROGI Leipzig, Germany
- 2006: Available (A Still Life Show), curated by Angela Dufresne and Monya Rowe, Monya Rowe Gallery, New York, NY
- 2006: Drawing Conclusions on the Wall, Guggenheim Gallery, Chapman University
- 2006: The Space Between Us, University Art Museum, University at Albany, New York
- 2005: DRAWN 2: Contemporary Drawings, Schick Art Gallery, Skidmore College, Saratoga Springs, NY
- 2005: Galerie Rolf Hengesbach, Koln, Germany
- 2005: True North, Miami Int’l Airport, Miami, FL
- 2005: SAFN Museum, Reykjavik, Iceland
- 2004: In Door Out, ACME Gallery, Los Angeles, CA (organized in collaboration with Chip Tom)
- 2004: Vacation Nation, Pierogi, Brooklyn, NY
- 2004: The Drawn Page, The Aldrich Contemporary Art Museum and Hersam-Acorn Newspapers, Ridgefield, CT
- 2004: Score! Action Drawing, curated by Marisa Olson, White Columns, New York, NY
- 2004: Story/Line, curated by Robert Harshorn Shimshak, New Langton Arts, San Francisco, CA.
- 2004: Open House; Working in Brooklyn, The Brooklyn Museum of Art, Brooklyn, NY
- 2004: Exhibition of Painting and Sculpture, The American Academy of Arts and Letters, New York, NY
- 2004: AMP, The Pierogi Flat File Project, The Andy Warhol Museum, Pittsburgh, PA2003
- 2004: Explaining Magic, Rotunda Gallery, Brooklyn, NY
- 2004: Silver, Art Gallery of Greater Victoria, Victoria, British Columbia, Canada
- 2004: Some Panoramas, curated by Paul Hedge, Pump House Gallery, London.
- 2004: In Heat, Pierogi, Brooklyn, NY
- 2004: Pierogi Presents, curated by Joe Amrhein, Bernard Toale Gallery, Boston, MA
- 2004: The Incredible Lightness of Being, curated by Phong Bui, Black & White Gallery, Brooklyn, NY
- 2002: Next Next Wave, curated by Dan Cameron, Brooklyn Academy of Music
- 2002: Home Sweet Home, curated by Lisa Young, Firehouse Gallery, Garden City NY
- 2002: 25th Anniversary Selections, The Drawing Center, New York, NY
- 2002: Boiled or Fried, Pierogi, Brooklyn, NY
- 2002: Ratio 3, Brooklyn, NY
- 2002: Self-Portraits, from the Collection of Bill and Ruth True, The Wright Exhibition Space, Seattle, WA
- 2002: Drawings, Greene Art Gallery, Rensselaer Polytechnic Institute, Troy, NY
- 2002: Harlem Flophouse, curated by Rene Calvo, New York, NY
- 2001: Harlem Flophouse, curated by Rene Calvo, New York, NY
- 2000: Superduper New York, Pierogi 2000, Brooklyn, NY
- 1998: Second Skin, curated by Corinna Ripps, The University Art Museum, Albany, NY
- 1997: Let Me Be Frank, (set design and production), Clemente Soto Velez Cultural Center, NY, NY
- 1997: Mohawk-Hudson Regional, curated by Dan Cameron, The University Art Museum, Albany, NY
- 1997: New York State Biennial, curated by Ken Johnson, The New York State Museum, Albany, NY
- 1997: Skidmore College Faculty Exhibition, Skidmore College, Saratoga Springs, NY
- 1997: Berkshire Art Association Exhibition, Skidmore College, Saratoga Springs, NY
- 1997: Four Lives to Live, curated by Sharon Bates, Mercer Gallery, Rochester, NY
- 1997: Sub Rosa, Joyce Goldstein Gallery, New York, NY
- 1997: Mohawk-Hudson Regional Exhibition, curated by Jock Reynolds, Albany Institute of History and Art, Albany, NY
- 1997: Downtown Troy Window Project, Four Lives to Live, Site 2, Troy, NY
- 1995: Side Show, curated by Karen Kimmel, New York, NY
- 1995: Protective Covering, curated by Michael Oatman, Colburn Gallery, Burlington, VT
- 1995: Gallery Rebolloso, Minneapolis, MN
- 1995: Body Count, curated by Corinna Ripps, Russell Sage College Gallery, Troy, NY
- 1995: Gradus ad Parnassum, curated by Michael Neff, Kunsthaus Welker, Heidelberg, Germany
- 1995: Codex, curated by Corinna Ripps, The University Museum, Albany, NY
- 1995: Drawing’94, Explorations, Sharadin Art Gallery, Kutztown University, Kutztown, PA
- 1993: The Venice Bienniale: Aperto ’93, Venice, Italy
- 1993: Anxious Art, Bernard Toale Gallery, Boston, MA
- 1993: The Return of the Cadavre Exquis, (traveling exhibition), Drawing Center, New York, NY, The Corcoran Gallery, Washington, DC, American Center, Paris, France, and other locations
- 1993: Gallery Rebolloso, Minneapolis, MN
- 1993: Volume 1, curated by Andrew Boardman, Boulevard Project Space, Albany, NY1992
- 1993: Selections/ Winter ’92, The Drawing Center, New York, NY
- 1993: Resuscaitating Still Life, a collaborative installation with students of Berkshire Community
- 1993: College, Koussevitsky Gallery, Pittsfield, MA
