= DODGEgallery =

Coordinates: 40.72127°N 73.99253°W

DODGEgallery was an American contemporary art gallery on the Lower East Side of New York City. It was established in 2010 and closed in 2014.

== History ==
The gallery was founded in 2010 by Kristen Dodge on the Lower East Side of Manhattan, and closed in 2014. DODGEgallery hosted 56 exhibitions during its run, and represented 13 artists: Rebecca Chamberlain, Dave Cole, Taylor Davis, Environmental Services, Darren Blackstone Foote, Ted Gahl, Sheila Gallagher, Ellen Harvey, Jane Fox Hipple, Jason Middlebrook, Daniel Phillips, Cordy Ryman and Lorna Williams. Modern Painters listed DODGEgallery as one of the top 500 galleries in the world in 2013.
