= Leaves of Grass (film) =

- Promotional poster
- Directed by: Tim Blake Nelson
- Written by: Tim Blake Nelson
- Produced by: John Langley; Elie Cohn; Kristina Dubin; William Migliore; Tim Blake Nelson; Edward Norton
- Starring: Edward Norton; Keri Russell; Tim Blake Nelson; Richard Dreyfuss; Susan Sarandon
- Cinematography: Roberto Schaefer
- Edited by: Michelle Botticelli
- Music by: Jeff Danna
- Production company: First Look Studios
- Distributed by: Millennium Films
- Release dates: September 14, 2009 (TIFF); September 17, 2010 (United States)
- Running time: 105 minutes
- Country: United States
- Language: English
- Budget: $9 million
- Box office: $1 million

Leaves of Grass is a 2009 American black comedy film written and directed by Tim Blake Nelson. It stars Edward Norton as twin brothers, alongside Richard Dreyfuss, Nelson, Susan Sarandon, Melanie Lynskey and Keri Russell.

Set in Nelson's home state of Oklahoma, most of the film was actually filmed in northwestern Louisiana, which was selected for its generous film production incentives. A few scenes were filmed in Tulsa.

Leaves of Grass was featured at the 2009 Toronto International Film Festival, and had a limited domestic release by First Look Studios on just six screen April 2, 2010. It failed to impress at the domestic box office, earning a meager US$70,066 in ticket sales against a production budget of US$9,000,000. Critical reception was slightly positive, but mixed. The film fared much better internationally, earning US$948,687.

== Plot ==
Bill Kincaid is lecturing his class at Brown University about Plato's Socratic dialogues. Meanwhile, Bill's identical twin brother Brady Kincaid is living in Oklahoma, growing and selling hydroponic cannabis. Brady is under pressure from local drug lord Pug Rothbaum to expand his sales. Despite needing money to repay a debt to Rothbaum, Brady refuses.

After a phone call from Brady's partner Bolger telling him that Brady has died from a crossbow arrow, Bill flies to Tulsa, meeting a Jewish orthodontist on the plane. In Tulsa, Bill is mistaken for Brady and is beaten up and knocked unconscious by rival marijuana dealers angry that Brady has taken half their territory. When Bill wakes, he finds that Brady is alive and has tricked him into travelling to Tulsa. Brady asks Bill to pretend to be Brady while he goes up state to "take care" of Rothbaum. Bill initially refuses, but later agrees, after meeting local poet Janet as he wants to stay and get to know her better.

While Bill (pretending to be Brady) visits their mother, thus giving Brady an alibi, Bolger and Brady go to a synagogue in Tulsa, where Rothbaum is listening to a sermon. Also present is Ken Feinman, the orthodontist Bill met on the plane. He sees Brady and mistakes him for Bill. Brady and Bolger leave with Rothbaum, and Rothbaum demands the money Brady owes him. When Rothbaum threatens to kill them if they don't pay up, Bolger shoots Rothbaum's thugs, and Brady stabs Rothbaum, killing him.

In Tulsa, Ken Feinman hears of Rothbaum's murder and figures everything out. He purchases a gun and sets off for Brady's house, where he encounters Bill and Brady and threatens to shoot them. Bill takes the gun from him but Ken panics and uses Bolger's rifle to shoot Brady, after which Bill shoots Ken in retaliation. Before dying, Brady tells Bill to place the gun in his hand, which Bill does.

After an abortive attempt to sell Brady's dope-growing system to one of Brady's former rivals, Bill is shot through the chest by a crossbow. Bolger frantically drives him to hospital, saving Bill's life, and thereby repaying his debt to Brady (who had saved his life in prison). Bill is forced to stay in Tulsa for a long recuperation after his injury, allowing him time to heal his relationship with his mother and develop his romance with Janet.

== Cast ==
- Edward Norton as identical twins Bill and Brady Kincaid
- Richard Dreyfuss as Pug Rothbaum, a business partner of Brady's
- Susan Sarandon as Daisy Kincaid, Bill and Brady's mother
- Keri Russell as Janet, a friend of Brady's and Bill's new romantic interest
- Tim Blake Nelson as Rick Bolger, Brady's best friend
- Melanie Lynskey as Colleen, Brady's pregnant girlfriend
- Steve Earle as Buddy Fuller, a rival drug dealer of Brady's
- Lucy DeVito as Anne, a student in love with Bill
- Lee Wilkof as Nathan Levy, Bill's prospective boss at a new university
- Ken Cheeseman as Jimmy Fuller, a rival drug dealer of Brady's
- Maggie Siff as Rabbi Renannah Zimmerman
- Josh Pais as Ken Feinman
- Ty Burrell as Professor Sorenson
- Pruitt Taylor Vince as Big Joe Sharpe
- Randal Reeder as Shaver

== Soundtrack ==
The film featured the following songs:

1. "Stand Up" by Doug Bossi
2. "Illegal Smile" by John Prine
3. "My Wildest Dreams Grow Wilder Every Day" by The Flatlanders
4. "Faithful and True" by Richard Myhill
5. "Fat Man In The Bathtub" by Little Feat
6. "Rex's Blues" by Townes Van Zandt
7. "Sailin' Shoes" by Little Feat
8. "Sweet Revenge" by John Prine
9. "I Shall Be Released" by The Band
10. "Lonely Are The Free" by Steve Earle
11. "Boys From Oklahoma" by Cross Canadian Ragweed

== Release ==
The film premiered at the 2009 Toronto International Film Festival. Film critic Roger Ebert stated that he considered it his favorite of the festival. The film was not picked up for distribution at TIFF, so producer Avi Lerner planned to release it on April 2, 2010 through his own First Look Studios. This plan was abandoned on April 1 when Telepathic Studios gave Lerner enough funds to give the film a wider Summer 2010 release, due to positive reception at South by Southwest. For unknown reasons, this plan was also scrapped; ultimately, Leaves of Grass debuted theatrically on just six screens, grossing a little over $1 million worldwide.

DVD and Blu-ray versions of the film were released on October 12, 2010, and an extended edition is sold exclusively on Blu-ray with an additional 46 minutes of content.

=== Critical response ===
Leaves of Grass received mixed reviews from film critics, with praise being given to Norton's dual performance. Rotten Tomatoes reports that 63% of 40 critics gave the film a positive review, with an average score of 5.66/10. The website's critical consensus states that "Edward Norton delivers one of his finest performances in Leaves of Grass, but he's overpowered by the movie's many jarring tonal shifts." Metacritic, assigned the film a weighted average score of 58 out of 100, based on reviews from 10 critics, indicating "mixed or average" reviews.

"Leaves of Grass has the structure and the elements of a classical Greek drama: There's treachery, mistaken identity, deadly plots, and ambition; that it takes place in the middle of Oklahoma is almost irrelevant", said Paul Constant. Roger Ebert gave the film four out of four stars, and stated that "Tim Blake Nelson's Leaves of Grass is some kind of sweet, wacky masterpiece. It takes all sorts of risks, including a dual role with Edward Norton playing twin brothers, and it pulls them off." He closed his review with "Here's a quote for the video box: 'One of the year's best!' No, Tim Blake Nelson...thank you." Gary Goldstein of the Los Angeles Times also gave a positive review, particularly praising that "Edward Norton turns in not just one but two terrific performances in "Leaves of Grass," an offbeat thriller that is deepened — rather than derailed — by its tricky shift from darkly funny to just plain dark." He also praised Richard Dreyfuss, Susan Sarandon, and Josh Pais for their performances. Neil Genzlinger of The New York Times gave it an "NYT Critics' Pick", and particular praised the actors, saying "Mr. Norton is a pleasure to watch, and so is everyone else." He also approved of how the "film keeps you deliciously off-balance: it's funny and unnerving at the same time." Lisa Schwarzbaum of Entertainment Weekly stated that "the movie bubbles with intellectual curiosity and narrative ambition. And for that I dig it, even if Leaves of Grass has the habit of swerving and sometimes lurching from tone to tone." She praised the acting of Norton and Keri Russell. On an A to F scale, she gave the film a B+.

The film was not without its detractors. Dennis Harvey of Variety stated that "Nelson's script isn't blackly comic or deep enough to successfully accommodate the introduction of jarring violence," and criticized the subplot of Pais' character, Dreyfuss' performance, and the "perfunctory" romance between Norton and Russell. He strongly praised Norton's acting, stating that his dual-role "is very much the main attraction, and reward, of 'Leaves of Grass.'", and also praised Nelson's acting, stating that "Nelson himself provides the most valuable support in the colorful if variable cast." Rex Reed of New York Observer was extremely critical, particularly of Nelson, saying "It's just another oblique backfire from Tim Blake Nelson, whose work as a writer-director in general wallows in a bog of mediocrity" and that "Nelson, a cornball actor at best, is over the top as a larcenous Pa Kettle of a redneck sidekick." He finished his review stating that "The mirror-has-two-faces-idea is nothing new. From Bette Davis in Dead Ringer to Sam Rockwell in Moon, dozens of seasoned actors have lit each other's cigarettes while the audience thinks it's seeing double, and they've done it in much better pictures than this one. In Leaves of Grass, it seems irrelevant and recycled—essentially nothing more than a gimmick that wears out fast." He gave the film a rating of two out of four.
