= Wendy Edwards =

American painter

- Born: 1950 (age 75–76); Falls Church, Virginia, United States
- Education: University of New Mexico, University of the Arts (Philadelphia)
- Known for: Painting, works on paper
- Spouse: Jerry Mischak
- Children: Georgia Mischak (b. 1985)
- Website: Wendy V. Edwards

Wendy Edwards, Urchin, oil on canvas, 60" x 48", 2013.

Wendy Edwards (born 1950) is an American artist known for vibrant, tactile paintings rooted in organic forms and landscape, which have ranged from representation and figuration to free-form abstraction. Her work has been strongly influenced by the 1970s Pattern and Decoration movement and its embrace of ornamentation, repetition, edge-to-edge composition, sensuality and a feminist vision grounded in women's life experience. Critics note in Edwards's paintings an emphasis on surfaces and the materiality of paint, a rhythmic use of linear or geometric elements, and an intuitive orientation toward action, response and immediacy rather than premeditation. In a 2020 review, Boston Globe critic Cate McQuaid wrote, "Edwards's pieces are exuberant, edgy, and thoughtful ... [her] sweet, tart colors and delicious textures make the senses a gateway into larger notions about women and men, creation and mortality."

Edwards has exhibited at venues including the Dallas Museum of Fine Arts, Boston Center for the Arts, China National Academy of Painting, and Soviet Hall of Art. Her work belongs to the collections of the Philadelphia Museum of Art, Rhode Island School of Design Museum (RISD), San Antonio Museum of Art, Pennsylvania Academy of the Fine Arts, Bowdoin College Museum of Art and Karamay Museum (China), among others. She lives and works in Rhode Island with her husband, painter-sculptor Jerry Mischak.

== Life and career ==
Edwards was born in 1950 in Falls Church, Virginia, and spent much of her childhood outdoors on a farm near Washington, DC. She took art classes taught by Sam Gilliam at the Corcoran School of Art while in high school, before studying painting at the University of the Arts (Philadelphia) (BFA, 1972), where she was influenced by instructors such as Cynthia Carlson, Lily Yeh and Larry Day. During graduate studies at the University of New Mexico (MA, 1974), the dramatic southwestern landscape and light and the plein-air landscapist Charles Field made an impact on her work.

Between 1975 and 1981, Edwards appeared in group shows at the Museum of New Mexico, San Antonio Museum of Art, Dallas Museum of Fine Arts, Renaissance Society (Chicago), and Madison Art Center, and had solo exhibitions at the Stables Art Center (Taos) and Dart Gallery (Chicago), among others. She served as an assistant art professor at the University of Wisconsin-Madison from 1978 to 1980 before moving to the east coast in 1980 for an art professor position at Brown University, becoming the first woman hired and tenured in studio art. She served there, including terms as department chair, until retiring in 2020; during that period, she also taught for several summers at the Pont-Aven School of Art in France. In her later career, Edwards has exhibited at the RISD Museum, Russell Janis Gallery (New York), OH+T Gallery (Boston), and Mystic Museum of Art, among others. In 2019, a 40-year retrospective of her work, "Luscious," was presented at the David Winton Bell Gallery at Brown University.

== Work and reception ==
Edwards has generally worked in painting series that move between representation (still life, landscape, or figure) and abstraction and respond to life events (gender relations and sexuality, motherhood, mortality, travel), locale, and the physical and manipulative possibilities of her materials. Her paintings often bear referential and provocative titles, evoking double entendres or sexual innuendo. In addition to the Pattern and Decoration movement, her influences include artists such as Eva Hesse, Ree Morton, Elizabeth Murray and Pat Steir. Edwards has also produced drawings throughout her career, using graphite, charcoal, watercolor, inks and dyes, monoprint, and primarily, layered pastels that employ optically intermixed hues like Impressionist and Post-Impressionist work.

Wendy Edwards, Georgia Peach, oil on canvas, 80" x 72", 1989.

=== Early work ===
Edwards's work in the 1970s and 1980s included abstracted landscapes, formally constructed compositions mingling Imagist funk and New York School abstraction, and loose, representational work that addressed sexual self-definition from a feminist perspective combining humor and explicitness. Her mid-1970s landscapes were expressive, rough geometric interpretations of her Taos surroundings; a decade later, she returned to landscape after a trip to China, painting craggy mountaintops and lush river valleys with tilting perspectives and intruding abstract circles. Her late-1970s paintings employed idiosyncratic, crudely painted symbols and motifs arranged in succinct modernist structures and rendered with thick impasto surfaces, rhythmic brushstrokes, and calligraphic marks recording gesture and movement. By that time, she incorporated the use of extruded paint from pastry tubes into her work, creating thick squiggly shapes that played off more painterly passages and glazed fields; this technique came to the fore in her later "Net" and "Veil" series.

In the early 1980s, Edwards turned to figuration that shared qualities with German Expressionism, Matisse and color field artists: lushly textured and hued paintings whose misty atmospheric spaces were occupied by cartoon-like, cropped and overblown body parts (couplings, breasts, vaginas, penises) that functioned as abstract shapes as much as images. Later in the decade, she shifted from overtly sexual to sensual depictions that writers described as monumental, unabashed cutaway views of fruit and other forms, "ripe with the charm of feminine fertility symbols" and painted in "roundhouse strokes" and "high-voltage" lipstick reds and pinks and citrus yellows. These paintings often consisted of initial forms that doubled as abstracted genitalia (e.g., Georgia Peach and Pomegranate, both 1989) or gave way to expanding and concentric, erratic undulations, as in the largely white-on-white Oyster. Critics related this work to early modernists who explored boundaries between still life and abstraction (e.g., Georgia O'Keeffe, Arthur Dove and Marsden Hartley) and to the athletic action painting of artists like Willem de Kooning.

Wendy Edwards, Mounting, oil on canvas, 78" x 72", 2019.

=== Later work ===
Edwards's later production includes three bodies of work: smaller canvases of concentric rectangles that writers connected to Josef Albers's "Homage to the Square" series; the longer-running "Nets" and "Veils" works, begun in 2001; and flower-motif works initially based on "doodles," which sometimes employ collage, starting in the later 2000s. A representative work from the former series is Lucky Charm (1999), which consisted of yellow and ochre, expanding rectangular bands and dabs of slithering, extruded paint with a glowing center of pale blue squibs.

The "Nets" paintings are layered works that Edwards began with large, looping swirls of wet underpainting applied with a rag or wide brush, over which she squeezed out stringy extrusions of rounded paint lines using pastry tools; the fragile, sometimes breaking tendrils seem to knot briefly at intersections and expand or contract across surfaces, suggesting latticeworks, webs, veils or fishnets undulating underwater (e.g., Mermaid, 2004). The delicate patterns and jewel-like surfaces create contrasts involving surface, form, depth and embellishment as they separate from or blend into more powerful background strokes. Thematically, the paintings explore contrary notions of exposure and coverage, containment, and seepage. In subsequent net paintings, Edwards introduced vase-like forms as metaphorical stand-ins for the female body (Gathered, 2011; Urchin, 2013).

In the latter 2000s, Edwards began incorporating flower-like doodles into her compositions as loose patterns, for example, outlining gray-blue forms over the pure orange color field of Wake Up (2007). She painted more voluminous floral abstractions in subsequent works (Dreamboat, 2013), some of them nestled together like scoops of ice cream or in larger networks, as in Tipper (2012), which incorporated squirmy, yellow cut and collaged fragments from a Mexican oilcloth. In later works, Edwards employed a greater degree of color-containing lines and abstraction, suggesting the influence of Van Gogh's flower paintings, as in Mounting (2019), which consists of blue and violet iris petal that seem to tumble onto a field swiped with large, loose lemon-lime arcs.
