= Maggie Siff =

American actress (born 1974)

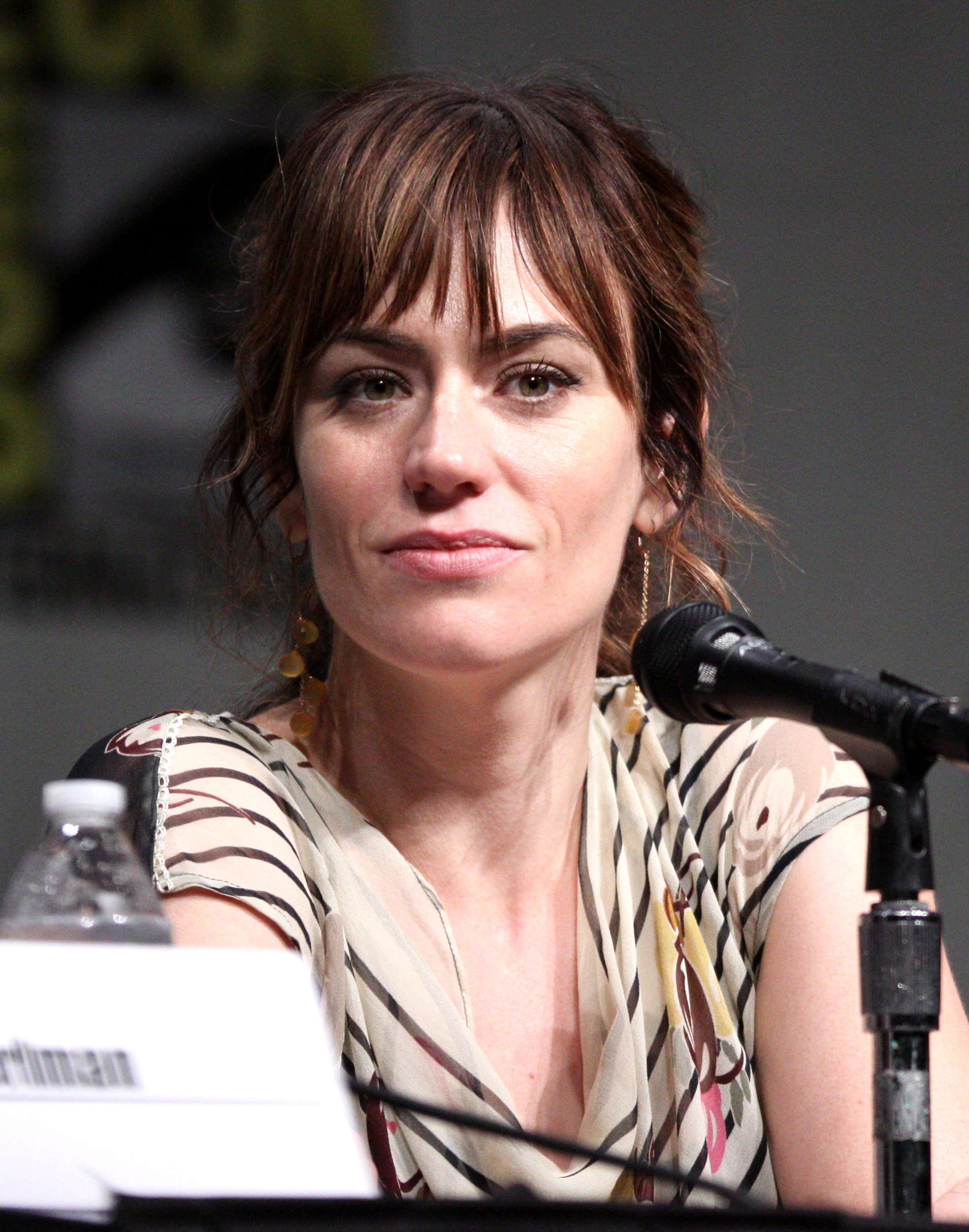
- Siff at the 2012 San Diego Comic-Con
- Born: Margaret Siff; June 21, 1974 (age 52)
- Education: Bryn Mawr College (BA); New York University (MFA)
- Occupation: Actress
- Years active: 2004–present
- Spouse: Paul Ratliff (m. 2012; died 2021)
- Children: 1

Maggie Siff (born June 21, 1974) is an American actress. Her most notable television roles have included department store heiress Rachel Menken Katz on the AMC drama Mad Men, Dr. Tara Knowles on the FX drama Sons of Anarchy for which she was twice nominated for the Critics' Choice Television Award for Best Supporting Actress in a Drama Series, and psychiatrist Wendy Rhoades on the Showtime series Billions.

She has also had roles in the films Push (2009) as Teresa Stowe, and Leaves of Grass (2010) as Rabbi Renannah Zimmerman. She starred in the independent film A Woman, a Part (2016) and had a minor role in the drama film One Percent More Humid (2017). She is the television spokesperson for the robo-advisor service Betterment.

== Early life and education ==
Siff is an alumna of The Bronx High School of Science and of Bryn Mawr College, where she majored in English and graduated in 1996. She later completed an M.F.A. in acting at New York University's Tisch School of the Arts, graduating in 2004. Shortly after graduating, Siff also worked as a temp at a hedge fund, an experience she drew on for her role in Billions.

Siff worked extensively in regional theater before acting in television. She won a Barrymore Award for Excellence in Theater in 1998 for her work in Henrik Ibsen's Ghosts at Lantern Theater Company.

Born to a father of Ashkenazi Jewish descent who was also a stage actor, Siff has stated that she feels “culturally Jewish because of how and where I grew up."

== Career ==
Siff started appearing in television series in 2004. She appeared as an Alcoholics Anonymous speaker during an episode of Rescue Me in Season 2. She also had roles on Law & Order: Special Victims Unit, Grey's Anatomy, and Law & Order.

She played Rachel Menken Katz on the series Mad Men from 2007 to 2008, which earned her a nomination, along with the rest of the cast, for a Screen Actors Guild Award for Outstanding Performance by an Ensemble in a Drama Series. She also appeared in a small role as a burn victim on Nip/Tuck during that time, before being cast as Dr. Tara Knowles on Sons of Anarchy in 2008.

She has appeared in such films as Then She Found Me (2007) as Lily, Push as a psychic surgeon (called a Stitch) named Teresa Stowe, sent to help Nick (played by Chris Evans), Funny People (2009) as Rachel, Leaves of Grass (2010) as Rabbi Renannah Zimmerman, and Concussion (2013) as Sam Bennet. She appears in the 2016 Showtime series Billions. She starred in an independent indie film called A Woman, A Part (2016) as well as One Percent More Humid (2017).

In 2017, she narrated the audio book Gwendy's Button Box by Stephen King and Richard Chizmar and the sequel Gwendy's Magic Feather by Chizmar.

Starting in 2018, she has been serving as the television spokesperson for Betterment, an online investment service.

In 2020, Siff provided the voice for the titular subject of "Polly Platt: The Invisible Woman", over the course of a season of Karina Longworth’s film history podcast You Must Remember This.

In 2026, Siff made her West End debut playing Joy Davidman in Shadowlands at the Aldwych Theatre.

== Personal life ==
In October 2013, Siff announced that she was expecting her first child with husband, Paul Ratliff, whom she married in 2012. Siff gave birth to a daughter, Lucy. Siff's husband died in 2021 of brain cancer.

== Filmography ==
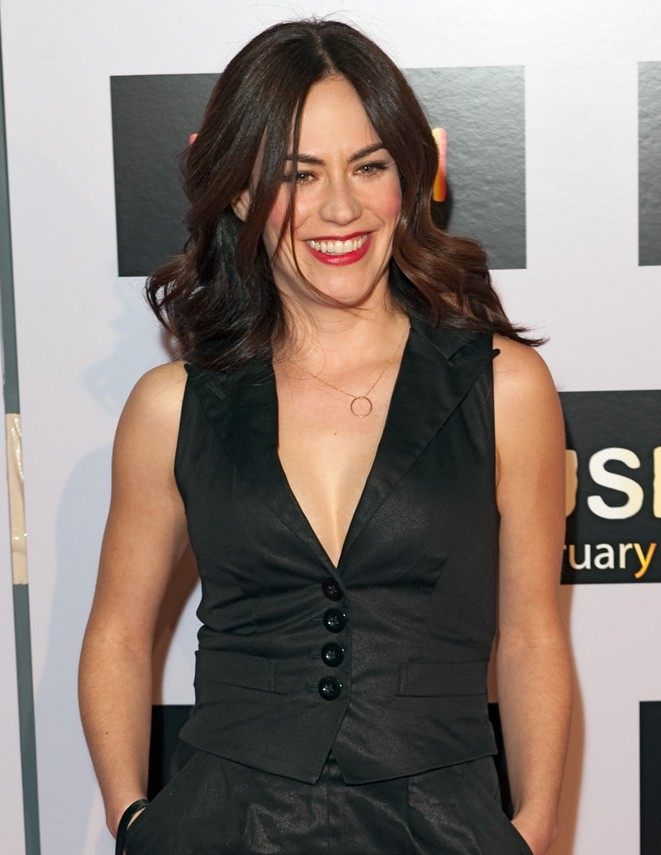
Siff at the premiere of Push in January 2009

=== Film ===
Year	Title	Role	Notes
2007	Michael Clayton	Attorney #1	
2007	Then She Found Me	Lily	
2009	Push	Teresa Stowe	
2009	Leaves of Grass	Rabbi Renannah Zimmerman	
2009	Funny People	Rachel	
2013	Concussion	Sam Bennet	
2016	The 5th Wave	Lisa Sullivan	
2016	A Woman, a Part	Anna Baskin	Also executive producer
2016	The Sweet Life	Ava	
2017	One Percent More Humid	Lisette	
2019	The Short History of the Long Road	Cheryl	

=== Television ===
Year	Title	Role	Notes
2004	Third Watch	Cindy	Episode: "Obsession"
2005	Rescue Me	Young Woman at AA	Episode: "Twat"
2006	Law & Order: Special Victims Unit	Emily McCooper	Episode: "Gone"
2006	3 lbs.	Lisa Kutchem	Episode: "The God Spot"
2007	Grey's Anatomy	Ruthie Sales	Episode: "The Heart of the Matter"
2007–2008, 2015	Mad Men	Rachel Menken Katz	Main role (season 1), guest role (seasons 2 and 7)
2007–2008	Nip/Tuck	Rachel Ben Natan	3 episodes
2008	Law & Order	Attorney Mahaffey	Episode: "Executioner"
2008–2013	Sons of Anarchy	Tara Knowles	Main role (seasons 1–6)
2009	Life on Mars	Maria Belanger	3 episodes
2011	A Gifted Man	Lily	Episode: "In Case of Letting Go"
2016–2023	Billions	Wendy Rhoades	Main role
2019	Explained	Narrator	Episode: "Billionaires"
2025	Law & Order	Kate Norris	Episode: "Crossing Lines"
