= David Winton Bell Gallery =

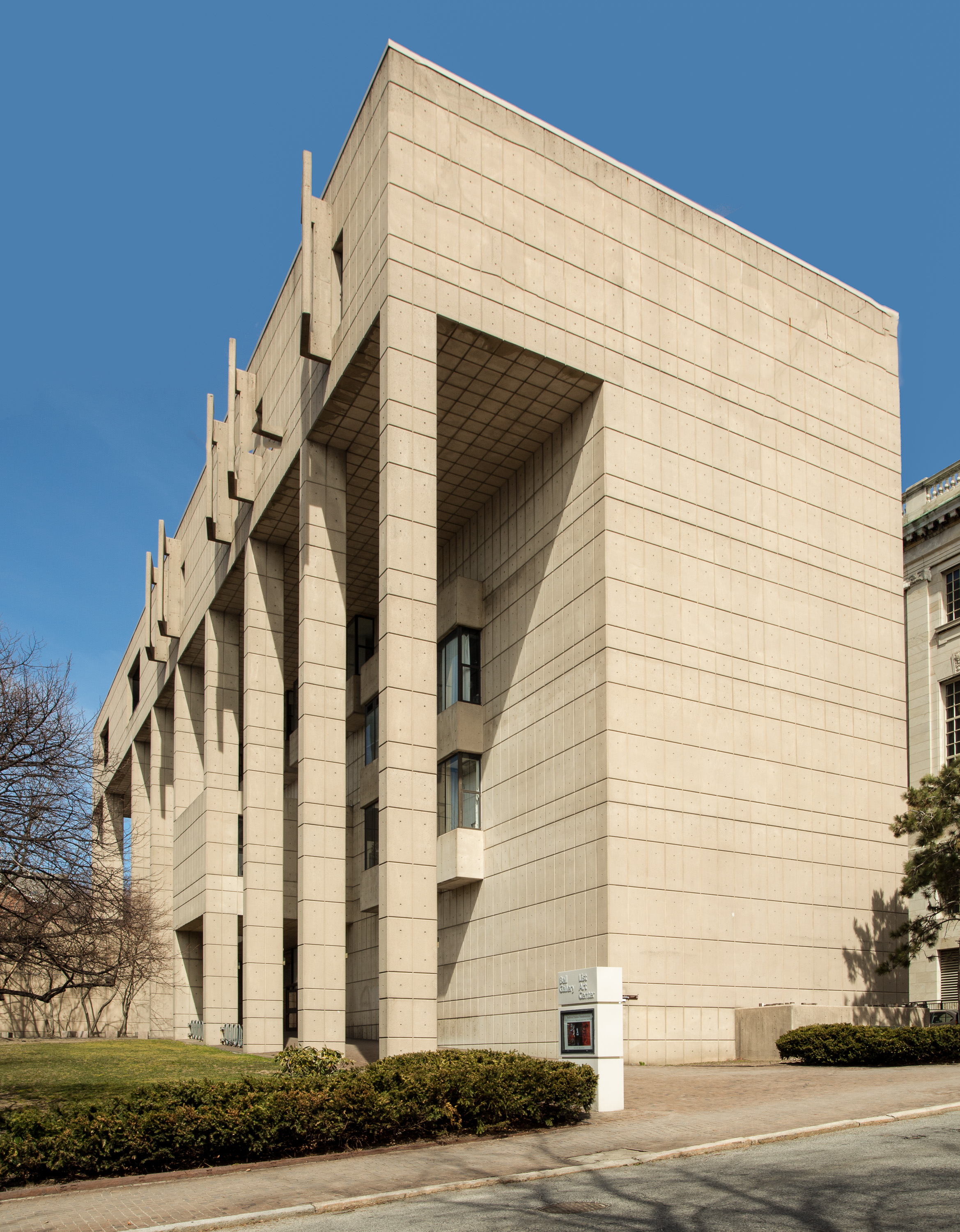
- Established: 1971; 54 years ago
- Location: Providence, Rhode Island
- Coordinates: 41.82635°N 71.40541°W
- Collection size: 7,000
- Website: https://bell.brown.edu/

The David Winton Bell Gallery is a contemporary art gallery at Brown University in Providence, Rhode Island. The gallery was established in 1971 through a donation from the Bell family. The Bell Gallery serves as a hub of contemporary art within the university community and beyond, offering a diverse range of exhibitions, programs, and events. It is housed in the Albert and Vera List Art Center, and is part of the Brown Arts Institute.

Each year, the gallery features four to five major shows, as well as dozens of student exhibitions. Recent exhibitions have featured work by Elisabeth Subrin, Lisa Reihana, Melvin Edwards, Wendy Edwards, and Carrie Mae Weems.

== Collection ==
The Bell Gallery's permanent collection consists of more than 7,000 artworks. Highlights of the collection include works by Lee Bontecou, Alice Neel, Frank Stella, Jules Olitski, and Walker Evans.
