= Jason Middlebrook (artist) =

American visual artist (born 1966)

- Born: 1966 (age 59–60); Jackson, Michigan, US
- Education: San Francisco Art Institute; Univ. of California, Santa Cruz; Whitney Independent Study Prog.
- Known for: Public art, plank sculptures installation art, painting, drawing
- Awards: Joan Mitchell Foundation; Pollock-Krasner Foundation
- Website: Jason Middlebrook

Jason Middlebrook, Florida Sunset, Glass tile, mortar, and fiberglass mesh, 34' x 28', 2021, Tampa Bay International Airport.

Jason Middlebrook (born 1966) is an American visual artist whose work includes public art, installation, sculpture, drawing and painting. He is most known for public mural and mosaic projects, such as Brooklyn Seeds (2012, commissioned by MTA Arts & Design), and his body of "plank sculptures"—rough-hewn slabs of hardwood onto which he paints intricate, mainly abstract patterns. His art explores relationships between the natural and human-made environments, merging geometric abstraction and organic materials and motifs, as well as conceptualism and craftsmanship.

Middlebrook's art belongs to the collections of the Museum of Modern Art, New Museum, Whitney Museum, Museum of Fine Arts, Boston, and Museum of Contemporary Art Chicago, among others. He has exhibited at the latter four venues, MASS MoCA, Site Santa Fe and the Buffalo AKG Art Museum. After being based in Brooklyn, Middlebrook lives and works in Hudson, New York.

== Life and career ==
Middlebrook was born in Jackson, Michigan in 1966. He spent his formative years amid the counterculture of Northern California. In 1990 he graduated from the University of California, Santa Cruz with a BFA. He earned an MFA from San Francisco Art Institute in 1994 before moving to New York, where he attended the Whitney Independent Study Program (1994–95).

Middlebrook has had solo exhibitions at institutions including the New Museum, Santa Monica Museum of Art, The Contemporary Austin, MASS MoCA, SCAD Museum of Art, and Moss Arts Center (Virginia Tech). Gallery exhibitions have taken place at Margo Leavin (Los Angeles), DODGE and Miles McEnery in New York, and Monique Meloche (Chicago). He has appeared in group shows at the Whitney Museum, Institute of Contemporary Art, Boston, and Orange County Museum of Art, among other venues.

== Work and reception ==
=== Public art projects ===
Middlebrook's site-specific public projects—which include works in paint, sculpture and mosaic—engage with nuances of nature, place and architectural space. His wall painting Traveling Seeds (2009) was commissioned by Rx Art for the bone marrow transplant unit at Mount Sinai Medical Center and described by The New York Times as "a symbol of hope and regeneration." The work depicts flowers and germinating, wind-blown seeds on the hospital's walls and columns as a metaphor for the potential of bone marrow to give patients new life.

Jason Middlebrook, Dividing My Time, Acrylic on elm, 98.25" x 26.5" x 1", 2017.

In several mosaic projects, Middlebrook extended that visual theme, exploring diverse plants and wildlife at larger-than-life scale in order to emphasize their importance to the specific regions of each commission. Brooklyn Seeds (2011, MTA Brooklyn) stages a monumental garden of delicate flowers and airborne seedpods that climbs a stair wall from Avenue U to an elevated train platform; Middlebrook chose local wildflowers (burdock, goldenrod, aster, milkweed) that thrive in unlikely urban spaces like alleys, walls and cracks in sidewalks. Growing in the Mobile Delta (2018) comprises eight vibrant glass mosaics depicting delta flowers of varying color and shape that were integrated into the classical architecture of the Mobile (Alabama) Federal Building & Courthouse lobby. The immersive, 952-square-foot mosaic Florida Sunset (2021, Tampa International Airport) celebrates the area's biodiversity with oversize imagery of ten species including native flowers, insects and a snowy egret. Middlebrook's series of 17 mosaics for the University of Nebraska Omaha's Durham Science Center (2024) focuses on the center's five disciplines (chemistry, astronomy, math, geography and geology), juxtaposing imagery of the atom, Milky Way and Golden Ratio with regional features such as Nebraska windmills and Chimney Rock.

Middlebrook's public projects also include sculptural and architectural works. Underlife (2012–13) is a monumental, tentacle-like outdoor sculpture in steel, fiberglass and tile created in response to the Frederick Law Olmsted–designed landscape surrounding the Buffalo AKG Museum campus. Animated by glittering glass, it resembles the complex root system of a tree displaced from its natural, underground state, looming aboveground and exposed as a representation of the life force and underbelly of nature. Water Light (2017, Walnut Creek, California) combines an abstract mirror-tile mosaic composition, syncopated arcing fountain and hard-scape design with echoing forms that create a focal point for a pedestrian courtyard.

=== Plank sculptures ===
Middlebrook developed his plank sculptures after he moved to the Hudson River Valley in the mid-2000s and became fascinated by the surrounding forests and the notion of trees as records of compressed history. A visit to a sawmill led him to consider discarded burls as substrates for paintings. Begun in 2008, the planks use totemic sections of local hardwoods—some 20 feet high—as sculptural canvasses onto which he inscribes detailed abstract patterns in glossy, vivid industrial colors. Made of woods such as cherry, walnut, cottonwood, maple and elm—and generally leaned against the wall like John McCracken sculptures or surfboards—the planks have smooth, flat surfaces but often retain the organic shapes and craggy, bark-encrusted textures of their edges.

The planks balance a reverence for the found organic grain of the bare wood with the human desire to aesthetically mark or comment with forms that work with or against the grain. Their compositions range from hard-edged, mandala-like arrangements of straight, jagged or zigzagging lines that reference geometric abstractionists like Ellsworth Kelly, Sol LeWitt and Frank Stella (e.g., Dividing My Time, 2017) to cascades of sinuous waves inspired by the plank shapes, which recall the Op art of Bridget Riley (e.g., Black and White Number 2, 2011). In some cases, forms spread concentrically from natural cavities in the timber to suggest notions of geological duration and formation associated with geodes and tree rings (e.g., Geode Plank, 2011; Keep Digging, 2013).

Jason Middlebrook, Underlife, Steel, fiberglass, glass tile and grout, 180" x 540" x 276", 2013–14, Buffalo AKG Art Museum.

=== Drawings, sculpture and installations ===
Art in America critic Lilly Wei characterized Middlebrook's earlier work as "playfully earnest and visually provocative," with "persistent themes [of] nature v. culture, repurposing throwaways, runaway consumption and its impact on the environment." It often centered on quasi-narrative, dystopian sculptures and drawings that portrayed architectural and cultural icons (e.g., Getty Center, 2001; Capit L Records Building, 2005) succumbing to the ravages of time, disaster, abandonment or overgrown nature. For example, the installation Dig (2002) was a cross-sectional layer of faux topsoil and plants that seemed to colonize a stairwell at the New Museum.

In several subsequent projects, Middlebrook relied on recycled materials. The exhibition "Live with Less" (2009, University of Albany Art Museum) used cardboard discards collected on campus and was anchored by Cardboard Stack, a 35-foot-high, tornado-like column consisting of two tons of the flattened material. Falling Water (2013, MASS MoCA; titled after the famed Frank Lloyd Wright house) was a giant indoor waterfall made of rock-like chunks of abandoned Styrofoam discovered on site. For the SCAD Museum's 86-foot-high lobby, Middlebrook created Submerged (2014), a structure resembling a medieval chandelier made of 77 locally sourced ends of logs reclaimed from the Savannah River pier system.

== Collections and other recognition ==
Middlebrook's work belongs to the public art collections of the Addison Gallery of American Art, Buffalo AKG Art Museum, Denver Art Museum, Harn Museum, Institute of Contemporary Art, Boston, Museum of Contemporary Art Chicago, Museum of Fine Arts, Boston, Museum of Modern Art, Museo Marte (El Salvador), NASA Art Program, New Museum, Pizzuti Collection, Princeton University Art Museum, U.S. Department of State, and Whitney Museum, among others. He has been awarded grants from the Joan Mitchell Foundation and Pollock-Krasner Foundation and an IASPIS Residency by the Swedish Arts International Programme.
