= Brattleboro Museum and Art Center =

Brattleboro Museum & Art Center
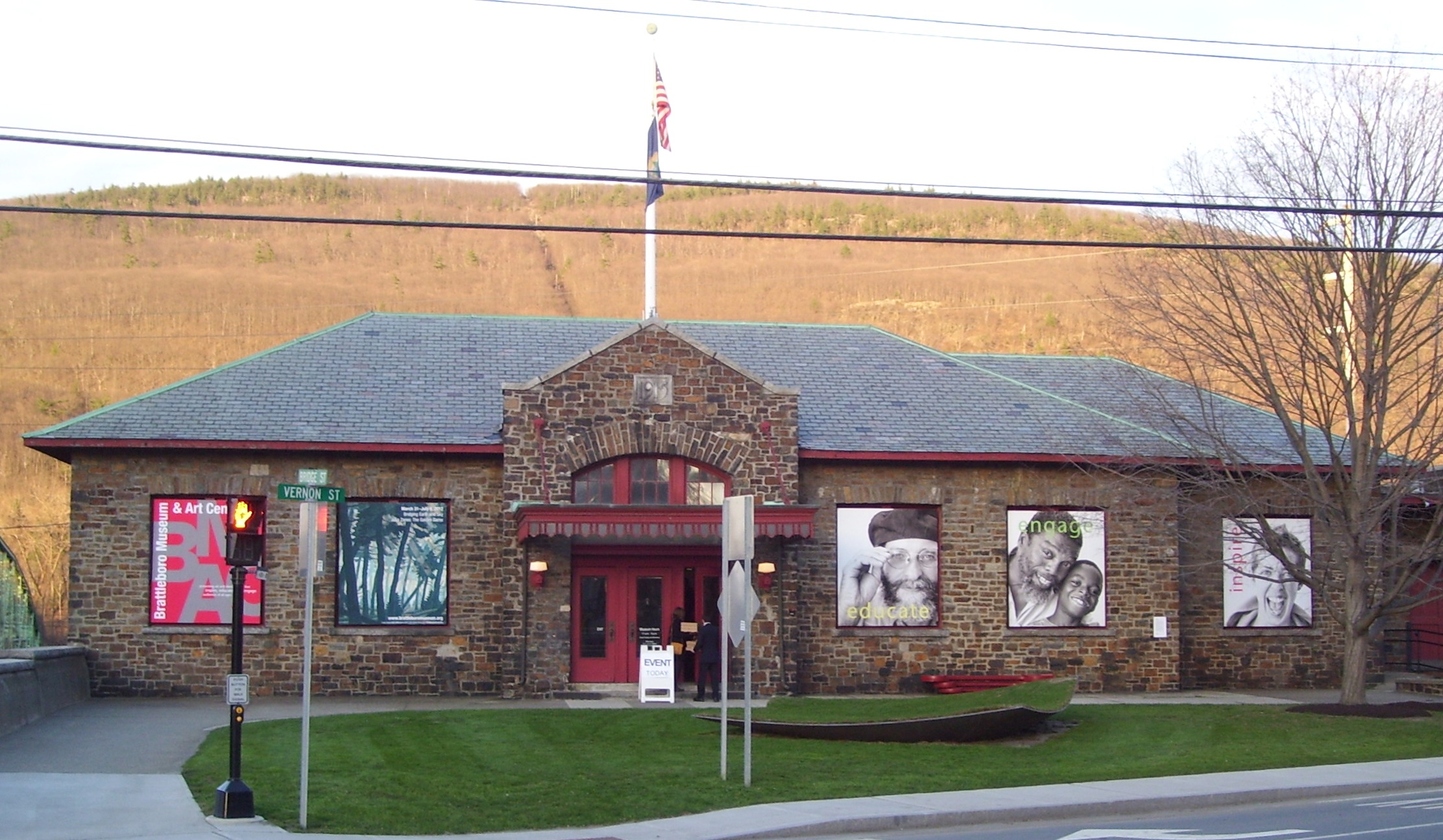
- Established: 1972
- Location: 10 Vernon Street; Brattleboro, Vermont
- Coordinates: 42°51′03″N 72°33′24″W
- Type: Art museum
- Executive director: Danny Lichtenfeld
- President: Christina Herbert
- Website: brattleboromuseum.org
- Union Station
- U.S. National Register of Historic Places
- Built: 1915; 111 years ago
- NRHP reference No.: 74000268
- Added to NRHP: June 6, 1974

The Brattleboro Museum and Art Center (BMAC), a non-collecting museum, was founded in 1972 and is located in the former Central Vermont & Boston & Maine Union Station building in downtown Brattleboro, Vermont.

New exhibits by regional and international artists are shown each season. The aim of BMAC is to present art and ideas in ways that inspire, educate, and engage people of all ages. Some of BMAC's notable exhibiting artists have included Jennifer Bartlett, Chuck Close, Janet Fish, Emily Mason, Wolf Kahn, Chris Van Allsburg and Andy Warhol. The BMAC's space also serves as community center.

== History ==
During the 1970s, the museum was run by a group of volunteers, but in 1981 the first professional director, W. Ron Foulds was hired to run the museum. The museum curates various exhibitions aimed at the general public as well as local school groups and other community organizations. Educational programs for lifelong learning and significant school programs are also conducted by museum staff and volunteers. Brattleboro Museum and Art Center participates in Brattleboro's Gallery Walk on the first Friday of every month.

== Building ==
The building was constructed in 1915 out of quartzite rubble which was mined locally from across the Connecticut River in New Hampshire. The original train station, built in 1849, was located across the tracks on the east side, just west of the river. The upper floor and former baggage area of the station converted into a museum in the 1970s.

From the museum's founding in 1972 until June 2026, the former baggage area on the lower track level of the building was utilized as a passenger waiting room for Amtrak's Brattleboro station. This use ceased when Amtrak transitioned operations to a newly constructed, standalone station across the tracks.

In 2019, the museum announced a 30 million dollar expansion project that would construct a second, larger exhibition space on an adjacent property.
