= William McKeown =

Northern Irish artist (1962–2011)

- Born: 15 April 1962; County Tyrone, Northern Ireland
- Died: 25 October 2011 (aged 49); Edinburgh

William McKeown (15 April 1962 – 25 October 2011) was a Northern Irish painter, watercolourist, and draughtsman.

== Life ==
McKeown was born to a Presbyterian family in County Tyrone. He was brought up on a farm which remained an inspiration throughout his artistic life. In 1980–81, he studied Art History at the University College, London. In 1984, he graduated in Textile Design at Central School of Art & Design, London. In 1987, he graduated with an MA in Design from Glasgow School of Art.

McKeown worked at the Ulster Folk and Transport Museum, demonstrating weaving techniques. He then moved to Dublin in 1988 and worked at the Kerlin Gallery until 1991. In 1994, he graduated with a Masters in Fine Art at the University of Ulster in Belfast. The Kerlin Gallery presented his first solo show in 1996.

McKeown was a board member of Temple Bar Gallery and Studios (2002–2005, at the time he had a studio there) and the Douglas Hyde Gallery (2002–2005). From September 2004, he was in residence in the Old Convent in Lismore for one year. In 2006, he moved to Edinburgh. He died in Edinburgh at the age of 49.

== Work ==
His abstract paintings (initially on canvas, then on linen) went from monochrome to subtle gradations of tone, which became more gestural, pulsating or woven. His work had connections with certain aspects of minimalist, post-minimalist, post-painterly and conceptual art. His luminous paintings explore states of mind, such as happiness and freedom, and qualities of nature, like light, air and sky. He also made small realistic coloured pencil drawings of the wildflowers typical of his home county (primrose, snowdrop, buttercup), always against stark blank paper. He particularly admired the work of Agnes Martin.

His sensitivity for light, colour, and textiles transferred into his highly considered constructions or rooms (such as Nest (The Bravery of Birds) for the Venice Biennale in 2005).

A sense of place was often conveyed in the titles of his work, which referenced birds (The Corncrake, Starlings), wildlife, the countryside of his childhood (The Meadow, The Lane, The Hayfield), cities (Hope Painting - Abercromby Place, 2006, Arts Council of Ireland collection) and the weather (Cloud Painting, Raining).

His attention to detail in the installation of his work led him occasionally to create rooms or constructions for their display. In situ installations were set up with great precision.

=== Exhibitions ===
His first solo exhibition was "In An Open Room", at the Douglas Hyde Gallery, Dublin, 2001. This came towards the end of his 18-month residency at the Old Convent at Lismore, Waterford.

Other solo exhibitions included; “The Sky Begins Art Our Feet”, Ormeau Baths Gallery, Belfast, 2002; “The Room At the Horizon”, Project Arts Centre, Dublin, 2004, “Cloud Cuckoo Land”, Dublin and Edinburgh, 2004; Irish Museum of Modern Art, Dublin, 2008; “Five Working Days”, Ormeau Baths Gallery, Belfast, 2010 and “The Waiting Room” for the Golden Bough project at the Dublin City Gallery at Hugh Lane in 2011.

Two-person exhibitions include “Pool”, a collaboration with Dorothy Cross at Kerlin Gallery, Dublin, 2010; “A Certain Distance, Endless Light” with Félix Gonzáles-Torres, Middlesbrough Museum of Modern Art, curated by Gavin Delahunty in 2010.

In 2005, William McKeown was invited to represent Northern Ireland at the 51st Venice Biennale, in the exhibition “The Nature of Things” curated by Hugh Mulholland.

Other group exhibitions include East International, Norwich, selected by Tacita Dean and Nicholas Logsdail, 1997; “A Measured Quietude”, The Drawing Center, New York and Berkeley Art Museum, California, 1999; “The Sea & The Sky”, Royal Hibernian Academy, Dublin and Beaver College of Art Gallery, Philadelphia, curated by Patrick T. Murphy and Richard Torchia, 2000; “Rooms For Waiting In”, Galway Arts Centre, curated by Michael Dempsey, 2005; “A Dream of Discipline” with Dorothy Cross and Kathy Prendergast, Douglas Hyde Gallery, Dublin, 2006; and All Flowers in Time Bend Towards the Sun at The Coach House, Dublin Castle, curated by Paul Hallahan and Lee Welch, 2025.

Paul Nesbitt curated a solo exhibition of McKeown's work at Inverleith House, Royal Botanical Gardens, Edinburgh, in May 2012.

=== The Holiday Show ===
William McKeown curated "The Holiday Show" at the Royal Hibernian Academy, Dublin, in 2002, presenting work by Maureen Gallace, Darragh Hogan, Isabel Nolan, Gavin O'Curry, Stuart Purdy, Anne Ryan and Andrew Vickery. In the accompanying catalogue, he wrote: "There are two types of art - open and closed. All closed art is negative and anti-life. Art which is open accepts without judgement, is expanding, positive and life enhancing."

== Awards ==
McKeown won an award for the Sirius Project in Co. Cork in 2001. He won the Arts Council of Northern Ireland Award the following year.

McKeown became a member of Aosdána (an association of artists established by the Arts Council of Ireland) in 2008.

== Publications ==
William McKeown. The Sky Begins At Our Feet, Belfast, Ormeau Baths, 2002. Text by Isabel Nolan.

William McKeown, Dublin, Irish Museum of Modern Art / Milan, Charta, 2008. Texts by Chris Arthur, Caroline Hancock, Enrique Juncosa, Corinna Lotz, Declan Long; and poems by Dominic Echlin and William Wordsworth.

== Film ==
In 2016, his work was the subject of a short film by Pat Collins, entitled Idir Neamh agus Talamh: Saothar William McKeown.
