= Declan Long =

Declan Long is an Irish art critic and lecturer specialising in contemporary art made in ‘Post-Troubles’ Northern Ireland.

== Career ==
Declan Long is the programme director of the MA course 'Art in the Contemporary World' at the National College of Art & Design, Dublin, Ireland.

He frequently appears on Arena on RTÉ Radio 1, discussing and reviewing contemporary art. His criticism is regularly published in Artforum, Frieze, and Source Photographic Review. In 2013 Long was a member of the judging panel for the Turner Prize and he is also a board member of the Douglas Hyde Gallery, Dublin.

He has written gallery texts for numerous exhibitions including: Willie Doherty (for Alexander & Bonin, New York and Matt’s Gallery, London, 2012), Isabel Nolan (The Model, Sligo, and Le Musée d'art Moderne de Saint-Etienne, 2011), Jesse Jones (Project Arts Centre, 2011), Mamma Andersson (Douglas Hyde Gallery, 2009), Ulla Von Brandenburg (Irish Museum of Modern Art, 2009), Lothar Hempel (Douglas Hyde Gallery, 2008), William McKeown (Irish Museum of Modern Art, 2008), Fergus Feehily (Neuer Aachener Kunstverein, 2008), Clodagh Emoe, Nina Canell, and Linda Quinlan (for the exhibition 'Come Together' at the Douglas Hyde Gallery, 2007).

His 2017 book, Ghost-haunted Land: Contemporary Art and Post-troubles Northern Ireland, was described in The Irish Times as "a foundational work of art criticism that will stand alongside Colin Graham’s study of photography and the North as a first point of reference for anyone interested in the Troubles and their cultural legacies."

== Bibliography ==
- Long, Declan. Anois. Dublin: Temple Bar Gallery & Studios (2001). ISBN 9780951914694
- Long, Declan. Didymosphenia Geminata: Barrie Cooke. Dublin: Kerlin Gallery (2007). ISBN 9780953171774
- Long, Declan. Passage. Belfast: Golden Thread Gallery (2007). ISBN 9780954963392
- Long, Declan, and Beatrix Ruf. Ulla Von Brandenburg: Whose Beginning is Not, Nor End Cannot be. Dublin: Irish Museum of Modern Art (2008). ISBN 9788881586936
- Juncosa, Enrique; Lotz, Corinna; Long, Declan. William McKeown. Milan & Dublin: Charta/Irish Museum of Modern Art (2009). ISBN 9788881587155
- Long, Declan. Willie Doherty Photo/text/85/92. London & New York: Matt's Gallery & Alexander and Bonin (2012). ISBN 9780907623809
- Murray, Peter; Long, Declan. Mark Clare, I Believe in You. Cork: Crawford Art Gallery (2014). ISBN 9781874756217
- Packer, Matt; Long, Declan; Ricks, Jim. Here Comes The Summer. Derry: Centre for Contemporary Art Derry~Londonderry (2017).
- Long, Declan. Ghost-haunted Land: Contemporary Art and Post-troubles Northern Ireland. Manchester: Manchester University (2017). ISBN 9781784991449
- Long, Declan, Kelly Grovier, Rudi Fuchs, and Sean Scully. Sean Scully: Landlines and Other Recent Works. London: Cultureshock Media (2019). ISBN 9780957007086
