= Saddle (disambiguation) =

A saddle is a supportive structure for a rider or other load, fastened to an animal's back by a girth.

Saddle may also refer to:

== As a seat ==
- Bicycle saddle, the seat of a bicycle
- Motorcycle saddle, the seat of a motorcycle
- Saddle chair, an alternative to a regular chair

== Geography ==
- Saddle (landform), a low area between hills or mountains; a mountain pass
- The Saddle (Lochgoilhead), a mountain in Scotland

== Meteorology ==
- A saddle or col, the point of intersection of a trough and a ridge in the pressure pattern of a weather map

== Places ==
- Saddle, Arkansas, a community in the United States
- The Saddle (Garfield County, Colorado), a mountain pass in Garfield County, Colorado, United States.
- The Saddle (Larimer County, Colorado), a mountain pass in Larimer County, Colorado, United States.
- The Saddle (Montrose County, Colorado), a mountain pass in Montrose County, Colorado, United States.
- The Saddle, a mountain in Scotland

== Mathematics ==
- Saddle point, a point on a surface whose neighborhood resembles a saddle
- Monkey saddle, a mathematical surface defined by the equation $z = x^3 - 3xy^2$
- Sources and sinks, vectors field in a point that are neither of the two are sometimes called saddles.

== Other uses ==
- Saddle (artwork), a 1993 sculpture by Dorothy Cross
- Saddle, a cut of lamb
- Saddle, the bearing surface on the bridge of a stringed instrument
- Saddle, or cricket (roofing), a ridge structure on a chimney
- Saddle, a curved component at the top of a tower of a suspension bridge, upon which rests the bridge's cables.

== See also ==
- Saddleback (disambiguation)
- Saddler (disambiguation)
- Saddle tank (disambiguation)
- Lordosis, or saddle back, curvature of the spine
- Saddle bronc, a type of rodeo riding
- The Saddle Club, an Australian TV show and series of novels
- Saddle roof, a type of roof structure
- Saddle stitch, a form of book binding
- Worshipful Company of Saddlers, a London livery company
- Anomiidae, a family known as saddle oysters
- Saddle blanket, placed under a saddle
