= Victor Sloan =

Northern Irish photographer and artist (born 1945)

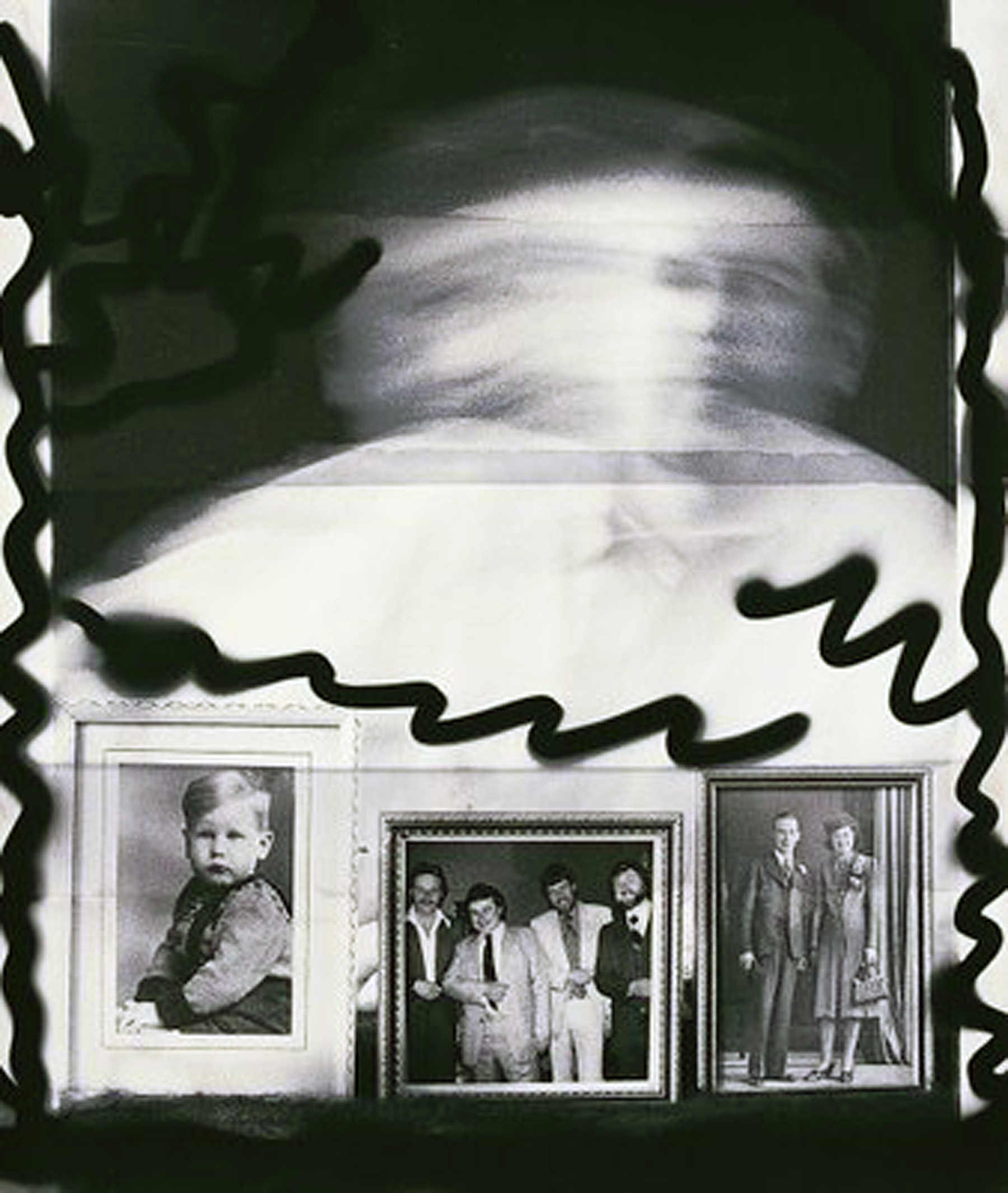
- "Self-Portrait", silver gelatin print, with coloured pencils, 60 cm x 50 cm, 1993
- Born: 16 July 1945 (age 80); Dungannon, County Tyrone, Northern Ireland
- Education: Belfast College of Art, Leeds College of Art and Design
- Known for: Photography, Video, Mixed Media
- Awards: MBE

Victor Sloan MBE (born 1945) is a Northern Irish photographer and artist.

== Life and work ==
Sloan was born in 1945 in Dungannon, County Tyrone, Northern Ireland. He studied at the Royal School, Dungannon, County Tyrone and Belfast and Leeds Colleges of Art, the latter in England. He lives and works in Portadown, County Armagh in Northern Ireland.

Employing primarily the medium of photography, he manipulates his negatives and reworks his prints with paints, inks, toners and dyes. In addition to photography, he also uses video, and printmaking techniques.

Sloan's works are a response to political, social and religious concerns. He is perhaps best known for his works investigating the Orange Order in series such as: Drumming; The Walk, the Platform and the Field and The Birches.

Sloan was awarded an MBE in 2002. He is an academician of the Royal Ulster Academy, a Fellow of the Royal Society of Arts, and a Fellow of the Royal Photographic Society. He won the Academy's Conor Prize in 1988 and the Gold Medal in 1995 and 2008.

The Ormeau Baths Gallery, Belfast held a major exhibition of his work (Victor Sloan: Selected Works 1980–2000) in 2001. In 2008, the exhibition History, Locality, Allegiance, curated by Peter Richards at the Golden Thread Gallery, Belfast, brought together a comprehensive selection of past works, with a particular focus on his video works.

His exhibition Victor Sloan: Drift, curated by Dr Riann Coulter, Curator of the F.E. McWilliam Gallery & Studio and Feargal O'Malley, Curator at the University of Ulster, explored a related though distinct area, tracing the story of the Vietnamese boat people who settled in Craigavon, Northern Ireland in 1979.

In preparation for this exhibition, Sloan rekindled his friendship with Ka Fue Lay, who was a teenager when he settled in Craigavon in 1979 and now lives in Salisbury, England. Sloan made a video in which Ka Fue Lay discusses his life in Vietnam, displays family photographs and fondly recalls his time in Craigavon. The exhibition also includes Sloan's black and white photographs of Craigavon from the late 1970s and early 1980s, contemporary images that he created by scratching, painting and bleaching photographic prints, and recent work including large colour photographs of Moyraverty.

Sloan's exhibition Before, in Belfast Exposed gallery, Belfast, 2017, revealed an excerpt from an extensive but little-seen body of archival photographs that Sloan made in the 1970s and 80s in Northern Ireland. The images document the activities and characters that populated Sloan's daily life; the urban development of his hometown of Craigavon; and the constant and pervasive presence of the political conflict.

For the artist these photographs functioned as a type of preliminary 'sketchbook', shaping the distinctive style and thematics he would later become known for. Viewed together as an exhibition they represent Sloan's significant contribution to the tradition of Northern Irish documentary practice.

Books about Sloan and his work include Marking the North by Brian McAvera (1989), Victor Sloan: Selected Works by Aidan Dunne (2001), Victor Sloan: Walk, by Jürgen Schneider (2004), and Luxus by Glenn Patterson (2007).

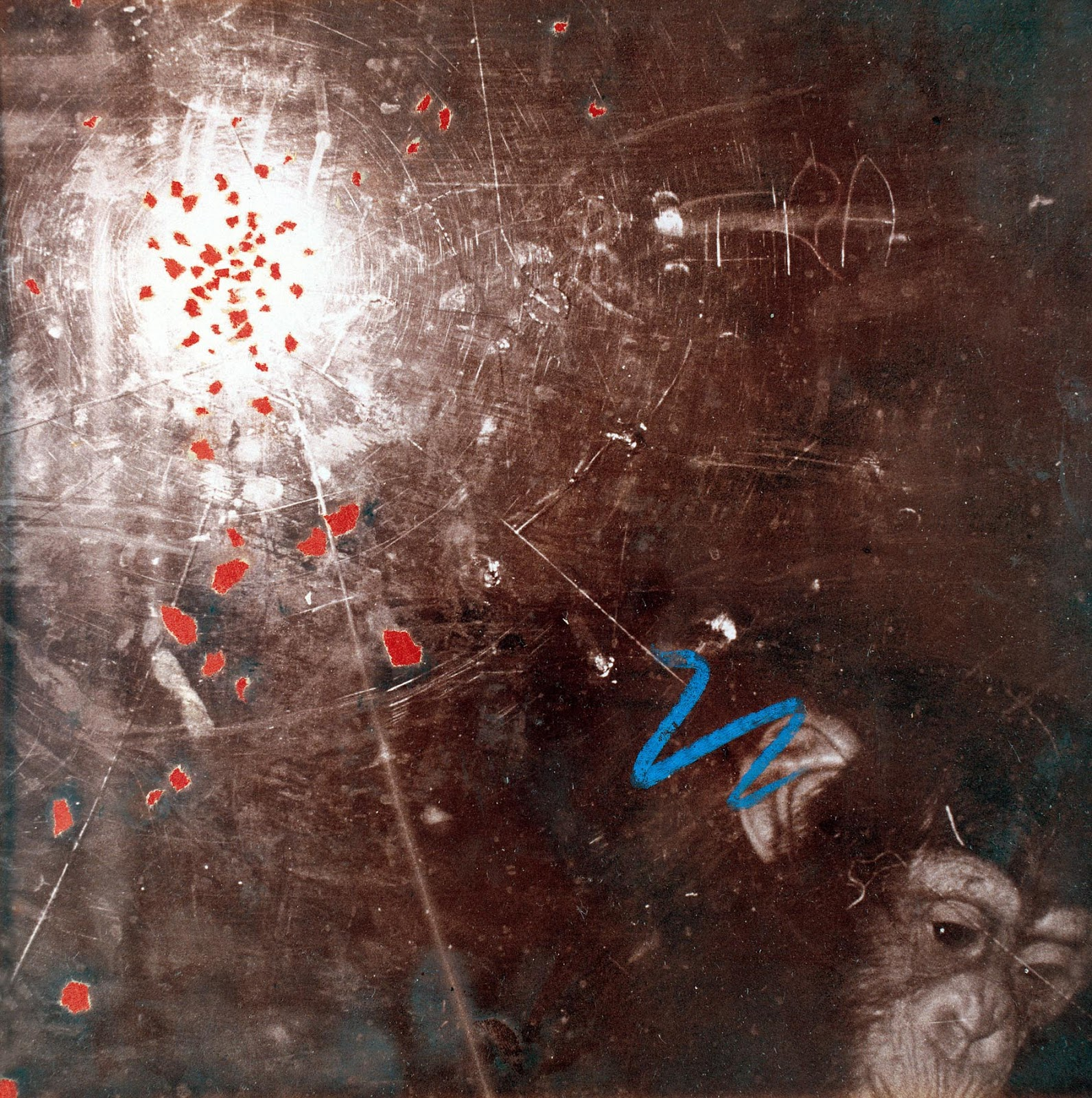
"Belfast Zoo III", silver gelatin print, toner, oil pastel and torn paper, 25 cm x 25 cm, 1983

== Photoworks ==
A typical image from the Northern Irish works of Sloan is Walk X from 1985. It is a silver gelatin print. In it we see dead centre, splitting the image, a uniformed police officer with a peaked cap. He is in profile, staring tight-lipped at the parade, feet apart in a rooted stance, symbol of law-and-order but also unusually for the North, of impartiality, indicated by his dead centre stance. From the left a huge Lambeg drum, strapped to its unseen owner's chest, juts out across the body; but it has been rendered semi-transparent so that the outline shape of the police officer can still be seen.

On one level this drum functions as a musical instrument, the rhythmic 'keeper of the beat'. But the unhinged arm, wielder of a timpani-like drum-stick, indicates not only the wardrum call, but also the potential of the drum-stick as a weapon. On another level the drum is like a Jasper Johns target with its concentric circles of black, white, black and white again for the heart of the target. The paradox is that the police officer who has often been seen, in the eyes of Catholics, as the defender of the Protestant tradition, has now become a target for his own loyalist people (the police being a largely Protestant force).

From Stadium installation

== Videoworks ==
Sloan's video work includes a 44-minute video of an 8 mm looped film fragment of The Little Rascals,(1930s), which destroys itself and catches fire. This was shown in the Gastag in Munich and in Toskanische Saulenhalle, Augsburg, Germany, 2004 as part of his installation Stadium. Gavin Weston in The Sunday Times describes it when first exhibited in the Old Museum Arts Centre, Belfast: "...a noisy trundling projector surrounded by four large prints at which one strains to peer through the blacked-out gloom. Staring back in time and this dingy light are the eyes of Adolf Hitler, bolstered by images of the Werner March/ Albert Speer – designed stadium that hosted the Berlin Olympics of 1936. There is no further direct reference to Jesse Owens, the Führer's gravest embarrassment, but flickering through this laden environment, archive footage of white children allowing a black child to draw the short straw, serves as an indicator".

The video work Walk (28 minutes, 2004.), has been shown in Berlin and Augsburg, Germany; Belfast, Portadown and Dublin, Ireland; Pretoria, South Africa; Bialystok, Poland; Madrid, Spain; Paris, France, and Damascus, Syria.

Susan McKay describes the video in The Irish Times: Walk shows, in slow, plodding motion, an Orange walk (as the parades are properly known to those who take part in them). The marchers appeared to disappear into a mirror, and the sound was distorted so that drumbeats sounded out suddenly like shots, and voices were slowed down to groans. In the end, the last shiny black shoe has marched into the mirror leaving an empty street. It is a melancholy piece".

Other video works include Drumcree (2001) and Fishtank (2006) Ka Fue Lay. (2014).

== Publications ==
- Lippard, Lucy R. (1985). Sloan, Victor in Divisions, Crossroads, Turns of Mind; Some New Irish Art. Ireland America Arts Exchange, Wisconsin and Williams College Museum of Art, US ASIN B00070NKCS
- McAvera, Brian (1986). Sloan, Victor in Directions Out – An investigation into a selection of artists whose work has been formed by the post 1969 situation in Northern Ireland. Dublin: Douglas Hyde Gallery. ISBN 0-907660-20-7
- Mirfenderesky, Jamshid (1988). Sloan, Victor in Ulster Art in the 80s. Dublin: RHA Gallagher Gallery. ISBN 1-871630-00-2
- McAvera, Brian (1989). Sloan, Victor in Art, Politics and Ireland. Dublin: Gill & Macmillan. ISBN 1-872496-00-8
- McGonagle, Declan; James Odling-Smee; Gerry Burns (1989). Victor Sloan: Walls. Derry: Orchard Gallery. ISBN 0-907797-52-0
- McAvera, Brian (1989). Marking The North-The Work of Victor Sloan. Dublin: Gill & Macmillan. ISBN 1-872496-01-6
- Watkins, Jonathan; Burns, Gerry; Strather, Martin (1991). Sloan, Victor in Kunst Europa. H. Schmidt. ISBN 3-87439-240-6
- Hutchinson, John (1990) Sloan, Victor in A New Tradition: Irish Art of the Eighties. Dublin: Douglas Hyde Gallery. ISBN 0-907660-37-1
- Mellor, David; Wood, Nancy (1992). Sloan, Victor in I-D Nationale. Edinburgh: Portfolio. ISBN 0-9520608-0-9
- Roberts, John (1992). Sloan, Victor in Selected Errors, Writings on Art and Politics, 1981–1990. London: Pluto. ISBN 0-7453-0498-2
- O'Toole, Finton (1995). Sloan, Victor in Lie of the Land. Dublin: Gallery of Photography. ISBN 0-9526741-0-6
- Kelly, Liam (1996). Sloan, Victor in Thinking Long – Contemporary Art In The North Of Ireland. Dublin: Gandon. ISBN 0-946641-66-8
- Schneider, Jürgen (1996) Victor Sloan. Poland: Biuro Wystaw Artystycznych. ISBN 83-903457-9-X
- Kelly, Liam (1996). Sloan, Victor in Paul Brennan and Catherine de Saint Phalle (eds), Désirs d'Irlande. Paris, France: Actes Sud. ISBN 2-7427-0748-4
- Williams, Val (1997). Sloan, Victor in On The Bright Side Of Life: Zeitgenössische Britische Fotografie. Berlin: Neue Gesellschaft für Bildende Kunst. ISBN 3-926796-50-2
- Buckman, David (1998). Sloan, Victor in The Dictionary of Artists in Britain Since 1945. Samson. ISBN 0-9532609-0-9
- McCabe, Martin (1999). Sloan, Victor in Revealing Views. London: Royal Festival Hall. ISBN 1-85332-194-X
- MacKillop, James (1999) Sloan, Victor in Contemporary Irish cinema. Syracuse, New York: Syracuse University Press. ISBN 0-8156-0568-4
- Brady, Ciaran (2000). Sloan, Victor in Encyclopedia of Ireland. New York: Oxford University Press. ISBN 0-19-521685-7
- Kiang, Tanya; McCabe, Martin; Wilson, Michael (2001). Sloan, Victor in W. J. McCormack (ed.), Blackwell Companion to Modern Irish Culture. Oxford: Blackwell. ISBN 0-631-16525-8
- Dunne, Aidan (2001). Victor Sloan: Selected Works 1980–2000. Belfast: Ormeau Baths Gallery. ISBN 0-9540086-0-X
- Clancy, Martin (2002). Sloan, Victor in Brian Lalor (ed.), The Encyclopedia of Ireland. Dublin: Gill and Macmillan. ISBN 0-7171-3000-2
- Graham, Colin (2003). Sloan, Victor in Allen, Nicholas; Kelly, Aaron (eds) The Cities of Belfast. Dublin: Four Courts. ISBN 1-85182-771-4
- Schneider, Jürgen (2004). Victor Sloan: Walk. Augsburg, Germany: Kulturbüro der Stadt.
- Tipton, Gemma (2005). Sloan, Victor in Space: Architecture for Art. Dublin: Circa. ISBN 0-9550319-0-7
- Graham, Colin (2005). Sloan, Victor in Cotter, Lucy (ed.), Third Text . "Every Passer-by a Culprit?", Kala/Black Umbrella. ISSN 0952-8822
- Alcobia-Murphy, Shane (2005). Sloan, Victor in Governing the Tongue in Northern Ireland: The Place of Art/The Art of Place. Newcastle: Cambridge Scholars. ISBN 1-904303-60-9
- McAvera, Brian (2006). Sloan, Victor in Icons of the North: Collective Histories of Northern Irish Art. Belfast: Golden Thread Gallery. ISBN 0-9549633-3-4
- Gallagher, William (2006). Sloan, Victor in The National Self-Portrait Collection of Ireland – volume 2, 1989–1999. Limerick, Ireland: University of Limerick Press. ISBN 0-946846-33-2
- Alcobia-Murphy, Shane (2006). Sloan, Victor in Sympathetic Ink: Intertextual Relations in Northern Irish Poetry. Liverpool: Liverpool University Press. ISBN 1-84631-032-6
- Szabó, Carmen (2007). Sloan, Victor in Clearing the Ground. Cambridge Scholars. ISBN 1-84718-180-5
- Patterson, Glenn (2007). Luxus. Portadown: Millennium Court Arts Centre. ISBN 978-0-9549816-5-5
- Richards, Peter (2008). Sloan, Victor in Contemporary Art: Northern Ireland. China, Museum of the Heilongjiang Daily
- McGonagle, Declan (2008). Sloan, Victor in A Shout in the Street: Collective Histories of Northern Irish Art. Belfast, Northern Ireland: Golden Thread Gallery. ISBN 978-0-9557469-2-5
- Brady, Sara and Walsh, Fintan, eds (2009). Crossroads: Performance Studies and Irish Culture. Basingstoke, England: Palgrave, ISBN 978-0-230-21998-4
- Sloan, Victor and Donnelly, Ann, eds (2009). My country is where I am, Craigavon: Arts Development: Craigavon Borough Council, ISBN 978-0-9564403-1-0
- Long, Declan (2009), Visual Art and the Conflict in Northern Ireland, Troubles Archive Essays. Belfast: Arts Council of Northern Ireland, ISBN 0-903203-20-0
- Graham, Colin (2009), Visual Culture in Britain, Volume 10, Issue 2. Oxfordshire, England: Routledge, ISSN 1471-4787
- Kennedy, Brian (2010). Sloan, Victor in A View From Napoleon's Nose, Kaohsiung, Taiwan: Kao Yuan Arts Centre, ISBN 978-986-6755-28-6
- McGonagle, Declan (2010). Sloan, Victor in A shout in the street: Reflections on another way of looking, Wasafiri, Oxfordshire, England: Routledge, ISSN 0269-0055
- Maigron, Maryline, Salati, Marie-Odile, eds (2010). Sloan, Victor in La Surface: accidents et altérations, Éditions de l'université de Savoie, Paris, France, ISBN 2-915797-63-3
- Carville, Justin (2011), Sloan, Victor in Photography and Ireland, Reaktion, London. ISBN 1-86189-871-1
- Graham, Colin (2013), Sloan, Victor in Northern Ireland: 30 years of Photography, Belfast Exposed/The MAC, Belfast, Northern Ireland, ISBN 978-0-9561766-1-5
- Barber, Fionna (2013), Sloan, Victor in Art in Ireland since 1910, Reaktion, London, ISBN 978 1 78023 0368
- Johnston, Sandra (2013), Sloan, Victor in "Beyond Reasonable Doubt", LIT, ISBN 978-3643904409
- Sverakova, Slavka (2014), Sloan, Victor in "The Faraway Nearby", F.E. McWilliam Gallery, Northern Ireland, ISBN 978-1-908455-11-6
- Bosi, Lorenzo, Demetriou, Chares, Malthaner, Stefan, eds (2014), Sloan, Victor in Dynamics of Political Violence, Ashgate, England, ISBN 978-1-4094-4351-3
- Marshall, Catherine and Murray, Peter, eds (2014), Sloan, Victor in Art and Architecture of Ireland, Volume V, Twentieth Century, Royal Irish Academy/Yale University Press, 2014, ISBN 978-0-300179-23-1
- Victor Sloan: Drift. Banbridge, Northern Ireland: F E McWilliam Gallery, 2014. ISBN 978-1-908455-13-0. With essays by Carville, Justin and Grant, Ken.
- Bevan, Sara (2015), Sloan, Victor in Art from Contemporary Conflict, Imperial War Museum, London, ISBN 1904897746
- Atkinson, Craig (ed.) (2016), "Northern Ireland One: Victor Sloan", series of three publications. Café Royal, Southport, England
- Hickey, Ciara (2017), "Victor Sloan: Before". Belfast Exposed, Belfast, Northern Ireland, 2017, ISBN 978-0-9561766-2-2
- Long, Declan, (2017), Sloan, Victor in "Ghost-haunted land: Contemporary art and post-Troubles Northern Ireland", Oxford University Press, ISBN 9781784991449
- Murray, Ann, (2018), Sloan, Victor in "Constructing the Memory of War in Visual Culture since 1914: The Eye on War", Routledge, ISBN 9781351360203
- Legg, George, (2018), Sloan, Victor in "Northern Ireland and the Politics of boredom", Manchester University Press, England, ISBN 978-1-5261-2886-7
- Muschter, Gabriele and Warnke, Uwe (2019), Victor Sloan in "Of People and Walls: 30 Years After the Fall of the Berlin Wall", Lukas Verlag für Kunst und Geistesgeschichte, ISBN 978-3-86732-344-4
- Crangle, Jack, (2023), Sloan, Victor in "Migrants, Immigration and Diversity in Twentieth-century Northern Ireland", Palgrave Macmillan, ISBN 978-3-031-18820-6
- Mawhinney, Kim, (2023), Sloan, Victor in "Troubled Art", National Museums, NI, ISBN 0900761679

== Exhibitions ==
From Walk video installation

- EV+A, Exhibition of Visual Art, City Gallery of Art, Limerick, 1981
- Views From Ulster, Touring exhibition curated by Colin Osman, Creative Camera, London. Peacock Gallery, Craigavon, Arts Council Gallery, Belfast, 1984-85
- Divisions, Crossroads, Turns of Mind: Some New Irish Art, curated by Lucy Lippard, touring US, Finland and Ireland, 1985–86
- Victor Sloan: Drumming, Arts Council of Northern Ireland Gallery, Belfast, 1986
- Next: Tomorrow, Cambridge Darkroom and Kettle's Yard, Cambridge, 1986
- Contrasts, Fung Ping Shan Museum, Hong Kong, China, 1987
- Critics' Choice, Fenderesky Gallery, Belfast, 1987
- Directions Out, Douglas Hyde Gallery, Dublin, 1987
- Magnetic North, Orchard Gallery, Derry and Impressions Gallery, York, 1987–88
- Selected Images – A Sense of Ireland, curated by Declan McGonagle and James Coleman, Riverside Studios, London and Arnolfini Gallery, Bristol, 1988
- Victor Sloan: The Birches, Orpheus Gallery, Belfast, 1988
- Ulster Art in the 80s, RHA Gallagher Gallery, Dublin, 1988
- Victor Sloan: Walls, Orchard Gallery, Derry, 1989
- Sun Life Awards, National Museum of Photography, Film and Television (now the National Media Museum), Bradford, 1989
- Irish Art of the Eighties, Douglas Hyde Gallery, Dublin, 1990
- Victor Sloan: Marking the North, Impressions Gallery, York and Cornerhouse, Manchester, 1990 – 92
- Victor Sloan: Force Fields, Mannheimer Kunstverein, Germany, as part of Kunst Europa, 1991
- I-D Nationale, Portfolio Gallery and 369 Gallery, Edinburgh, Scotland, 1992
- Victor Sloan: Acts of Faith, Gallery of Photography, Dublin and touring UK, 1992–95
- Bradford Print Exhibition, Cartwright Hall, Bradford, 1993
- Victor Sloan: Initials, Baltic Gallery of Contemporary Art, Poland, 1994
- Victor Sloan: Borne Sulinowo, Orchard Gallery, Derry, 1995
- The Lie of the Land, Gallery of Photography, Dublin, Centre Nationale de la Photographie, Paris, France and touring Europe, 1995–98
- Victor Sloan: Poza Bornym Sulinowem, Baszty Czarownic, Slupsk, Poland, 1996
- Zeitgenössische britische Fotografie, Neue Gesellschaft für Bildende Kunst, Kunstamt Kreuzberg/Künstlerhaus Bethanien, Berlin. and Kunstverein Ludwigshafen, Germany, 1997–98
- Victor Sloan: Stadium, Context Gallery, Derry; Old Museum Arts Centre, Belfast; galerie + edition caoc/Walden Kunstausstellungen, Berlin and Gasteig München, Munich, Germany, 1998–99
- Revealing Views: Images from Ireland, Royal Festival Hall, South Bank Centre, London, 1999
- Victor Sloan: Portadown, Orchard Gallery, Derry, 2000
- Recent Work from Northern Ireland, curated by Wayne Bearwaldt, Plug In Institute of Contemporary Art, Winnipeg, Canada, 2001
- Victor Sloan: Selected Works 1980–2000, Ormeau Baths Gallery, Belfast, 2001
- The Public Eye: 50 years of the Arts Council Collection, Ormeau Baths Gallery, Belfast, 2002
- Revealed Treasures, Long Gallery, Parliament Buildings, Stormont, Belfast, 2002
- Blue Skies, Grey Mists, Old Museum Arts Centre, Belfast, 2004
- Victor Sloan: Walk, Toskanische Saulenhalle, Augsburg, Germany, 2004
- Seeing Orange, Millennium Court Arts Centre, Portadown, 2005
- Icons of the North: Collective Histories of Northern Irish Art, Socio-Political Art from 1969–1994, Golden Thread Gallery, Belfast, 2006
- Icons of the North: Collective Histories of Northern Irish Art, Solstice Arts Centre, Navan, Co. Meath, 2006
- Victor Sloan: Walk:, Théâtre Paris-Villette, Paris, France (Rencontres Internationales Paris/Berlin), 2006
- Things We May Have Missed, curated by Peter Richards, Golden thread Gallery, Switch Room, Belfast, 2007
- Victor Sloan: Luxus, Millennium Court Arts Centre, Portadown, 2007
- Victor Sloan: Walk:, Diversions Festival, Gallery of Photography, Dublin (Projection, Meeting House Square), 2007
- Victor Sloan: History, Locality, Allegiance, curated by Peter Richards, Golden Thread Gallery, Switch Room, Belfast, 2008
- Breakthrough, Imperial War Museum, London, 2008–2010
- Drawing a Line: A Contemporary Survey of Northern Irish Art, curated by Peter Richards, Museum of the Heilongjiang Daily, China, 2008
- A Shout in the Street: Collective Histories of Northern Irish Art, curated by Declan McGonagle, Golden Thread Gallery, Belfast, 2008
- An Eye for an Eye: Representations of Conflict in Ireland, curated by Dermot Keogh and Ruth Osborne, Lewis Glucksman Gallery, Cork, 2008/9
- Arts Council of Northern Ireland Troubles Archive Exhibition, curated by Feargal O'Malley and Liam Kelly, Ormeau Baths Gallery, Belfast, 2009
- The Northern Ireland Collection: Fresh Perspectives, curated by Zoë Lippett, Wolverhampton Art Gallery, Wolverhampton, England, 2009/10
- A View From Napoleon's Nose, curated by Brian Kennedy, Kao Yuan Arts Centre, Kaohsiung, Taiwan, 2010
- Elective Perspective, Galeria Arsenale, Białystok, Poland, 2010
- The Art of the Troubles, Mid Antrim Museum, Northern Ireland, 2010
- Victor Sloan: Walk, AllArtNow Gallery, Damascus, Syria, 2010
- Portrait of the North, Wolverhampton Art Gallery, Wolverhampton, England, 2010–2011
- Syrian Artists Talking, with Brian Kennedy, Naughton Gallery, Belfast, 2011
- Images: Victor Sloan, Art and Design Academy, LJMU, Look International Photography Festival, Liverpool, England, 2011
- Voices from the Levant, Context Gallery, Derry, with Brian Kennedy, 2011
- Nepotism+ 1, curated by Feargal O'Malley, Platform, Belfast, 2012
- Aleppo International Photography Festival, Aleppo, Syria, 2012
- Picturing Derry, the City Factory, Derry, Northern Ireland, as part of UK City of Culture, 2013
- Northern Ireland: 30 Years of Photography, the MAC and Belfast Exposed, Belfast, Northern Ireland, 2013
- The Far Away Nearby, F E McWilliams Gallery & Studio, Banbridge, 2014
- Art in the Eastside, Billboard Project, Creative Exchange, various locations, Belfast (invited artist) 2013
- Art of the Troubles, Ulster Museum, Belfast, Northern Ireland, 2014
- Voices Travel: A Conversation Between Two Harbours, Kaohsiung Museum of Fine Arts, Taiwan, 2014
- Craigavon New Town: 50 Years of Modernity, curated by PLACE, Golden Thread Gallery, Belfast, 2014
- Victor Sloan: Borne Sulinowo, The University Gallery, Belfast, 2014
- Victor Sloan: Drift, F E McWilliams Gallery and Studio, curated by Dr Riann Coulter and Feargal O'Malley, Banbridge, Northern Ireland, 2014
- Art of the Troubles, Wolverhampton Art Gallery, Wolverhampton, England, 2014–2015
- Victor Sloan: The Baron, Belfast Print Workshop Gallery, Belfast, 2015
- Victor Sloan: Before, Belfast Exposed Gallery, Belfast, Northern Ireland, 2017
- Conflicting Images: Photography during the Northern Irish Troubles. Ulster Museum, Belfast, 2017–2018.
- Aleppo, Tropenmuseum, Amsterdam, Holland, 2017
- Crossing Lines, Highlanes Gallery, Drogheda, Ireland and F.E. McWilliam Gallery, Banbridge, Northern Ireland 2018–19.
- Troubles Art, Nerve Visual Gallery, Derry, Northern Ireland, 2019.
- Of people and walls – 30 years after the fall of the Berlin Wall, Schloss Biesdorf, Berlin, Germany, 2019–2020.
- Island Life, Bristol Museum and Art Gallery, part of Bristol Photography Festival, 2021.
- Portrait of Northern Ireland: neither an elegy nor a manifesto, Centenary exhibition, Curated by Shan McAnena, Golden Thread Gallery, Belfast, 2021.
- Against The Image: Photography. Media. Manipulation, curated by Clare Gormley and Anna Liesching, Ulster Museum, Belfast, Northern Ireland, (Belfast Photo Festival), 2022.
- Images Are All We Have, The Paintwork's, Dublin Castle, Dublin, Ireland. PhotoIreland Festival, 2022.
- Victor Sloan: Beyond, Belfast Exposed Gallery, Belfast, (Belfast International Arts Festival), 2023.
- Now and Then, Belfast Exposed Gallery, Belfast, Northern Ireland. 2024.

"Route III (Lurgan)", silver gelatin print, toners and gouache.

== Collections ==
Sloan's work is held in the following public collections:

- Imperial War Museum, London
- Ulster Museum, Belfast.
- The Arts Council of Northern Ireland
- State Art Collection, Ireland
- Dublin City University
- Martin Parr Foundation, Bristol, England
- Ulster Television Collection, Belfast
- Lamar Dodd Arts Centre, Georgia, United States
- National Media Museum, Bradford, England
- The Northern Ireland Collection, Wolverhampton Art Gallery
- Museum of International Contemporary Art, Salvador, Brazil
- Department of Finance and Personnel, Northern Ireland
- North West Arts Trust
- Royal Ulster Academy of Arts
- National Self-Portrait Collection of Ireland, University of Limerick.
