= Elizabeth Magill =

Irish painter (born 1959)

Elizabeth Magill (born 1959 in Ontario, Canada) is an Irish painter. She studied at the Belfast College of Art and the Slade School of Fine Art, and now lives and works in London.

== Biography ==
Magill grew up in Northern Ireland but lives and works in London. She began exhibiting in the mid-1980s. Her work draws from a wide range of visual sources, often integrating photographic materials and processes into her painting in novel ways. She has recently made an excursion into video, also. Over the past few years, she has created a series of paintings of landscapes in a revisioning of the tradition of the romantic sublime. Her first major solo exhibition was at the Arnolfini Gallery, Bristol, in 1990. In the same year she was included in the seminal 'British Art Show', which first introduced many prominent younger British artists to a wider public.

She has had one-person exhibitions at various venues in Ireland, Britain, Germany, France and Spain, including Southampton City Art Gallery in 1998; Kerlin Gallery in 1999; Wilkinson Gallery London in 2002, 2008; Greenberg Van Doren Gallery in New York, the Hugh Lane Municipal Gallery Dublin in 2003 and the Ikon Gallery, Birmingham; Baltic, Gateshead and Milton Keynes Gallery in 2004. She has held fellowships at the Tate Gallery, Liverpool and Saarlandisches Kunstlerhaus, Saarbrücken, Germany. Selected group exhibitions include 'Places in Mind', (with Adam Chodzko and Stan Douglas), Ormeau Baths Gallery, Belfast 2000, and 'Premio Michetti 2000' at Fondazione Michetti, Italy.

‘Headland’ was a major solo exhibition by Magill in Ireland (2017-18) which was curated and toured by Limerick City Gallery of Art in partnership with the RHA, Dublin, and the Ulster Museum, Belfast, and supported through the Arts Council of Ireland’s Touring and Dissemination of Work Scheme. The exhibition launched at LCGA on 8 September 2017, with an introduction by Dr. Barbara Dawson, Director of the Hugh Lane Gallery, Dublin. It was subsequently presented at the RHA from 18 January 2018 and the Ulster Museum from May 2018 onward.

Magill is represented in many public and private collections worldwide, including those of the Irish Museum of Modern Art, the Hugh Lane Gallery, Dublin, the Arts Council of England, Southampton City Art Gallery, the British Council, and the National Gallery of Australia.

== Themes and techniques ==
A principal theme of Magill's work is "hauntingly distressed paintings of the landscape". For recent work, the creation process begins with a photograph which is scanned and the resulting image sprayed on canvas before being overpainted with oils to add highlights and contrast. The result has been compared stylistically with that of the German Romantic painter Caspar David Friedrich (1774–1840). She has described her work as

"I'm not so much painting what is there but what I imagine might be there...These works are not landscapes as such, but more like suggested backdrops to how I feel, think and interpret the world."

Apparent influences are the glens and coastline of Northern Ireland, where she spent most of her childhood, but the emptiness of the landscapes themselves is generally tempered by empty houses, electricity pylons, and the like, giving a sense of absence of human life and wistful isolation.

== Exhibitions ==
Her first major solo exhibition was at the Arnolfini Gallery, Bristol, in 1990. In the same year she was included in the seminal 'British Art Show', which first introduced many prominent younger British artists to a wider public.

She has had one-person exhibitions at various venues throughout Western Europe including

- 1998 - Southampton City Art Gallery
- 1999 - Kerlin Gallery
- 2002 - Anthony Wilkinson Gallery, London
- 2003 - Artemis Greenberg Van Doren Gallery, New York
- 2003 - Hugh Lane Municipal Gallery, Dublin

Magill has held fellowships at the Tate Liverpool and Saarlandisches Kunstlerhaus, Saarbrücken, Germany. Her work has also featured in several group exhibitions, including

- 2000 - 'Places in Mind', (with Adam Chodzko and Stan Douglas), Ormeau Baths Gallery, Belfast
- 2000 - 'Premio Michetti 2000' at Fondazione Michetti, Italy.

Magill is represented in many public and private collections worldwide including those of the Irish Museum of Modern Art, the Arts Council of England, Southampton City Art Gallery, the British Council and the National Gallery of Australia.

In 2006 Sotheby's Auction House reported achieving a record price for Magill's work at an auction of Irish Artists.
