= Aleana =

Aleana is a feminine given name, similar to Alanna and Alena.

== List of people with the given name ==
- Aleana Egan (born 1979), Irish sculptor
- Aleana Young, Canadian politician
