= Hugh Mulholland =

Hugh Mulholland (born in 1966 in Lurgan, County Armagh) is a curator based in Belfast.

Mulholland was the founder and director of Context Gallery in Derry. In 1997 he was appointed director of the Ormeau Baths Gallery, Belfast. During his tenure at the gallery he curated major exhibitions by prominent International artists including, Barbara Freeman, Jack Pakenham, Yoko Ono, David Byrne, Hans Peter Kuhn, Stan Douglas, Willie Doherty, Victor Sloan and Alistair MacLennan.

The Ormeau Baths Gallery closed in controversial circumstances in March 2006 following an announcement by the Arts Council of Northern Ireland that it would not be renewing its funding of the gallery. This led to protests and claims from the arts community that the closure was unjustified. The gallery reopened under Arts Council control in June 2006, and Mulholland went on to open his own gallery, The Third Space.

Mulholland was appointed the curator for the Northern Irish Pavilion at the 2005 Venice Biennale by the British Council Northern Ireland and the Arts Council of Northern Ireland. This was the first time that Northern Ireland was represented with its own pavilion at the exhibition. Mulholland was subsequently chosen to curate the Northern Ireland presence at the 2007 Biennale as well, where he organised an exhibition of Willie Doherty.

In the 1999 Belfast Arts Awards Hugh Mulholland received the Visual Arts Trophy for the Ormeau Baths Gallery's 1998/1999 programme. He has been also involved with the Belfast Festival of Design and was a member of the Jury panel for the £15,000 Glen Dimplex Artists Award 1999 held at the Irish Museum of Modern Art in Dublin.

Since 2012 he is the curator of the Metropolitan Arts Centre (MAC) in Belfast.

== Bibliography ==
- Hugh Mulholland, Alistair MacLennan: Knot Naught, Ormeau Baths Gallery, Belfast, 2003.
- Hugh Mulholland, Vittorio Urbani, Peter Liversidge and Antonio Riello: Through the Window, Italian Cultural Institute, London, 2003.
- Hugh Mulholland, Suzanna Chan, Michele Robecchi, The Nature of Things: Artists from Northern Ireland, Venice Biennale, 2005.
- Hugh Mulholland, Willie Doherty: Ghost Story, Venice Biennale, 2007.
- Hugh Mulholland, Ciara Hickey, Christopher James Burns: Soliloquy, Queen's University Belfast, 2012.
