= Brendan Ellis =

Brendan Ellis (born 1951) is an Irish artist and teacher based in Belfast.

== Education ==
Ellis studied at St Mary's Grammar School and the Ulster Polytechnic (now Ulster University). He moved to London in 1974 and he gained his master's degree at the Royal College of Art in 1977. As part of his studies there, he won the John Minton Drawing Prize.

== Early career ==
In the late 1970s, he worked as a teacher, as well as being a clerical officer and mural painter for the Civil Service. In 1979 he became a medical artist at the Royal Victoria Hospital, Belfast. From 1987 he was shop steward for the Confederation of Health Service Employees at the hospital.

== Artwork ==
His artistic work includes the Stations of the Cross for St Columba's Roman Catholic Church, Annan, Dumfriesshire (1984), commissions for churches in England, from 1990 and a commissioned self-portrait for the National Collection, Limerick in 1992.

His work focuses on aspects of the troubles in Northern Ireland, depicting stylized characters against the backdrop of everyday scenes of urban life affected by political violence.

Ellis has had solo exhibitions in Belfast, at the Kerlin Gallery in Dublin, and at the Arts Council of Northern Ireland.

He has worked as a medical artist at the Royal Hospitals in Belfast since 1979.

== Family ==
Ellis has a brother, Fergal Ellis, who is also an artist.
