= Tavares Strachan =

Bahamian conceptual artist (born 1979)

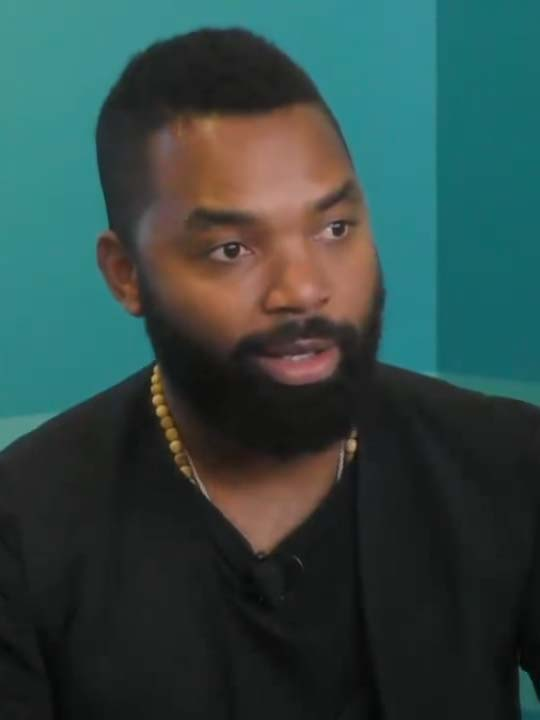
- Strachan in 2017
- Born: December 16, 1979 (age 46); Nassau, Bahamas
- Education: College of the Bahamas
- Alma mater: Rhode Island School of Design; Yale University
- Occupation: Conceptual artist

Tavares Henderson Strachan (born 1979) is a Bahamian conceptual artist. His contemporary multi-media installations investigate science, technology, mythology, history, and exploration. He lives and works in New York City and Nassau, Bahamas.

== Early life and education ==
Strachan was born in Nassau, Bahamas, on December 16, 1979. He was introduced to the arts as a child through his family’s involvement in Junkanoo, a historical annual parade and cultural celebration incorporating live music, dance, and elaborate costumes hand-made by competing groups.

Initially a painter, Strachan earned his Associate of Fine Arts degree from the College of the Bahamas in 1999. In 2000, he moved to the United States to enroll in the glass department at the Rhode Island School of Design, where he began to pursue more conceptual projects that would foreground the prevalent themes and minimalist aesthetic of his later work. After completing his Bachelor of Fine Arts degree at the Rhode Island School of Design in 2003, Strachan went on to earn his Master of Fine Arts degree in Sculpture from Yale University in 2006.

== Work ==
Strachan’s ambitious and open-ended practice examines the intersection of art, science, and the environment, and has included collaborations with numerous organizations and institutions across the disciplines.

=== The Distance Between What We Have and What We Want (2006) ===
One of Strachan’s most iconic projects was The Distance Between What We Have and What We Want (2006), for which he embarked on a journey to the Alaskan Arctic to excavate a 2.5-ton block of ice which was then transported via FedEx to his native Bahamas and displayed in a solar-powered freezer in the courtyard of his childhood elementary school. The piece is both physically arresting and metaphorically resonant, referencing the fragility of Earth’s homeostatic systems, the strange poetry of cultural and physical displacement, as well as the little-known contributions of Matthew Henson—an under-recognized American explorer and the co-discoverer of the North Pole.

=== Orthostatic Tolerance series ===
In 2004, Strachan initiated an ambitious four-year multimedia series entitled Orthostatic Tolerance—the title referring to the physiological stress that cosmonauts endure while exiting and re-entering Earth from outer space. Exhibited in phases between 2008 and 2011, the Orthostatic Tolerance project incorporated photography, video, drawing, sculpture and installation documenting Strachan’s experience in cosmonaut training at the Yuri Gagarin Training Center in Star City, Russia, and in experiments in space travel conducted in Nassau under the Bahamas Air and Space Exploration Center (BASEC)—the artist’s version of NASA for his native country.

=== Seen/Unseen (2011) ===
In 2011, Strachan exhibited Seen/Unseen—a survey exhibition of past and present works—at an undisclosed location in New York City that was deliberately closed to the general public. Exploring themes of presence and absence, the exhibition focused on the artist’s critical mandate of positioning works in such a way that some of their aspects are visible while others remain conceptual, asserting the exhibition itself is a work of art in its own right. Both ambitious in scope and disruptive to expectations, Seen/Unseen manifested a type of meditative experience, presenting over 50 works from drawings, photographs, video works, sculpture, and installations in a massive 20,000-square-foot industrial space converted specifically for the exhibition. While access to Seen/Unseen was restricted to the organizers, the exhibition itself was fully documented with a website and an illustrated catalogue designed by Stefan Sagmeister.

=== ENOCH (2018) ===
On December 3, 2018, Strachan launched his project ENOCH into space. Created in collaboration with the LACMA Art + Technology Lab, ENOCH is centered around the development and launch of a 3U satellite that brings to light the forgotten story of Robert Henry Lawrence Jr., the first African American astronaut selected for any national space program. The satellite launched via Spaceflight’s SSO-A SmallSat Express mission from Vandenberg Air Force Base on a SpaceX Falcon 9 rocket. The sculpture circled the Earth for three years in a Sun-synchronous orbit before reentering on December 21, 2021.

=== The First Supper (Galaxy Black) (2021–2023) ===
In February 2024, Strachan unveiled The First Supper (Galaxy Black) at the Royal Academy of Arts in London. The bronze sculpture, overlaid with black patina and gold leaf, reinterprets Da Vinci's The Last Supper with Black historical figures. Haile Selassie takes the place of Jesus, and Strachan takes the place of Judas. The included figures are (from left to right): Tavares Strachan (self-portrait), Sister Rosetta Tharpe, Harriet Tubman, Shirley Chisholm, Marcus Garvey, Zumbi dos Palmares, Haile Selassie, Mary Seacole, Matthew Henson, Marsha P. Johnson, King Tubby, Derek Alton Walcott, and Robert Henry Lawrence.

=== The Day Tomorrow Began (2025) ===
The artist’s first museum exhibition in Los Angeles and at LACMA, featured immersive multi-sensory installations. Strachan is interested in what has been rendered invisible within mainstream narratives, particularly related to the Black diaspora. His artworks—across media including neon, sculpture, painting, text, music, and performance—illuminate stories through which new ideas can emerge.

=== Marian Goodman and curation ===
Strachan is represented by Marian Goodman since 2020, and in that same year, the Gallery's London space presented In Plain Sight, the artist's first major UK solo show and in 2020, his The Awakening was presented at Goodman's Manhattan space.

Strachan curated a solo exhibition for his mentor Stanley Burnside in 2022. The exhibition, Stanley Burnside: As Time Goes On, was presented at Galerie Perrotin in New York.

== Awards and honors ==
His recognition includes a MacArthur Foundation Grant (2022), the Inaugural Allen Institute artist-in-residence (2018), LACMA Art + Technology Lab artist grant (2014), Tiffany Foundation grant (2008), Grand Arts Residency Fellowship (2007), and Alice B. Kimball fellowship (2006). In 2013, he represented the Bahamas at the 55th Venice Biennale.

== Bibliography ==
- Maxwell Heller, Franklin Sirmans, Tavares Strachan: Orthostatic Tolerance: It Might Not Be Such a Bad Idea if I Never Went Home, MIT List Visual Arts Center, Cambridge, MA, 2010.
- Robert Hobbs, Stamatina Gregory, Christian Viveros-Fauné, Tavares Strachan: I Belong Here, Conceptio Unlimited Publication, New York, 2013.
- Robert Hobbs, Gregory Volk, Mimi Sheller, Franklin Sirmans, Tavares Strachan: Seen/Unseen, ArtAsiaPacific, New York, 2014.
- Adrian Searle, Tavares Strachan: In Plain Sight, Marian Goodman Gallery/Isolated Publishing, New york, 2022.
- Pedro Alonzo, Gavin Delahunty, Erin Jenoa Gilbert, Alysia Nicole Harris, Tavares Strachan: The Awakening, Marian Goodman Gallery/Isolated Publishing, New York, 2024.
- Olivia Anani, Michele Robecchi, Tavares Strachan: In Total Darkness, Marian Goodman Gallery/Isolated Publishing, New York, 2024.
- Emmanuel Perrotin, Romi Crawford, Nancy Spector, Kaitlyn Greenidge, Tavares Strachan: In Broad Daylight, Perrotin/Isolated Publishing, New York, 2024.
- Ralph Rugoff, Maggie M. Chao, Ekow Eshun, Tavares Strachan: There Is Light Somewhere, Hayward Gallery Publishing, London, 2024.
- Michele Robecchi, Gavin Delahunty, Emma Dabiri, Jason Schmidt, Tavares Strachan, Phaidon, London, 2026.

== See also ==
- List of Bahamian artists
