= Istituto Italiano di Cultura =

Organization

- Founder: Italian government
- Type: Cultural institution
- Region served: Worldwide (85 Italian Cultural Institutes)
- Product: Italian cultural and language education

The Istituto Italiano di Cultura, the Italian Cultural Institute in English, is a worldwide non-profit organization created by the Italian government. It promotes Italian culture and is involved in the teaching of the Italian language. The creation of the institute was in response to the desire for a deeper understanding of Italian culture throughout many continents. By organising cultural activities it supports the work carried out by the Italian Embassies and Consulates. There are 85 Italian Cultural Institutes throughout major cities around the world.

== General functions of the Institute ==
According to the provisions of the law 401/90, article 8 and the regulation 392/95, the Italian Cultural Institutes have the following functions:

- To establish contacts with institutions, agencies and organizations of the cultural and scientific environment of the hosting country and to promote proposals and projects with the aim of knowing the Italian culture and facts oriented to cultural and scientific collaborations.
- To provide documentation and information about the Italian cultural life and connected institutions.
- To promote initiatives, cultural manifestations and exhibitions.
- To support initiatives aimed at cultural development of the Italian communities abroad, in order to encourage their integration in the hosting country as well as cultural relationship with the home country.
- To assure collaboration with scholars and Italian students in their research activities and study abroad.
- To promote and support initiatives for the Italian language diffusion abroad, making use of Italian lecturers at the hosting country’s universities.

== Headquarters in the world ==
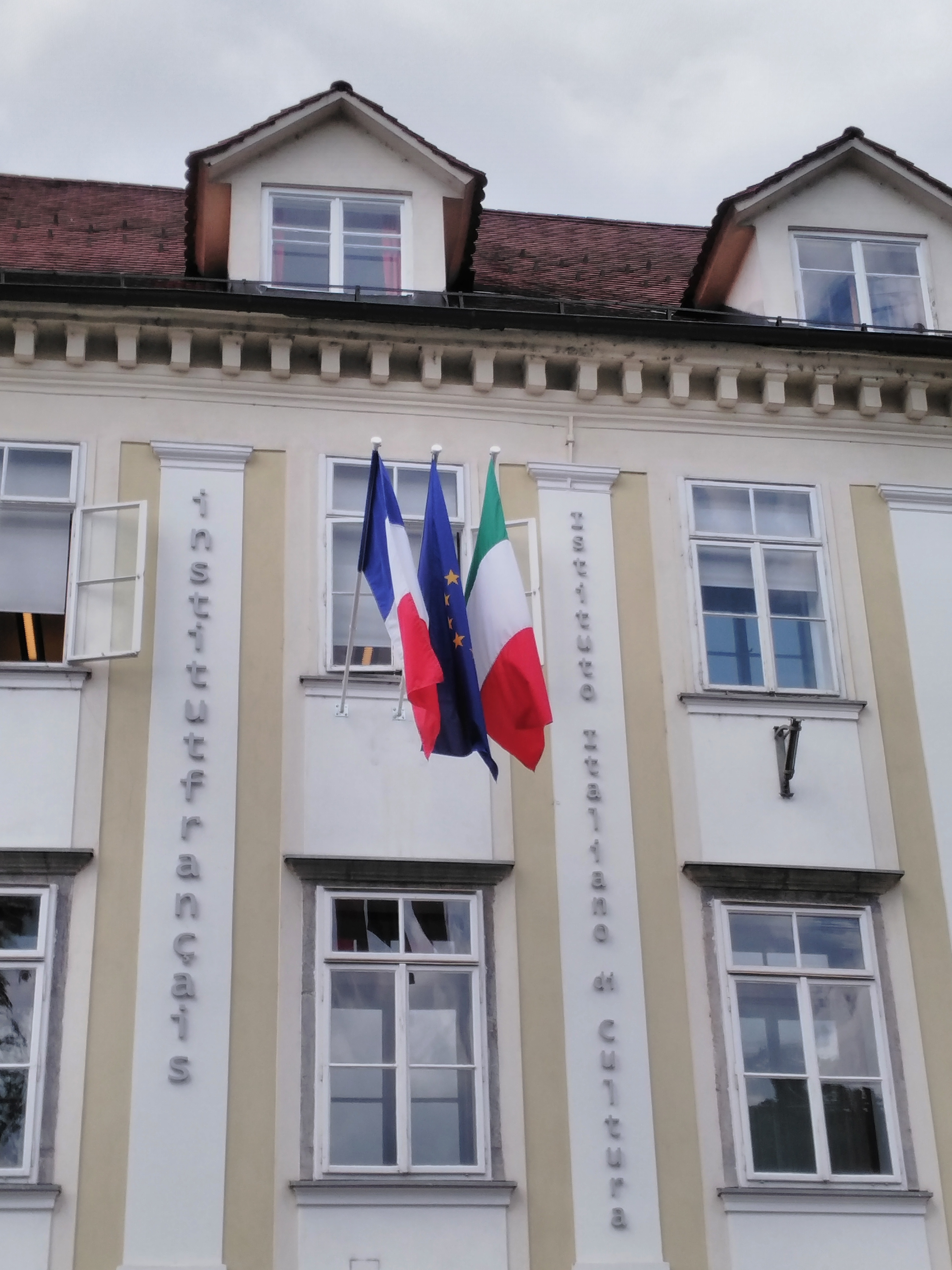
Istituto Italiano di Cultura and Institut Français in Ljubljana (Slovenia)

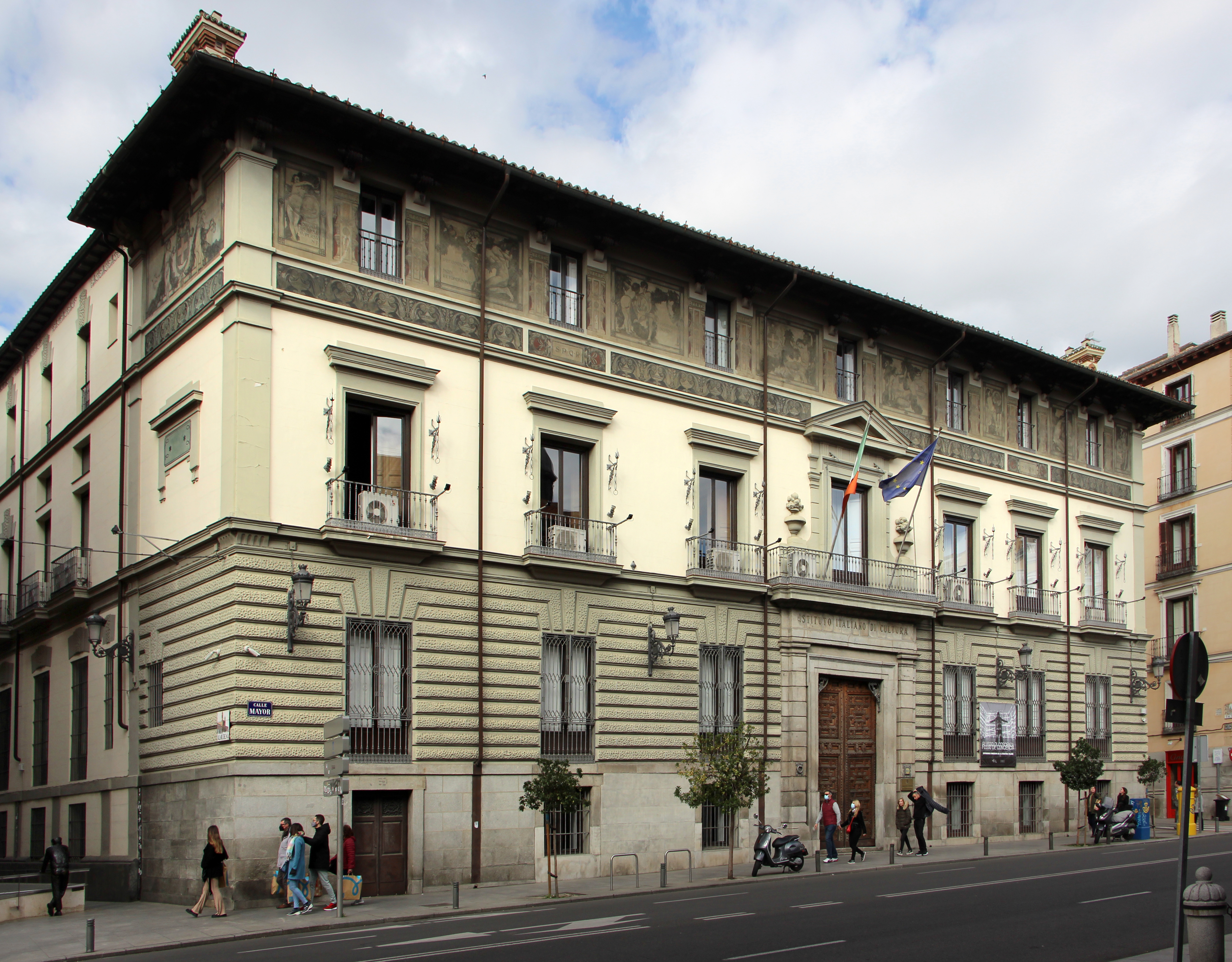
Palacio de Abrantes, seat of Istituto Italiano di Cultura in Madrid (Spain)

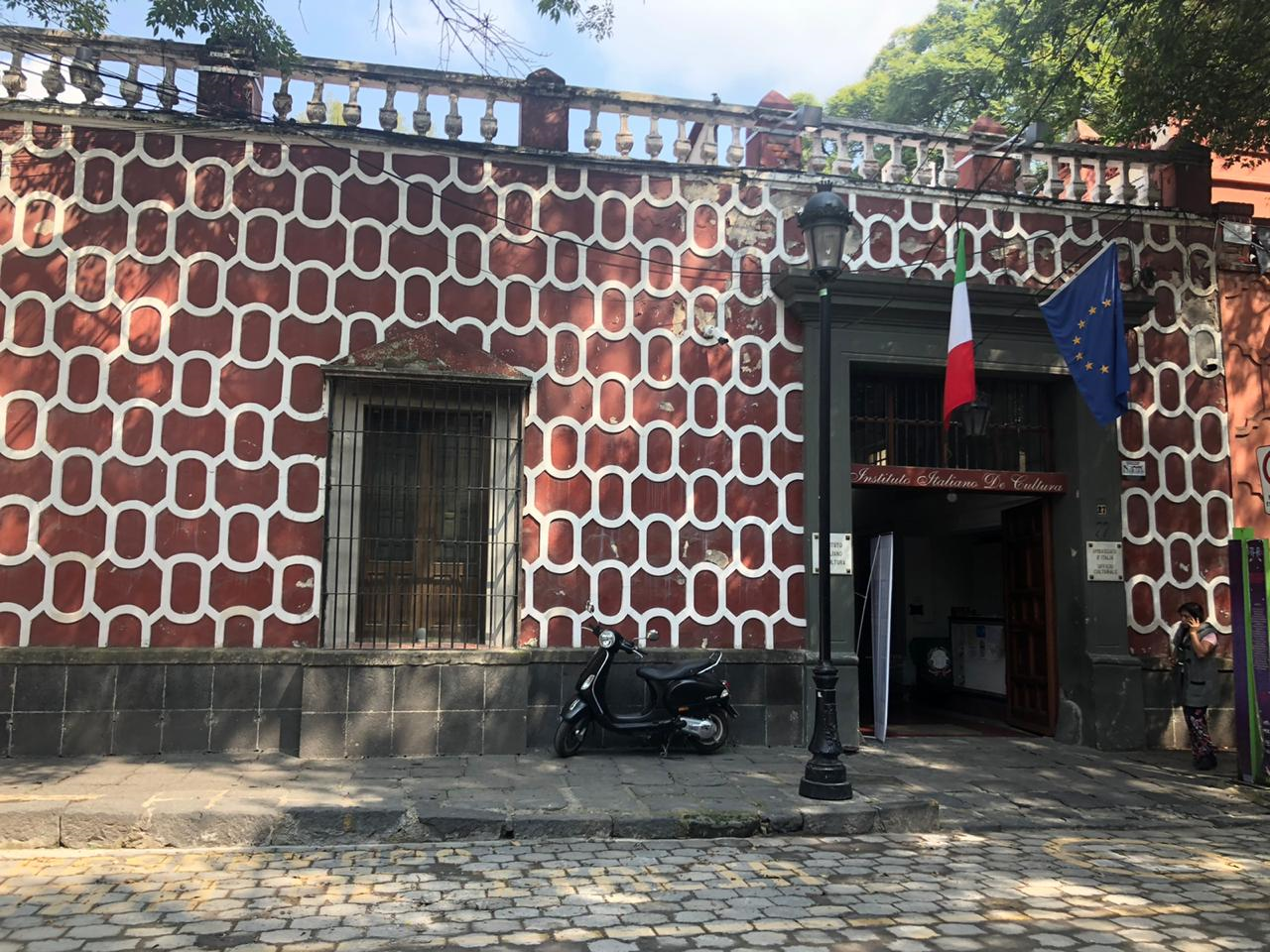
Istituto Italiano di Cultura in Mexico City (Mexico)

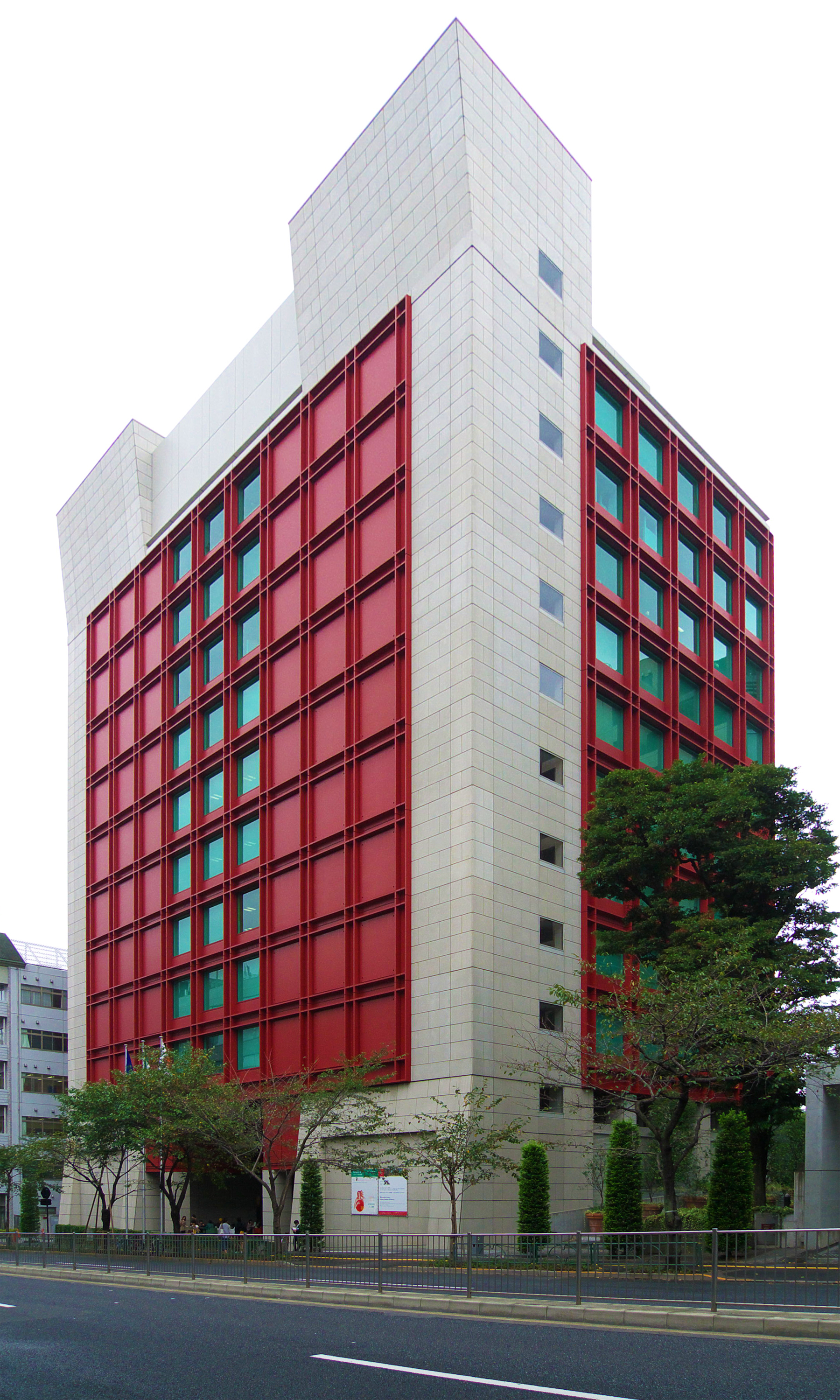
Istituto Italiano di Cultura di Tokyo (Japan)

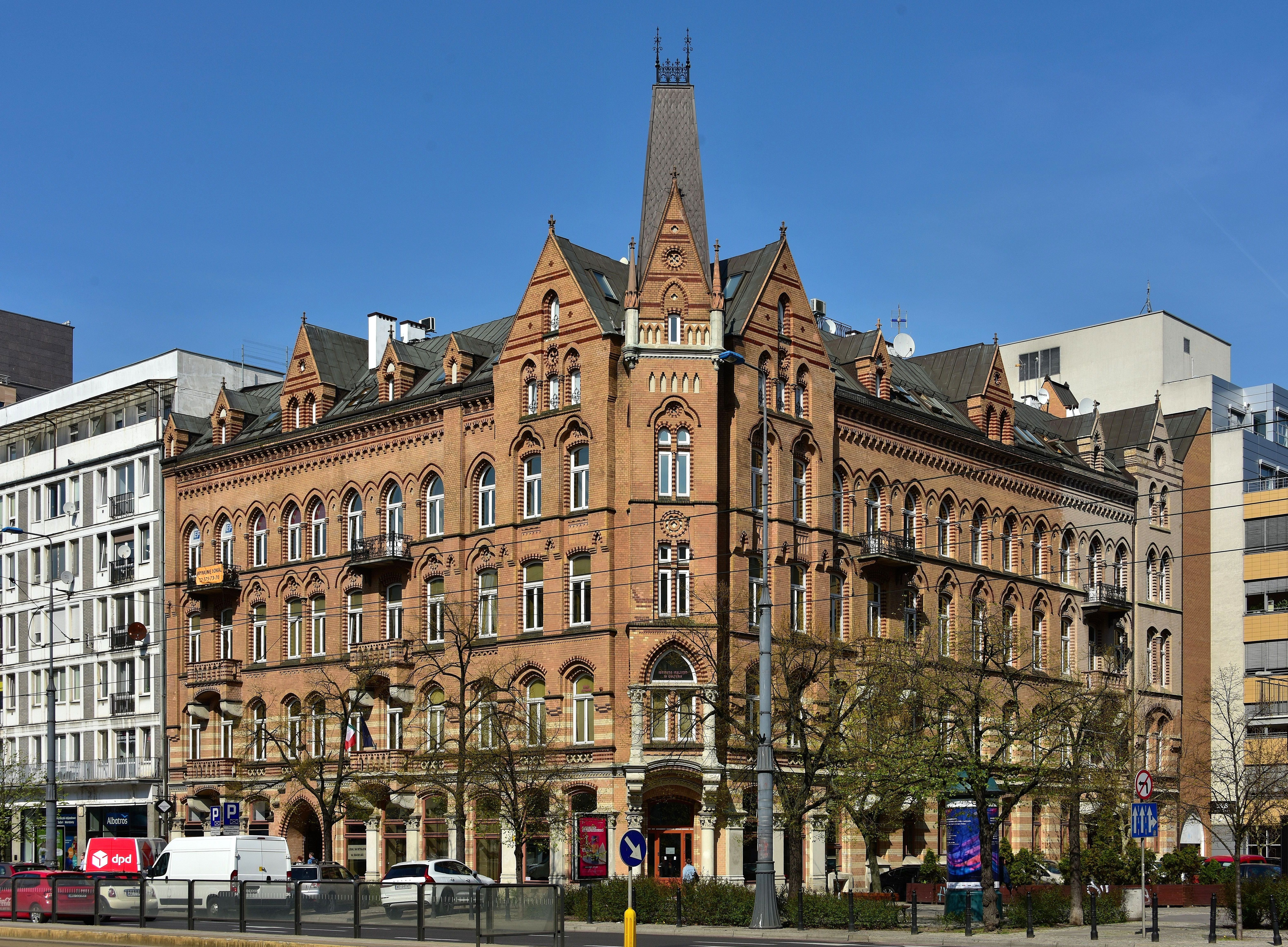
Istituto Italiano di Cultura in Warsaw (Poland)

The Italian Cultural Institute has numerous main offices all over the world, that assure an extensive coverage of the Italian culture and language diffusion. Each Italian Cultural Institute is the Cultural Section of the Consulate General of Italy in that city. The current premises have a historical value and they belong to the Italian Government. The Institute is a centre for cultural and academic activities, a school of Italian language and civilization, a source of information about contemporary Italy, its regions and its multilayered cultural heritage as well as a venue for art exhibitions, lectures, films, and video screenings.

In addition, the Institute provides the opportunity for cultural collaboration between Italian and foreign organizations and individuals, in order to facilitate exchange in the field of theatre, music and cinema. It offers information and logistical support to both Italian and foreign public and private operators interested in Italian cultural events. The Institute supports initiatives which favour intercultural and multilateral dialogue based on the principles of democracy, reciprocal respect and international solidarity and it is often involved in events organized by other cultural offices of the EU countries.

== Locations ==
Supported mainly by the Italian Ministry of Foreign Affairs, the Italian Cultural Institutes number 86 worldwide.

=== Europe ===
- Amsterdam, Netherlands
- Athens, Greece
- Barcelona, Spain
- Belgrade, Serbia
- Berlin, Germany
- Bratislava, Slovakia
- Brussels, Belgium
- Bucharest, Romania
- Budapest, Hungary
- Cologne, Germany
- Copenhagen, Denmark
- Dublin, Ireland
- Edinburgh, Scotland
- Hamburg, Germany
- Helsinki, Finland
- Istanbul, Turkey
- Kyiv, Ukraine
- Kraków, Poland
- La Valletta, Malta
- Lisbon, Portugal
- Ljubljana, Slovenia
- London, England: Italian Cultural Institute, London
- Lyon, France
- Madrid, Spain
- Marseille, France
- Munich, Germany
- Moscow, Russia
- Oslo, Norway
- Paris, France
- Prague, Czech Republic
- Saint Petersburg, Russia
- Sofia, Bulgaria
- Stockholm, Sweden
- Strasbourg, France
- Stuttgart, Germany
- Tirana, Albania
- Vienna, Austria
- Vilnius, Lithuania
- Warsaw, Poland
- Zagreb, Croatia
- Zürich, Switzerland

=== Africa ===
- Addis Ababa, Ethiopia
- Algiers, Algeria
- Cairo, Egypt
- Dakar, Senegal
- Nairobi, Kenya
- Pretoria, South Africa
- Rabat, Morocco
- Tripoli, Libya
- Tunis, Tunisia

=== Asia and Oceania ===
- Abu Dhabi, United Arab Emirates
- Baghdad, Iraq
- Beijing, China
- Beirut, Liban
- Damascus, Syria
- Jakarta, Indonesia
- Haifa, Israel
- Hong Kong, China
- Melbourne, Australia
- Mumbai, India
- New Delhi, India
- Osaka, Japan
- Seoul, South Korea
- Shanghai, China
- Sydney, Australia
- Tel Aviv, Israel
- Tokyo, Japan

=== Americas ===
- Bogotá, Colombia
- Buenos Aires, Argentina
- Caracas, Venezuela
- Chicago, United States
- Córdoba, Argentina
- Guatemala City, Guatemala
- Lima, Peru
- Los Angeles, United States
- Miami, United States
- Mexico City, Mexico
- Montevideo, Uruguay
- Montréal, Canada
- New York City, United States
- Rio de Janeiro, Brazil
- San Francisco, United States
- Santiago, Chile
- São Paulo, Brazil
- Toronto, Canada
- Washington D.C., United States

=== No longer active ===
- Accra, Ghana
- Ankara, Turkey
- Frankfurt, Germany
- Grenoble, France
- Innsbruck, Austria
- Kyoto, Japan
- Lille, France
- Luxembourg City, Luxembourg
- Mogadishu, Somalia
- Singapore, Singapore
- Thessaloniki, Greece
- Vancouver, Canada
- Wolfsburg, Germany

== See also ==
- Cultural Diplomacy
- Public diplomacy
- British Council
- Alliance Française
- Goethe-Institut
- Instituto Cervantes
