= Saddleback Mountain =

Saddleback Mountain (or just Saddleback) is the name of a number of mountains worldwide. It can also describe any mountain, hill or ridge having a concave outline at the top.

Mountains called Saddleback include:

== United States ==
By state (shown with USGS ID numbers)

- Saddleback Mountain, part of McDowell Mountains, Arizona
- Saddleback Butte (California), 248515
- Saddleback Mountain (Los Angeles County, California), 1765039
- Saddleback (Orange County, California)
- Saddleback Mountain (San Bernardino County, California), 248517
- Saddleback Mountain (Sierra County, California), 265713
- Saddleback Mountain (Clear Creek County, Colorado), 182070
- Saddleback Mountain (Conejos County, Colorado), 192922
- The Saddleback (York County, Maine), 576914
- The Saddleback (Oxford County, Maine), 576915
- Saddleback Junior, 574662
- Saddleback Mountain (Carthage, Maine), 574666
- Saddleback Mountain (Hancock County, Maine), 574667
- Saddleback Mountain (Rangeley, Maine), 574668
- Saddleback Mountain (Aroostook County, Maine), 574669
- Saddleback Mountain (Piscataquis County, Maine), 574670
- Mount Greylock, Massachusetts, known earlier as Saddleback Mountain
- Saddleback Butte (Montana), 776071
- Saddleback Mountain (Stillwater County, Montana), 789897
- Saddleback Mountain (Beaverhead County, Montana), 789898
- Saddleback Mountain (New Hampshire), 869672
- Saddleback Mountain (New Mexico), 910512
- Saddleback Mountain (Lewis, Essex County, New York), 963211
- Saddleback Mountain (Keene, New York), 970556
- Saddleback Mountain (Bandera County, Texas), 1345828
- Saddleback Mountain (Uvalde County, Texas), 1367106
- Saddleback Mountain (Vermont), 1459305
- Saddleback Mountain (Virginia), 1473684
- Saddleback Mountain (Laramie County, Wyoming), 1593743
- Saddleback Mountain (Converse County, Wyoming), 1602671

== Other countries ==
- Saddleback Mountain (New South Wales), Australia
- The Saddleback (Alberta), Banff National Park, Alberta, Canada
- Blencathra, also known as Saddleback, a mountain in Cumbria, England

== See also ==
- Saddleback (disambiguation)
