= Saddleback =

Saddleback may refer to:

== Fauna ==
- Saddleback (bird), two species of New Zealand bird of the family Callaeidae
  - North Island saddleback, the North Island species
  - South Island saddleback, the South Island species
- Saddleback caterpillar, Acharia stimulea, the larva of a species of moth native to eastern North America
- Saddleback clownfish, Amphiprion polymnus, a black and white species of anemonefish
- Saddleback seal, or harp seal, Pagophilus groenlandicus
- Saddleback toad, a genus of small, colourful toads the family Brachycephalidae
- British Saddleback, a modern British breed of domestic pig
- Wessex Saddleback, a breed of domestic pig originating in the West Country of England
- Angeln Saddleback, a rare breed of domestic pig grown mainly in Schleswig-Holstein, Germany

== Geographic features ==
- Saddleback Mountain (disambiguation), a number of mountains worldwide
- Saddleback Point, a headland on the northern coast of Elephant Island, in the South Shetland Islands of Antarctica
- Saddleback Valley, South Orange County, California, U.S.

== Institutions, schools, and organizations ==
- Saddleback Church, Lake Forest, California, U.S.
- Saddleback College, Mission Viejo, California, U.S.
- Saddleback High School, Santa Ana, California, U.S.
- Saddleback Valley Unified School District, South Orange County, California, U.S.

== Other uses ==
- Saddleback roof, usually on a tower, with a ridge and two sloping sides
- Saddleback Maine (ski resort), a ski area on Saddleback Mountain in Rangeley, Maine, U.S.

== See also ==
- Saddle (disambiguation)
- Lordosis, or saddle back, curvature of the lumbar and cervical regions of the human spine
- Saddle point in mathematics
- "Saddlebacking", a neologism for a sex act, popularised by the Savage Love newspaper column
