= Mark Francis (artist) =

Northern Irish painter (born 1962)

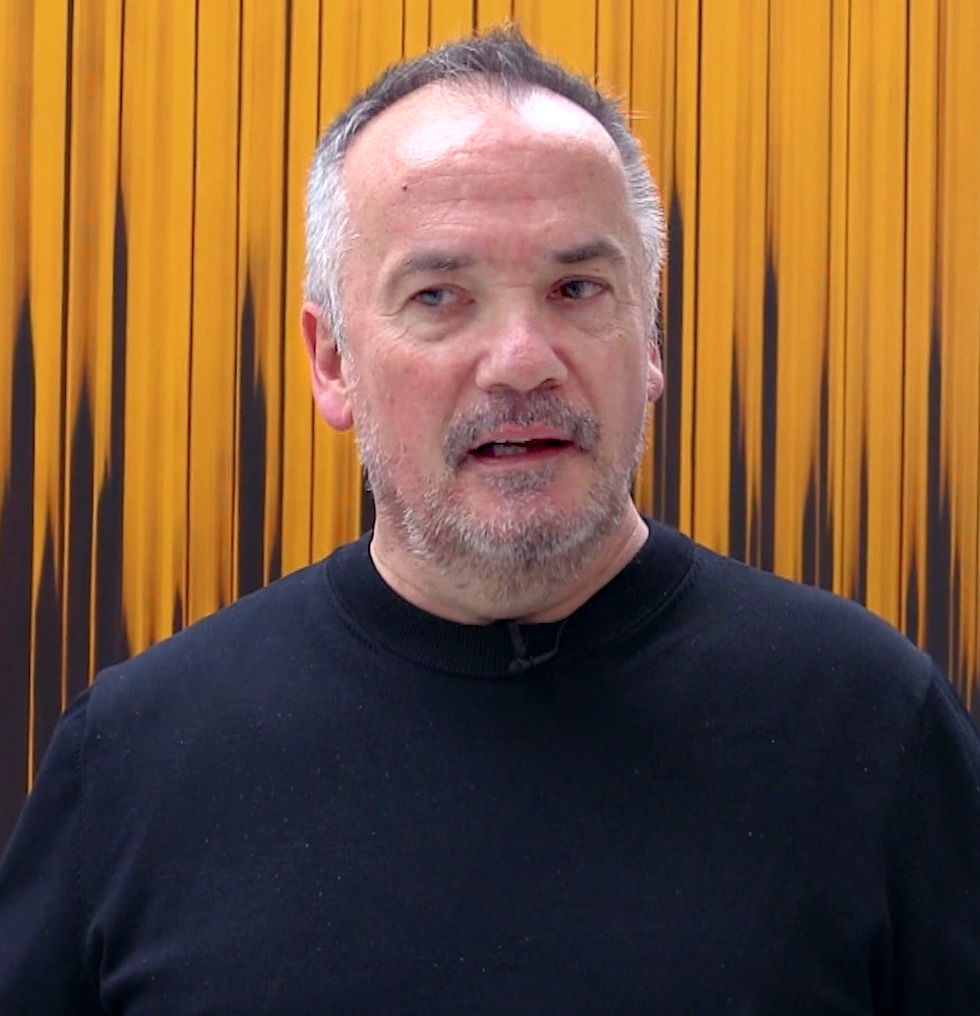
- Mark Francis interview, London, 2 March 2022
- Born: 1962 (age 63–64); Newtownards, Northern Ireland
- Education: St. Martin's School of Art (1980–85); Chelsea School of Art (MA, 1986)
- Known for: Abstract painting; optical patterning; grid formations
- Website: www.markfrancisstudio.com

Mark Francis (born 1962) is a Northern Irish painter living and working in London, England.

Mark Francis Pulse (Vibration), 1999

== Life and career ==
Francis was born in Newtownards, Northern Ireland and studied painting at St. Martin's School of Art (1980–85) before going on to the Chelsea School of Art where he completed his Master of Arts in painting in 1986. Francis has exhibited internationally both individually and in group exhibitions. Indeed, his "practice over the past thirty years has focused on making paintings with singular optical intensity — powerful, apparently abstract combinations of concentrated patterning and stark colour contrasts." As an emerging artist in 1995, Francis was involved in The Adventure of Painting at Kunstverein Düsseldorf/Stuttgart, Germany and From Here at the Karsten Schubert/Waddington Galleries in London. These shows were pivotal in questioning the role of contemporary painting both in Europe and the UK which consequently led Francis to show in prestigious exhibitions such as IMMA Glenn Dimplex Award exhibition Irish Museum of Modern Art (1996), Absolute Vision; New British Painting in the 1990s Museum of Modern Art Oxford (1996) and the infamous Sensation Young British Artists from the Saatchi Collection exhibition (1997). By the year 2000, Francis was invited to exhibit an early career overview Elements at Milton Keynes Gallery.

Over the last thirty years, Francis' work has had a strong association with science. Throughout his career, his abstract paintings have continually been informed by the shapes, patterns and visual qualities found by his personal interest in mycology. It is through this abstract language that Francis initiated his platform in the early 1990s to become one of the UK's leading contemporary painters and maintains to be at the forefront of critical evaluation within art shown in publications such as Painting Today.

Francis is often characterised by his wet-on-wet painting technique (a technique also used by Gerhard Richter in the 1960s) and his continuous use of grid formations that are present within his paintings. Francis explores the notion of chaos and order through the idea of mapping and how seemingly chaotic and random formations can have a larger, almost incomprehensible working logic. He has moved his research from micro to macro with particular interest in astronomical formations using the process and concept of mapping to combine, connect, mark, relate and explore.

More recently in 2008, Francis' work in Pulse Dublin City Gallery The Hugh Lane marked a crucial move into his work being shown in a public space in a solo exhibition and has continued to show in the public domain with Arena at Abbot Hall Art Gallery, Kendal in 2010.

Francis' work is collected by numerous institutions and organisations that include the Irish Museum of Modern Art, the Tate and is represented by Kerlin Gallery, Bernhard Knaus Fine Art, Luca Tommasi Arte Contemporanea, and Fox Jensen Sydney and Fox Jensen McCrory, Auckland.

In 2026 Mark Francis represented San Marino at the 61st Venice Biennale. In 2027 a major solor exhibition will be shown at Museum Küppersmühle in Duisburg.
