= Italian Cultural Institute, London =

Coordinates: 51°29′58.7″N 0°9′6.64″W

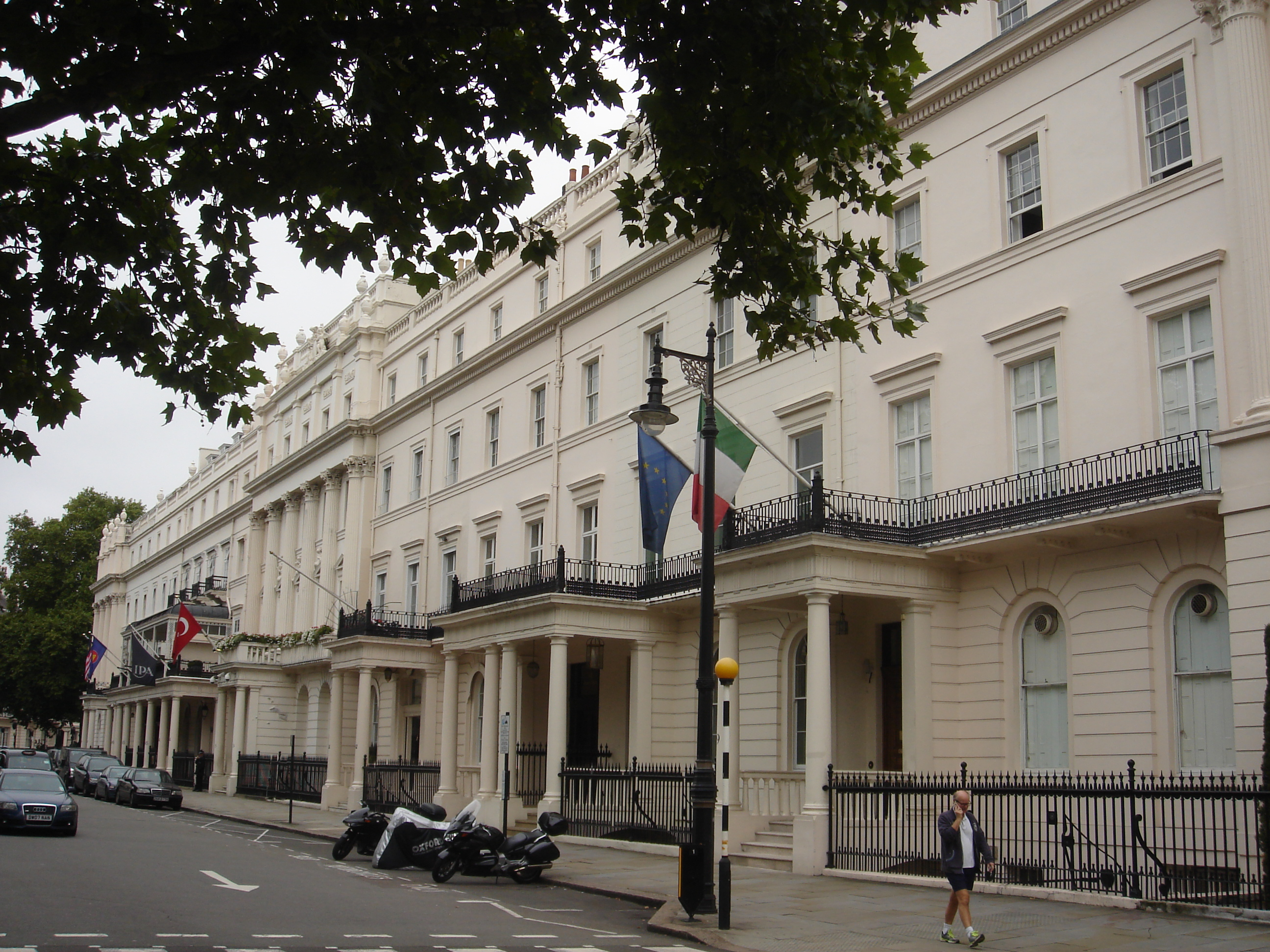

The Italian Cultural Institute, London (Italian: Istituto Italiano di Cultura) is based at 39 Belgrave Square in Belgravia, London. The institute promotes Italian culture and organises events at its own premises including exhibitions, concerts and meetings. It also supports the learning of Italian language through the set-up of group lessons. It deals with many activities elsewhere in UK. There are a library, an internal café and other facilities available for those who are involved in its activities. Various types of membership are available for individuals and organisations.
