= Dorothy Cross =

Irish artist

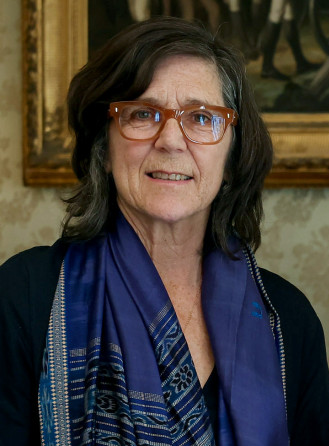
- Cross in 2025
- Born: 1956 (age 69–70); Cork, Ireland
- Education: Crawford Municipal School of Art, San Francisco Art Institute
- Notable work: Ghost Ship
- Awards: 1993 Venice Biennale
- Website: http://www.kerlin.ie/artists/dorothy-cross

Dorothy Cross (born 1956) is an Irish artist. Working with differing media, including sculpture, photography, video and installation, she represented Ireland at the 1993 Venice Biennale. Central to her work as a whole are themes of sexual and cultural identity, personal history, memory, and the gaps between the conscious and subconscious. In a 2009 speech by the president of UCC, Cross was described as "one of Ireland's leading artists".

== Early life and education ==
Cross was born in 1956 in Cork, Ireland, one of three children of Fergus and Dorothy Cross. Her older brother Tom went on to become a zoologist and professor at University College Cork, while her older sister Jane was a swimmer who was on a team that set a world relay record at the 1985 World Masters Championships. Cross herself was a competitive swimmer in her teens, becoming All-Ireland champion in the 100-meter breaststroke at the age of 15 and going on to win other medals over the next few years.

Cross attended the Crawford Municipal School of Art in Cork before undertaking degree studies at Leicester Polytechnic, England, from 1974 to 1977. She also studied at the San Francisco Art Institute, California, from 1978 to 1979 and from 1980 to 1982, where she completed an MFA Degree in printmaking.

== Career ==
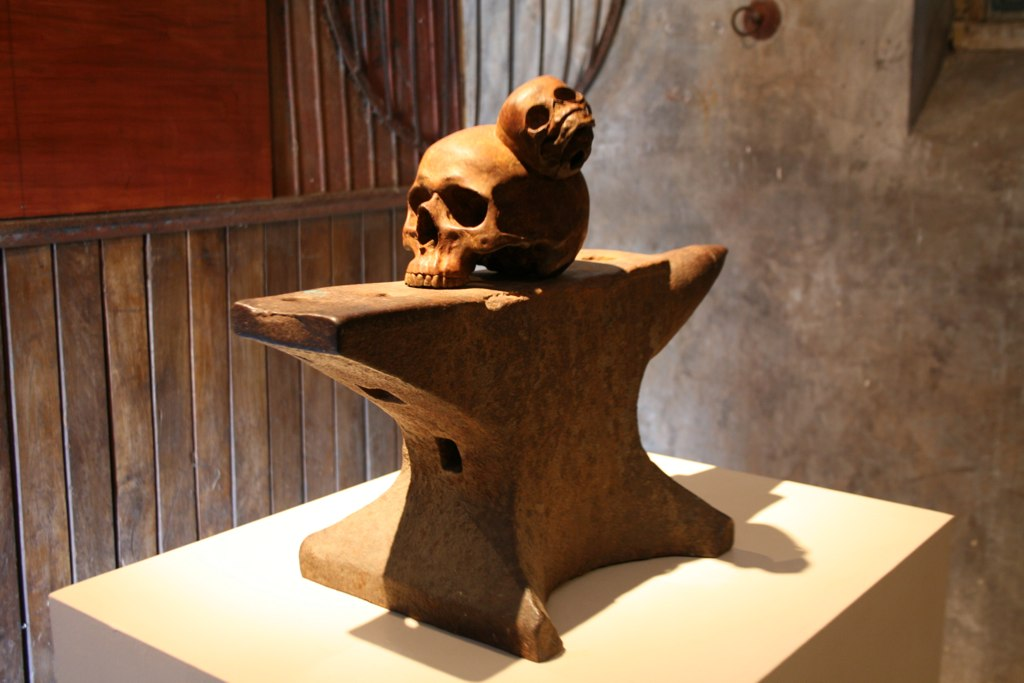
'Forge', a sculpture by Dorothy Cross.

Exhibiting regularly since the mid-1980s, Cross came to mainstream public attention with her first major solo installation, 'Ebb', at the Douglas Hyde Gallery in Dublin, Ireland. This was followed, in 1991, by 'Powerhouse', at the ICA in Philadelphia, the Hyde Gallery and Camden Arts Centre in London and Kerlin Gallery in Dublin. Like 'Ebb', several of the component parts that made up 'Powerhouse' were 'found' objects - many of which had been in her family's possession for years or were located in different environments. These were then incorporated into mixed media pieces for exhibit. Cross's general approach of creating works using found objects has been referred to as "poetic amalgamation".

During the early 1990s, Cross witnessed a traditional sieve created from a stretched cow's udder at a local museum in Norway and stated, "Seeing that a cow could be used for something other than producing milk was a total revelation." In response, she began producing sculptural works, utilising cured cowhide, cow udders and stuffed snakes, which explored the cultural and symbolic significance of sexuality and subjectivity across cultures. For Cross, the use of udders generated a strange mixture of disgust, hilarity, and excitement. Virgin Shroud (1993), for example, is a veil made from cow skin, with the udders forming a crown for the concealed figure; it references both the Virgin Mary and Meret Oppenheim's fur-lined teacup that was a partial inspiration for the piece. Saddle (also 1993) incorporates an upturned udder into the seat of a horse's saddle.

Cross is perhaps best known for her public installation Ghost Ship (1998) in which a disused light ship was illuminated through the use of luminous paint, in Scotman's Bay, off Dublin's Dún Laoghaire Harbour. A recent series, Medusae, includes images of Chironex fleckeri, a type of jellyfish and was made in collaboration with her brother Tom.

The Irish Museum of Modern Art held a major retrospective of her work in 2005.

An exhibition, 'View', that took place between September and November 2014 at the Kerlin Gallery in Dublin, Ireland, included a series of new sculptures and photographs. The works, which are exemplary of the artist's complex exploration of the connection between humans and the natural world, and that play with material, relationship and time, capture the artist's ongoing compulsion to agitate possibilities for new perspectives and points of view.

Cross was selected to be part of the curated 'Indra's Net' programme at the 2022 Frieze Art Fair in London.

== Exhibitions ==
=== Selected solo shows ===
- 1988 Douglas Hyde Gallery, Dublin - 'Ebb'
- 1991 ICA, Philadelphia, Hyde Gallery & Camden Art's Centre, London, Kerlin Gallery, Dublin - 'Powerhouse'
- 1991 Camden Arts Centre, London - 'Parthenon'
- 1996 Arnolfini Gallery, Bristol - 'Even: Recent Work by Dorothy Cross'
- 1997 Angles Gallery, Los Angeles
- 1998 Project Arts Centre, Dublin, Off Site Project, St Enda's, Galway - 'Chiasm'
- 2000 Mimara Museum, Zagreb
- 2001 Frith Street Gallery, London
- 2002 Kerlin Gallery
- 2005 McMullen Museum of Art, Chestnut Hill - 'GONE: Site-Specific Works by Dorothy Cross'
- 2005 Irish Museum of Modern Art, Dublin
- 2008 Antarctica, Wolverhampton Art Gallery, Wolverhampton
- 2009 Coma, Bloomberg Space, London
- 2011 Stalactite, Heineken Ireland, former Beamish and Crawford Gallery, Cork
- 2013 Connemara, Turner Contemporary, UK
- 2014 Kerlin Gallery

== Honours and awards ==
In 2009, Cross was awarded an honorary doctorate by University College Cork.

In 2022, she was awarded an honorary doctorate by Trinity College Dublin.

During her years in the United States, she won a prestigious Pollock-Krasner Award (1990). Her work has been supported by grants from the Wellcome Trust, the Arts Council of Ireland and Arts Council of England.

== Works in collections ==
- Irish Museum of Modern Art, Dublin
- The Norton Collection, Santa Monica
- Art Pace Foundation, Texas
- The Goldman Sachs Collection, London
- Tate Modern, London, including Virgin Shroud (1993)
- Hugh Lane Gallery, Dublin
- Arts Council of Ireland
- Museum of Fine Arts Houston

== Bibliography ==
- Allen Randolph, Jody. "Dorothy Cross." Close to the Next Moment: Interviews from a Changing Ireland. Manchester: Carcanet, 2010.
- Lydenberg, Robin. Gone: Site Specific Works by Dorothy Cross. Chicago: University of Chicago Press, 2005.
- Cross, Dorothy, Enrique Juncosa, and Sean Kissane. Dorothy Cross. Milano Dublin: Charta Irish Museum of Modern Art, 2005. ISBN 9788881585335
- "Heat and Cold: Projects by Dorothy Cross and Lewis deSoto at ArtPace in San Antonio." tate: the art magazine. Winter 1996.
- Wilson, Claire. "Irish Eyes." Art and Antiques. Summer 1996.
- Isaak, Jo Anna. "Laughter Ten Years After." Art in America. December, 1995.
- Higgins, Judith. "Art from the Edge." Art in America. December, 1995.
- Murdoch, Sadie. "Too Much of a Good Thing." Women's Art Magazine. July–August, 1995.
- Cross, Dorothy, and Melissa E. Feldman. Dorothy Cross: power house. Philadelphia, Pa: Institute of Contemporary Art, University of Pennsylvania, 1991. ISBN 9780884540632
