= Saddle (artwork) =

Artwork by Dorothy Cross

Coordinates: 53.3400°N 6.2997°W

Saddle - Dorothy Cross (1993)

Saddle is a 1993 surrealist sculpture by Irish artist Dorothy Cross. It is in the collection of the Irish Museum of Modern Art having been acquired in 1994. It is created by the combination of found objects - specifically a metal frame, a horse's saddle and an upturned cow's udder. Virgin's Shroud, another work by Cross from 1993, also features cow's udders and is in the collection of the Tate.

It was perhaps no surprise to soon come upon the Freudian play of Dorothy Cross’ Saddle...There is something doubly unsettling about udders. On the one hand they remind me of large elongated nipples, which they are, and on the other they have a resemblance of a small thick penis. The Saddle also has a reference to the arse and so, all in all, the piece has a fascinating desire to confuse and unsettle, to engage and perturb.

— Steffan Jones-Hughes,
