= Saddle tank =

Saddle tank may refer to:

- Saddle tank (locomotive), a water tank carried above the boiler of a steam locomotive; also the type name of a locomotive so fitted.
- Saddle tank (submarine), an early type of ballast tank
- Two "Saddle tanks" are often used by Semi-trailer trucks.
