= Aleana Egan =

Irish visual artist, b. 1979

Aleana Egan (born 1979) is an Irish sculptor.

== Career ==
Egan was born in Dublin in 1979. Having attended Senior College, Dún Laoghaire–Rathdown she went on to graduate with a BA (Hons) in Fine Art and Painting from Glasgow School of Art in 2003. As of January 2019 Egan was based in Dublin.

In 2026, Egan presented the site-responsive solo exhibition A Maritime Child at Interface in Lough Inagh, Connemara, presented as part of the Galway International Arts Festival. The exhibition was curated by Michael Hill, who previously co-curated Ireland's national pavilion at the 59th Venice Biennale.

== Works/Exhibitions ==
- 'Shapes from Life' – 2015 – Douglas Hyde Gallery, Trinity College, Dublin
- Piece for "two birds/one stone" – 2016 – Farmleigh Gallery, Dublin
- 2017 – Konrad Fischer Galerie, Berlin, Germany
- 'Pearl Blauvelt/Aleana Egan' – 2018 – Mary, Mary, Glasgow, United Kingdom
- 'Bronze Loops' – 2018 – Kerlin Gallery, Dublin
- 2018 Merrion Square Park, Dublin
