= Gavin Delahunty =

- Occupation(s): Former Hoffman Family Senior Curator of Contemporary Art, Dallas Museum of Art

Gavin Delahunty is an Irish curator and was the Hoffman Family Senior Curator of Contemporary Art at the Dallas Museum of Art. Delahunty joined the DMA staff in May 2014 and resigned in November 2017, citing 'allegations of inappropriate behavior'.

== Education ==
Delahunty holds a Master of Arts degree in Criticism, Visual Arts Practices from the Institute of Art, Design & Technology, Dublin (2004), and a Bachelor of Arts degree in Fine Art, Print from Crawford College of Art & Design, Cork, Ireland (1999).

== Career ==
Prior to working at the Dallas Museum of Art (DMA), Delahunty was Head of Exhibitions and Displays at Tate Liverpool , where from 2010, he managed the exhibition program and curated a number of exhibitions. From 2007 through 2010, he served as Curator at Middlesbrough Institute of Modern Art (mima). He has worked for several important institutions over the course of his career, including the Irish Museum of Modern Art, the Douglas Hyde Gallery, Project Arts Centre, and Modern Art Oxford.

== Selected exhibitions ==
- Carey Young: The New Architecture. Dallas Museum of Art, 2017.
- Walter De Maria: Counterpoint. Dallas Museum of Art, 2016–2017.
- Rebecca Warren: The Main Feeling. Dallas Museum of Art, 2016.
- Jackson Pollock: Blind Spots. Tate Liverpool, 2015; Dallas Museum of Art, 2015–2016.
- Bold Abstractions: Selections from the DMA Collection, 1966–1976. Dallas Museum of Art, 2015.
- Frank Bowling: Map Paintings. Dallas Museum of Art, 2015.
- The Museum is History. Dallas Museum of Art, 2014.
- Keywords: Art, Culture & Society in 1980s Britain. Tate Liverpool, 2014.
- Tracing an Outline: Drawing as a Catalyst for Change. Tate Liverpool, 2012; Middlesbrough Institute of Modern Art, 2013.
- Charline von Heyl: Now or Else. Tate Liverpool, 2012; Kunsthalle Nuremberg, 2012.
- Alice in Wonderland: Through the Visual Arts. Tate Liverpool, 2011–2012; Museum of Modern and Contemporary Art of Trento and Rovereto (MART) and the Kunsthalle Hamburg, 2012.
- A Certain Distance, Endless Light: A Project by Felix Gonzalez-Torres & William McKeown. Middlesbrough Institute of Modern Art, 2010.
- Ellsworth Kelly: Drawings 1954–62. Middlesbrough Institute of Modern Art, 2010; The Hugh Lane Gallery, Dublin, 2010.
- Gerhard Richter: Lines which do not exist. The Drawing Center, New York, 2010.
- Katy Moran: Paintings. Middlesbrough Institute of Modern Art, 2008–2009.
- British Surrealism & Other Realities. Middlesbrough Institute of Modern Art, 2008.

== Selected acquisitions ==
Stephen Antonakos, Michael Armitage, Nora Aslan, Robert Barry, Kevin Beasley, Frank Bowling, Nina Canell, Ann Craven, Walter De Maria, Melvin Edwards, Sam Gilliam, Michelle Grabner, Giorgio Griffa, Jacqueline Humphries, Merlin James, Nadia Kaabi-Linke, Sarah Lucas, William McKeown, Julie Mehretu, Jackson Pollock, Alejandro Puente, Lina Puerta, Joan Semmel, Keith Sonnier, Haim Steinbach, Rebecca Warren, and Jonas Wood.

== Selected publications ==
- Counterpoint: Sculpture, Music, and Walter De Maria's Large Rod Series, Gavin Delahunty, ed., Yale University Press, 2017.
- Delahunty, Gavin. "Contingent Geometries". Geometries on and off the Grid: Art from 1950 to the Present. Ed. Allan Schwartzman. Published by The Warehouse, Dallas, 2016.
- Jackson Pollock: Blind Spots, Gavin Delahunty, ed., Tate Publishing, 2015.
- Delahunty, Gavin. "Memory Recorded and Transferred". Ellsworth Kelly. Phaidon, 2015.
- Delahunty, Gavin. "Words as Poems, Matter as Sculpture". Carl Andre. Poems. JRP|Ringier, 2014.
- Delahunty, Gavin. "In a Mirror, Dimly". Microtome: Pádraig Timoney. Mondadori Electa S.p.A., 2014.
- Delahunty, Gavin. “Carl Andre: Poems”. “Artforum International”, Summer 2013.
- Charline von Heyl: Now or Else, Gavin Delahunty, ed., Tate Publishing, 2012.
- Delahunty, Gavin. "Lines which do not exist", Gerhard Richter: Lines which do not exist. The Drawing Center, 2010.
- Delahunty, Gavin. "Railway Mania." Bonnie Camplin: Railway Mania. Middlesbrough Institute of Modern Art, 2010.
