= Golden Thread Gallery =

Contemporary art gallery in Belfast, Northern Ireland

Coordinates: 54.604°N 5.925°W

The Golden Thread Gallery is a contemporary art gallery in Belfast, Northern Ireland. It hosts contemporary art exhibitions by a mix of Northern Irish and international artists, alongside workshops, artist talks, events and community outreach. The gallery moved to a new city-centre location in August 2024, the former Gas Corporation Showroom and Craftworld building at 23-29 Queen Street. Set across two floors, the gallery's new venue includes 2 large galleries, a projection room, a Community Participation & Engagement Hub, and Northern Ireland’s first visual art library & archive. Entry to the gallery is free.

The Golden Thread Gallery was established in 1998 by artist Gail Prentice in a former linen mill on an 'interface area' (an area where segregated nationalist and unionist residential areas meet) in North Belfast. In 2001, it was reconstituted to become the Golden Thread Gallery Ltd., a limited company with charitable status. In 2002, Peter Richards, artist and curator, was appointed as the gallery's new director. In 2007, Sarah McAvera joined the gallery team and in 2024 became Co-Director with Peter Richards.

The gallery has exhibited work by significant contemporary artists including Steve McQueen, Tracey Emin, Suzanne Lacy, Locky Morris, Paul Seawright, Juno Calypso, John Akomfrah, Susan Hiller, Niamh O'Malley, Graham Fagen and Alice Maher.

Gallery outreach activities include working off-site and in partnership with communities and groups, devising creative projects aimed at enhancing wellbeing and community cohesion through art. The gallery also publishes exhibition catalogues and books, including the Collective Histories of Northern Irish Art series.

In recent years the Golden Thread Gallery has been working with a number of artists living and working in Northern Ireland to create a “not-for-profit” form of artists’ representation and has championed their work at art fairs such as the London Art Fair, Berliner Liste and Scope New York. Golden Thread Gallery is a member of Plus Tate, a network of contemporary art galleries and organisations based throughout the UK.

The Golden Thread Gallery is a charity and is principally funded by the Arts Council of Northern Ireland, National Lottery and Belfast City Council.

== Staff ==
- Co-Director - Peter Richards
- Co-Director - Sarah McAvera
- Exhibitions Officer - Mary Stevens
- Development Manager - Liz Byrne
- Outreach - Katharine Paisley
- Audience Development Assistant - Chloe Doherty
