= Isabel Nolan =

Irish artist

- Born: 1974 (age 51–52); Dublin, Ireland
- Website: www.isabelnolan.com

Isabel Nolan (born 1974) is an Irish contemporary artist who works with sculpture, textile, photographs, and text. Nolan lives and works in Dublin.

== Work ==
Nolan, according to a review of her work in Frieze Magazine, works similarly to Eva Berendes, Nicholas Byrne and Richard Wright, by using pre-modern pattern-making and craftsmanship to re-investigate the importance of making. Nolan frequently makes reference to the aesthetics of cosmology. The work is often the result of a slow and deliberate process, matching pattern with En elusive sense of order. Nolan's work often has its origins in literary works, such as Thomas Hardy's poem The Darkling Thrush that provided the title for The Weakened Eye of Day, a work she conceived for the Irish Museum of Modern Art in 2014. As part of The Weakened Eye of Day, she wrote a piece of "speculative fiction" in the form of an online audio work called The Three Body Problem.

== Career ==
Her work has been shown in the Irish Museum of Modern Art, the Musée d’art moderne de Saint Etienne in France, the Kunstverein Graz, Austria in 2017 and the sculpture park Château La Coste near Aix-en-Provence, France in 2023. There have also been solo exhibitions of her work in other European galleries as well as in Canada at the Contemporary Art Gallery (Vancouver) and the Mercer Union, Toronto in 2016.

Nolan's Turning Point on display in Terminal 2 of Dublin Airport

In 2005, Nolan was one of six artists who represented Ireland in a group presentation at the 51st Venice Biennale. She returned to the 61st Venice Biennale in 2026 as Ireland's sole representative with the solo exhibition Dreamshook, curated by Georgina Jackson with The Douglas Hyde Gallery of Contemporary Art and commissioned by Culture Ireland and The Arts Council. It is an installation of sculpture, drawings and tapestry, themed around the power of the written word. It draws inspiration from the life of the Renaissance publisher Aldus Manutius who aimed to print lost classical texts, and her optimistic hope that books and knowledge can inform debate even through turmoil and strife to produce a better world. The exhibition includes a central tapestry (The Dreams of Reason Produce Monsters (the Seraphim of the Canon)) showing Manutius's quest coming to him in a dream. Images of winged books appear in several of the pieces including a sculpture, Dreamshook, after which the exhibition is named.

A comprehensive solo exhibition of her work is planned for the Southwark Park Galleries, London from 15 August until 1 November 2026.

== Bibliography ==
- Nolan, Isabel. Isabel Nolan: intimately unrelated = intimement sans rapport. Sligo Saint Etienne: The Model Musée d'Art Moderne, 2011. ISBN 978-0-9567179-1-7
- Nolan, Isabel. Some surfaces on which patterns occur. Onestar Press, 2013.
- Nolan, Isabel. Curling up with reality. Dublin: Launchpad and Kerlin Gallery, 2020. ISBN 9780957007093
