= Peter Richards (artist) =

Welsh-born Irish artist

Peter Richards is a Welsh-born Irish artist and curator. Early in his career he worked primarily on video art and installations, later also working in performance art. Richards is living and working in Belfast, Northern Ireland, since 1994.

Early in his career Richards was producing predominantly video art works. These works generally took the form of single-channel installations, featuring the artist perform to camera, such as his "Untitled: table & chair". In the mid-1990s he began creating performance art works and photographic documentation of the performance art as a single entity. He also created a series of "collective histories" of performance art works. Richards has worked on the subject of 'memorials' in Northern Ireland. He has exhibited extensively nationally and internationally most notably participating in first presentation at the Venice Biennale in 2005.
