= Kerlin Gallery =

Contemporary art gallery in Dublin, Ireland

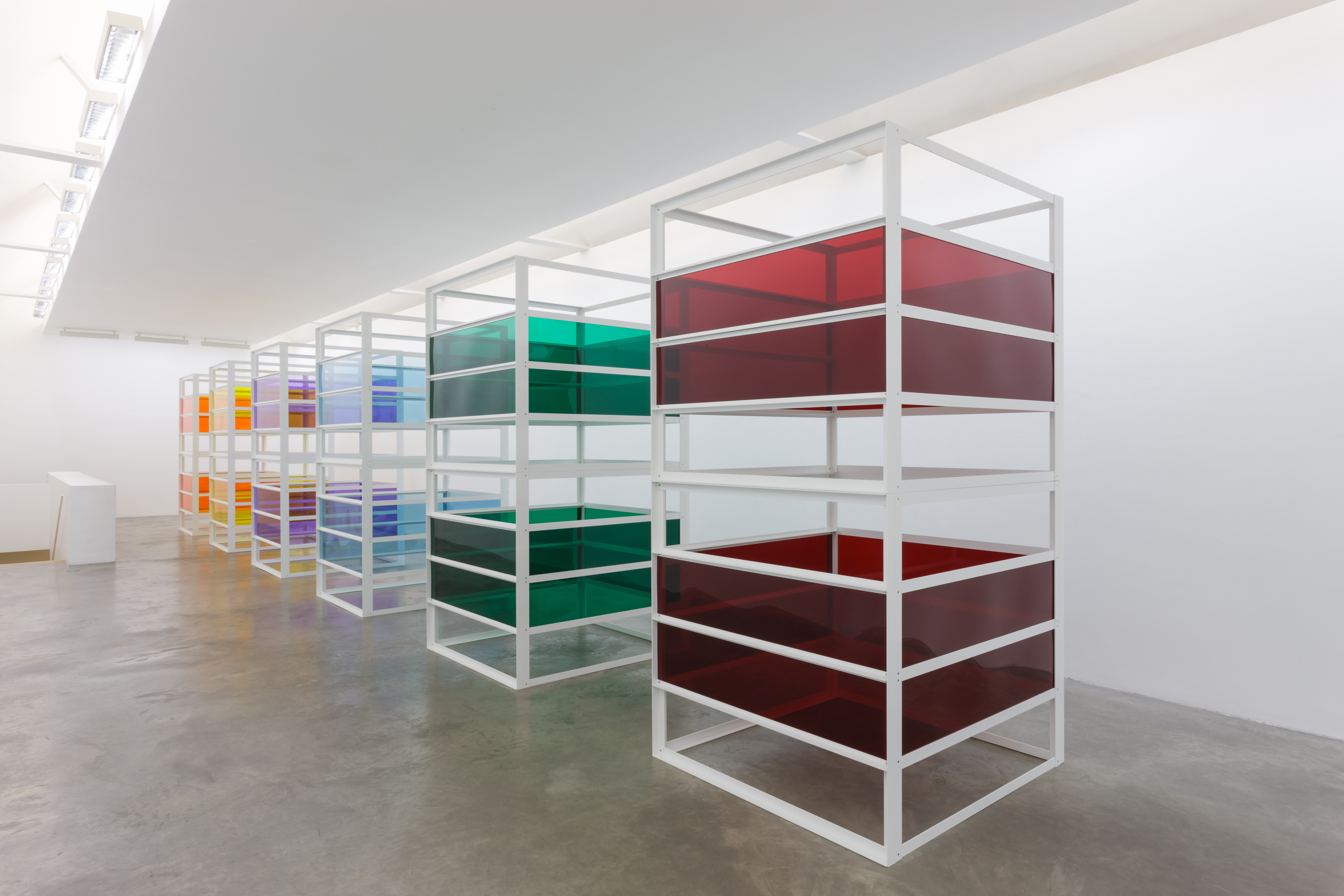
- Complete Bin Development 2013, by Liam Gillick, at the gallery

- Location within Central Dublin
- Established: 1988
- Location: Anne's Lane, South Anne Street, Dublin, Ireland
- Coordinates: 53.340689°N 6.259553°W
- Type: Contemporary art gallery
- Directors: David Fitzgerald, Darragh Hogan, John Kennedy
- Owners: Co-ownership by David Fitzgerald, Darragh Hogan, John Kennedy, and Paddy McKillen
- Public transit access: Stephen's Green Luas stop (Green Line); College Green bus stops
- Website: kerlin.ie

Kerlin Gallery is a commercial contemporary art gallery in Dublin, Ireland. Originally opened in 1988, it is located on Anne's Lane (off South Anne Street) in Dublin city centre.

== History ==
Originally opened in 1988, the gallery's current space was designed in 1994 by architect John Pawson. It is located in central Dublin and has 3,600 sq ft (330 m^{2}) of gallery space spread over two floors. In 2015, the Artnet website included the gallery in a list of "Europe’s Top 55 Galleries". David Fitzgerald, Darragh Hogan, and John Kennedy are the gallery's directors.

In 2018, the gallery donated a number of works to the Irish Museum of Modern Art.

== Selected exhibitions ==
Kerlin Gallery programs eight exhibitions annually, predominantly solo exhibitions by gallery artists with occasional curated group exhibitions and solo exhibitions by invited artists. In some cases, the gallery has presented multiple solo exhibitions by the same artist. These have included Sean Scully (seven times since 1994), Dorothy Cross (nine times since 1990), Mark Francis (ten times since 1995), Willie Doherty (ten times since 1995), and Elizabeth Magill (eight times since 1989). The gallery also takes on new artists, and presented its first solo exhibitions by Ailbhe Ní Bhriain in 2023, Nathalie Du Pasquier and Zhou Li in 2022, and Gerard Byrne in 2018.

Curated group exhibitions have included "HERE COMES LOVE" (14 July – 19 August 2023), featuring works by Justin Fitzpatrick (who held his first institutional solo exhibition at The Tetley in 2021), Sam Keogh (exhibited at IMMA and Douglas Hyde Gallery), Jennifer Mehigan (Douglas Hyde Gallery 2, transmediale Berlin), Tai Shani (co-winner of the 2019 Turner Prize), and Lee Welch (with institutional exhibitions including the Hugh Lane Gallery, MUSAC, Eli and Edythe Broad Art Museum, and Objectif Exhibitions); "Face to Face" (2018) (curated by Hendrik Driesson, founding director of De Pont Museum of Contemporary Art), "Architecture Schmarchitecture" (2003) (with Isa Genzken, Liam Gillick, Roger Hiorns, Jim Lambie, Sarah Morris and Thomas Scheibitz), and "Newfound Landscape" (1998) (with Uta Barth, Oliver Boberg, Walter Niedermayer, and Esko Manniko). In 2019, the gallery organised Shadowplay with Willie Doherty, Aleana Egan, Liam Gillick, Siobhán Hapaska, and Callum Innes. The title is derived from the song of the same name on Joy Division's Unknown Pleasures album.

In 2021, it presented a solo exhibition by the conceptual artist Lawrence Weiner. Other invited artists, exhibited at the gallery, have included Andy Warhol, Hiroshi Sugimoto, Richard Hamilton, Francesco Clemente, Martin Kippenberger, Albert Oehlen and A.R. Penck.

== Publications ==
The gallery is involved in publishing artist publications, including monographs on the Welsh artist Merlin James and the Northern Irish painter William McKeown in 2023, the Irish artist Isabel Nolan in 2020, and the Irish painter Brian Maguire in 2018.
