= Ormeau Baths Gallery =

Bath house, later art gallery, in Belfast, Northern Ireland

Coordinates: 54.593°N 5.929°W

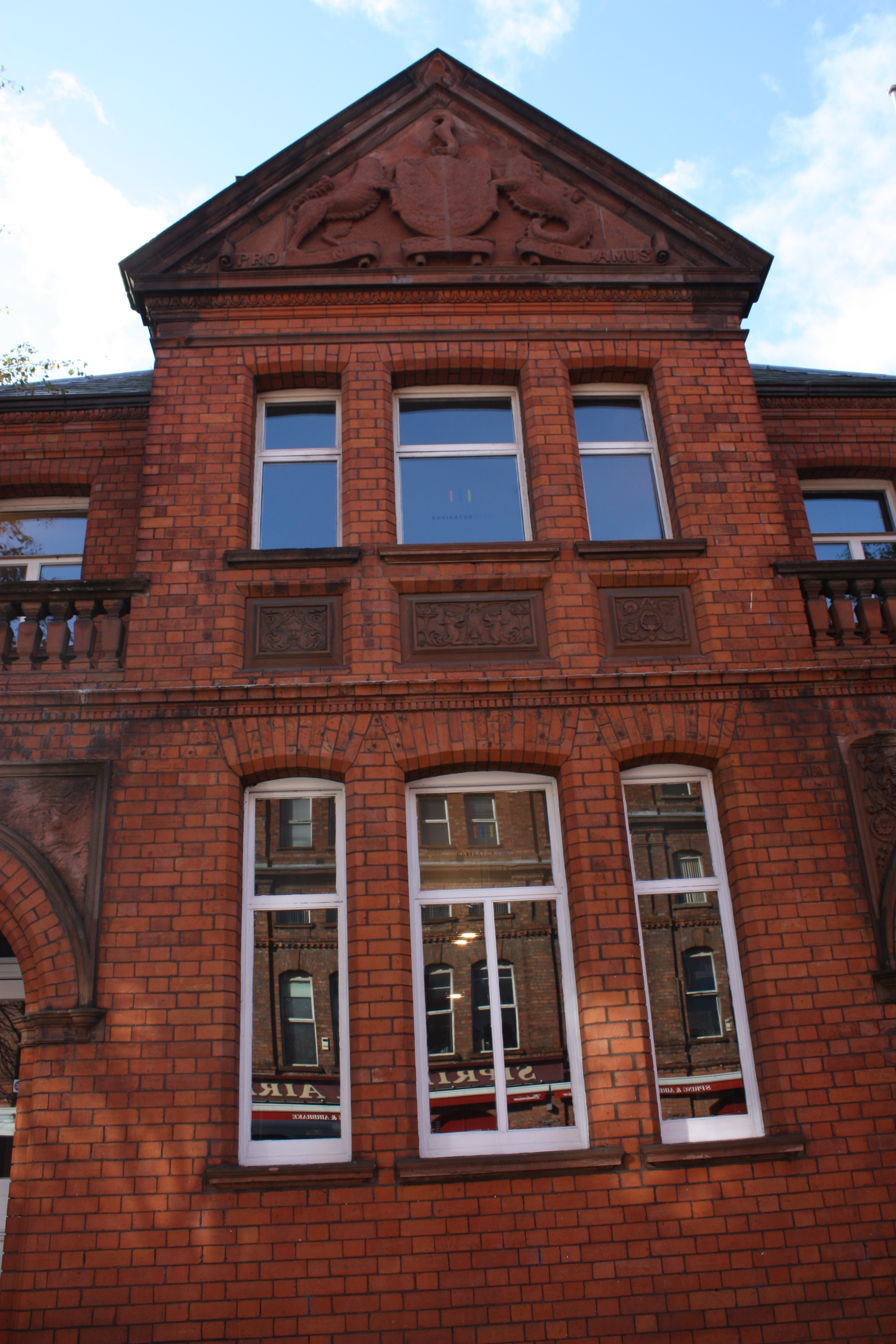
Ormeau Baths Gallery, Ormeau Avenue, Belfast

The Ormeau Baths in Belfast, Northern Ireland, now a home to tech and digital businesses in a modern contemporary building, was one of Ireland's premier contemporary art spaces. It curated exhibitions by prominent international artists including; Yoko Ono, Gilbert & George, Victor Sloan, Bill Viola, Hans Peter Kuhn, Stan Douglas, David Byrne, Willie Doherty and Alastair MacLennan.

There were four main galleries with a total exhibition space of 10,000 square feet (1,000 m^{2}). It was located on the site of a Victorian Bath House. In 1995, its conversion to an art gallery once again restored the venue to the public realm. Hugh Mulholland, previously the founder and Director of Context Gallery in Derry, was the Director of the Ormeau Baths Gallery from 1997 until the gallery's closure in 2006. The gallery programme included a mix of solo and group shows; national and international in all art disciplines.

== 2006 gallery closure ==
The gallery received its core funding from the Arts Council of Northern Ireland and Belfast City Council, but in a surprise move, the Arts Council suddenly announced at the end of February 2006 that it was not going to renew its funding, and that the gallery would close and all its staff be made redundant four days later.

A silent protest vigil of Irish artist and gallery supporters was held outside the locked gallery at 1pm on 1 March 2006. Over 100 people braved the snow showers to protest at the sudden closure. The Arts Council responded to a number of questions posed by gallery staff, but failed to substantiate allegations they had made prior to the closure. A public meeting was held on Saturday 4 March 2006 at 2pm at Belfast Exposed photo gallery to allow interested parties to get more information on the circumstances relating to the closure.

== Relaunch and final closure ==
The gallery was temporarily reopened to the public under Arts Council control on 9 June 2006, showing the Collectors' Collections of international art held in private and public collections across the island of Ireland. It closed again on 28 October 2011, but was relaunched in April 2007 under the leadership of a new independent board, led by Professor Kerstin Mey of the University of Ulster.

The final closure of the gallery was announced in October 2011. In a statement, the board cited "the high operating costs of the gallery, a general rise in exhibition expenses and more recently, a reduction in income from sponsorship, and corporate events held in the gallery", and expressed its thanks to the Arts Council of Northern Ireland and Belfast City Council for their financial support over the years.

Relaunch in 2017 as a modern contemporary workspace for digital and tech businesses in Belfast
