= Aperto '93 =

1993 contemporary art exhibition in Venice, Italy

Coordinates: 45°26′10″N 12°21′26″E

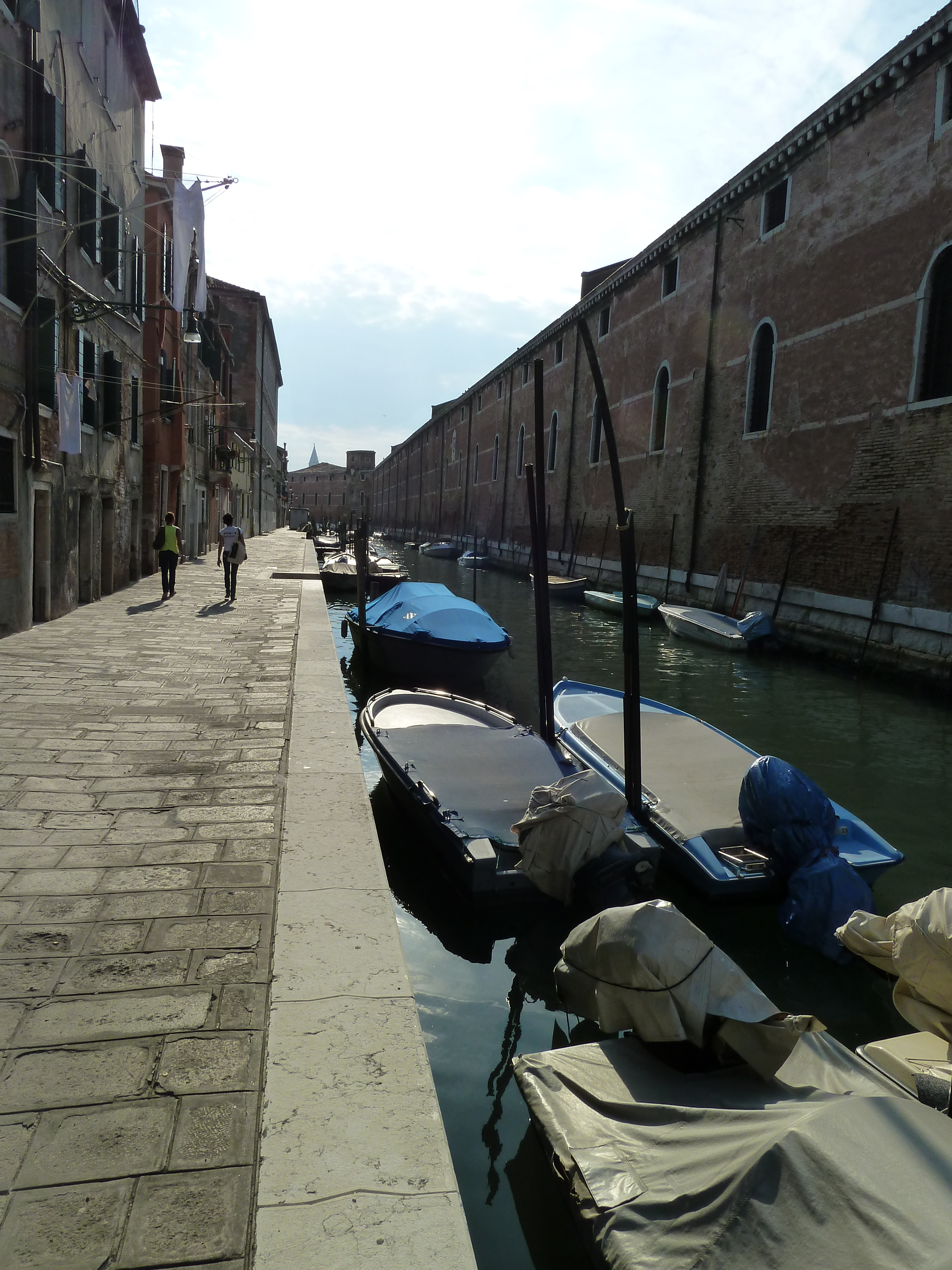
The Arsenale in Venice where the exhibition Aperto '93 took place.

Aperto ’93 was a contemporary art exhibition conceived by Helena Kontova and Giancarlo Politi, and organized by Helena Kontova for the XLV edition of the Venice Biennale, directed by Achille Bonito Oliva in 1993. It reprised and expanded the concept of the exhibition Aperto, a new section in the Biennale for young artists ideated by Bonito Oliva and Harald Szeemann in 1980.

== Concept and realisation ==
The show, entitled “Emergency/Emergenze,” signified a shift in the history of exhibition making. Instead of proposing a vision developed by a single curator – or curatorial team – Aperto ’93 proposed a rhizomic or cellular model. In this model different points of view related to the then emerging scene, deeply influenced by the process of globalization, underlined the necessity of coexistence and cohabitation and furthermore a fragmentation of the way to think and criticize visual art.

The curators altered the emphasis from a mere section into a "show within a show," featuring works by 120 artists including: Laura Aguilar, Matthew Barney, Henry Bond, Christine Borland, Maurizio Cattelan, Collection Yoon Ja & Paul Devautour, John Currin, Sylvie Fleury, Dominique Gonzalez-Foerster, Felix Gonzalez-Torres, Lothar Hempel, Damien Hirst, Carsten Höller, Sean Landers, Paul McCarthy, Gabriel Orozco, Philippe Parreno, Simon Patterson, Charles Ray, Pipilotti Rist, Andres Serrano, Kiki Smith, Rudolf Stingel, Rirkrit Tiravanija, Andrea Zittel, Wu Shanzhuan, Wang Youshen, Emmanuel Kane Kuei and Botala Tala.

The exhibition consisted of 13 sections, each managed by then-emerging curators such as Francesco Bonami, Nicolas Bourriaud, Kong Changan, Antonio D'Avossa, Jeffrey Deitch, Thomas Locher, Robert Nickas, Matthew Slotover, Berta Sichel and Benjamin Weil.

=== Critical reception ===
Artforum published a review entitled "Aperto 93: The Better Biennale". The model of Aperto ’93 is often quoted by curators, and it was a source of inspiration for the 2003 Venice Biennale directed by Francesco Bonami, the first Moscow Biennale (directed by Viktor Misiano, Hans Ulrich Obrist, Daniel Birnbaum, Nicolas Bourriaud, Rosa Martinez, Iara Bubnova and Robert Storr, the second Johannesburg Biennale directed by Okwui Enwezor, and the first and second Gwangju Biennale (directed by Yongwoo Lee).

== Artists in Aperto '93 ==
- Laura Aguilar
- Pep Agut
- Kai Althoff
- Janine Antoni
- Filadelfo Anzalone
- Hany Armanious
- Matthew Barney
- Sadie Benning
- Biefer & Zgraggen
- Bigert & Bergström
- Henry Bond
- Christine Borland
- Marco Brandizzi
- Angela Bulloch
- Kathe Burkhart
- Giorgio Cattani
- Maurizio Cattelan
- Cercle Ramo Nash
- Dawn Clements
- Mat Collishaw
- Meg Cranston
- John Currin
- Mario Dellavedova
- Jessica Diamond
- Cheryl Donegan
- Milena Dopitová
- Lukas Duwenhögger
- Maria Eichhhorn
- Róza El-Hassan
- Marcelo Expósito
- Ocean Earth Construction and Development Corporation
- Sylvie Fleury
- Formento & Sossella
- Dominique Gonzalez-Foerster
- Félix Gonzáles-Torres
- Gotscho
- Renée Green
- Scott Grodesky
- Sigrid Hackenberg
- Haha
- Lothar Hempel
- José Antonio Hernández-Diez
- Damien Hirst
- Carsten Höller
- Martin Honert
- Richard House
- Fabrice Hybert
- Wendy Jacob
- Michael W. Joo
- Samuel Kane Kwei
- Josif Kiraly
- Dimitris Kozaris
- Elke Krystufek
- Carter Kustera
- Alix Lambert
- Sean Landers
- Zbigniew Libera
- Eva Marisaldi
- Daniel J. Martinez
- Paul McCarthy
- Lee Ming-Sheng
- Dan Mihaltianu
- Regina Möller
- Mondo / Mokoh
- Gianmarco Montesano
- Liliana Moro / Bernhard Rüdiger
- Kirsten Mosher
- Kohdai Nakahara
- New Madras Agency
- Bonnie Ntshalintshali
- Kristin Oppenheim
- Gabriel Orozco
- Anatoly Osmolovsky
- Laurie Palmer
- Angelos Papadimitriou
- Paper Tiger Television
- Philippe Parreno
- Simon Patterson
- Hirsch Perlman
- Dan Peterman
- Vong Phaophanit
- Steven Pippin
- Premiata Ditta s.a.s. (Vincenzo Chiarandà e Anna Stuart Tovini)
- Luca Quartana
- Charles Ray
- Rosângela Rennó
- Pipilotti Rist
- Julie Roberts
- Alexis Rockman
- Christopher Roth
- Nancy Rubins
- Doris Salcedo
- Sergio Sarra
- Eran Schaerf
- Nicolaus Schafhausen
- Julia Scher
- Rainald Schumacher
- Andres Serrano
- Wu Shanzhuan
- Torsten Slama
- Kiki Smith
- Nedko Solakov
- Ivano Sossella
- Georgina Starr
- Franz Stauffenberg
- Rudolf Stingel
- SubREAL
- Botala Tala
- Rikrit Tiravanija
- Maria Grazia Toderi
- TODT
- Rigoberto Torres
- Oliviero Toscani
- Octavian Trauttmansdorff
- Noboru Tsubaki
- Patrick Van Caeckenbergh
- Niek Van De Steeg
- Eugenia Vargas
- Rolf Walz
- Nari Ward
- Sue Williams
- Yukinori Yanagi
- Wang Youshen
- Peter Zimmermann
- Andrea Zittel

== Bibliography ==
- Giannattasio, Sandra (17 December 1992). "La Biennale di Bonito Oliva annuncia a Venezia le tendenze di fine secolo" (PDF). Avanti!. No. 296. p. 18. Archived from the original (PDF) on 15 January 2019.
- "Biennale di Venezia Aperto '93 Emergenze". Flash Art. Vol. 26, no. 175. May 1993. p. 69.
- Bonito Oliva, Achille; Kontova, Helena (1993). Aperto'93: Emergency/Emergenza: Flash Art International, exhibition catalogue. Milan: Giancarlo Politi Editore. ISBN 8878160539. OCLC 832241900. OPAC IT\ICCU\LO1\0323441.
- Bonito Oliva, Achille (1993). Punti cardinali dell'arte catalogue of the 45th Venice International Art Exhibition, Vol. I. Venice: Marsilio Editori s.p.a. ISBN 88-208-0378-X. OCLC 832241900. OPAC IT\ICCU\RAV\0225285.
- Di Matteo, Gabriele; Silvestro, Franco; vedovamazzei (1993). "Ad Aperto novecentonovantatre si scambiarono per se stessi/The name of player playing the part". E IL TOPO magazine. No. 4.
- Verzotti, Giorgio (October 1993). "Aperto '93 – The Better Biennale". Artforum. Vol. 32, no. 2. pp. 104–105.
- Ricci, Clarissa (2013). "La Biennale di Venezia 1993 – 2003: L’esposizione come piattaforma". Venice: Università Ca' Foscari Venezia.
- Kontova, Helena; Obrist, Hans Ulrich (November–December 2017). "The Better Biennale". Flash Art International. Vol. 50, no. 317.
