= Sergio Sarra =

Italian artist (born 1961)

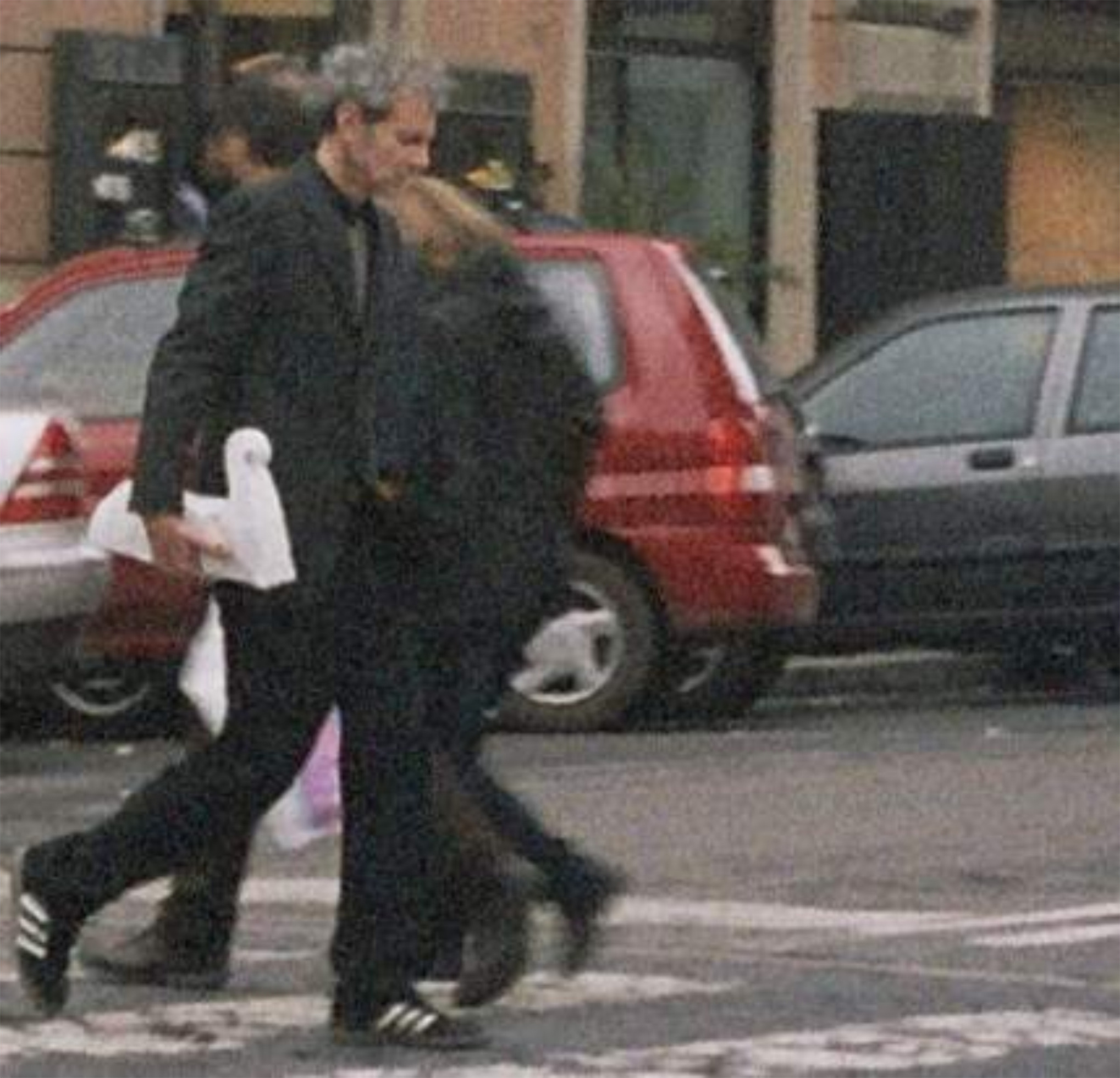
- Sergio Sarra, Rome 2010
- Born: 1961 (age 64–65); Pescara, Italy
- Education: Academy of Fine Arts in Bologna
- Known for: painting, sculpture, drawing
- Spouse: Elisabetta Ruscitti
- Website: www.sergiosarra.it

Sergio Sarra (Pescara 1961) is an Italian artist and former basketball player.

In 1985, at the age of 24, he retired from playing competitively in order to study at the School of Painting at the Academy of Fine Arts in Bologna, concluding in 1987. Sarra took part in the Biennial of Young Artists from Mediterranean Europe (Barcelona – 1987), Venice Biennale at the Corderie dell'Arsenale (1993) in Aperto '93, at the Italian Pavilion (2011) and in the Havana Biennial (2000). Sarra curated the group exhibition Conversione di Saulo at Palazzo Chigi Odescalchi (Rome – 2000) and exhibited at the Muzeul Naţional de Artă Contemporană (Bucharest – 2007) and the WAX Winkler Art Xperience (Budapest – 2007) in Altered States – Are you experienced?, group exhibition curated by Nicolas Bourriaud and Paolo Falcone, and at Baths of Diocletian (Rome – 2008) at Cose mai viste curated by Achille Bonito Oliva. In 2019, Sarra exhibited at 4th Festival del Paesaggio in Anacapri.

Other group exhibitions at: Palazzo Rondanini alla Rotonda (Rome – 1989), Palazzo della Permanente (Milan – 1991) and Espace Pierre Cardin (Paris – 1992), 34^{th} Spoleto Festival of 2Worlds (Fonti del Clitunno – 1991), Fondazione Orestiadi (Gibellina – 1992), Palazzo delle Esposizioni (Rome – 1992, 1995), Fondazione Volume! (Rome – 2000).

Sarra has held solo exhibitions at public and private institutions including the Faculty of Architecture of University of Palermo (1998), the Micromuseum for Contemporary Art and Culture (Palermo – 2004), Circolo Filologico Milanese (Milan – 2008), the Conservatory of Santa Cecilia (Rome – 2013), the Ewha Womans University (Seoul – 2016), the Benedictine Abbey of Propezzano (Morro d'Oro – 2018), Mattatoio Museo d'Arte Contemporanea (Rome - 2019).

From the beginning of his artistic career, Sarra worked almost exclusively with painting, drawing and sculpture. In 1997, the art critic and curator Lorenzo Benedetti wrote:

[...] In Sarra ci troviamo di fronte ad una intensa sinteticità dal punto di vista del processo formale a vantaggio di una maggiore concentrazione al dato concettuale… L'animale, i paesaggi e i volti vengono stilizzati fino al limite del riconoscibile [...]
([...] With Sarra we are faced with an intense conciseness from the perspective of the formal process in favour of a greater concentration on the conceptual factor… The animal, the landscapes and the faces are stylised to the limit of being recognisable [...])

— Lorenzo Benedetti, in "The Sacred of Fusi and the Sign of Sarra", May 1997

== Life and work ==
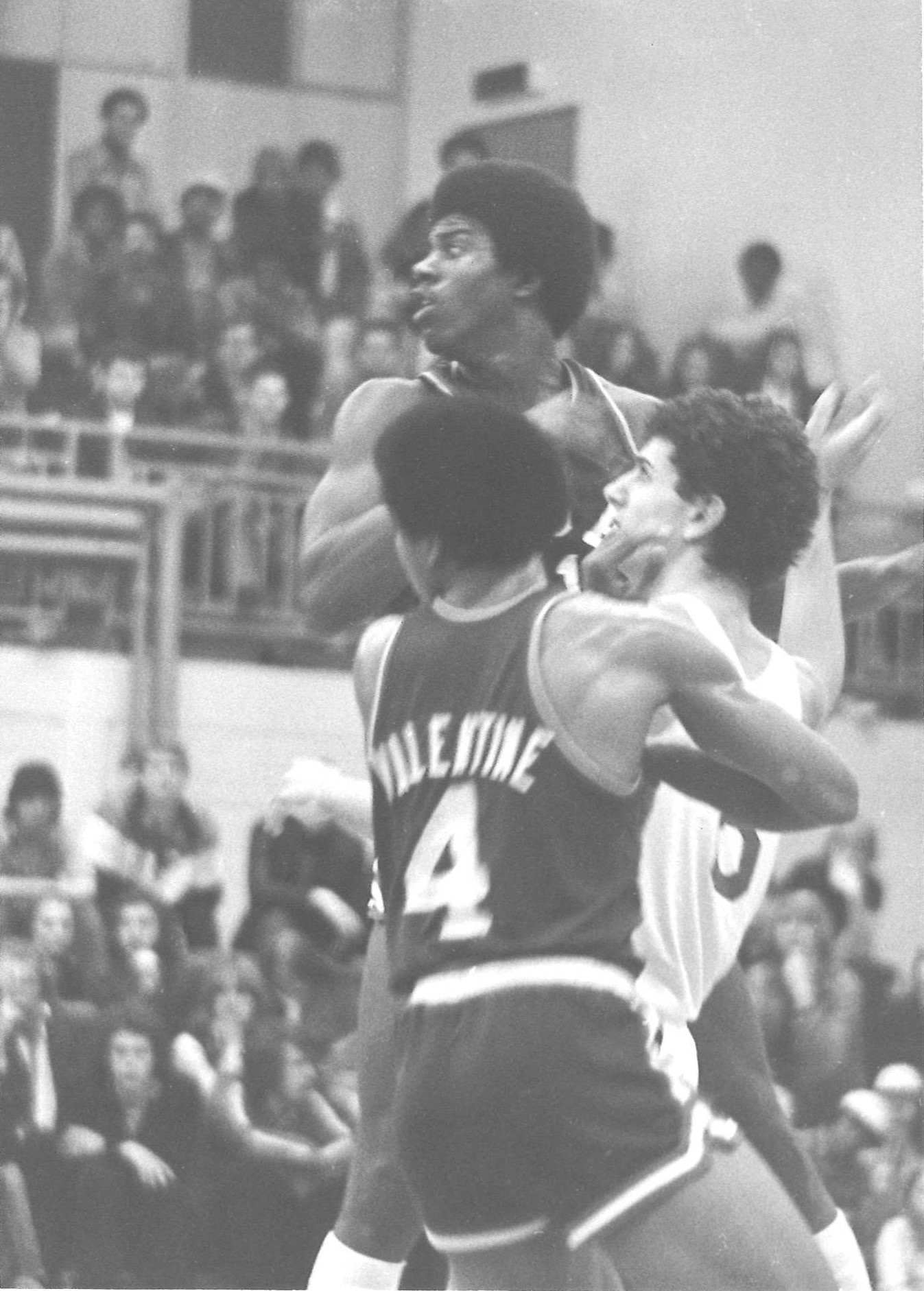
From top: Earvin 'Magic' Johnson, Sergio Sarra e Darnell Valentine, Italia – USA, AST Under-18 Basketball World Cup, Mannheim (FRG), 1977

He played for the national youth teams, making his debut at sixteen in the Italian Series A basketball championship with the Fortitudo Bologna team.

Upon completing his studies at the Accademia di Belle Arti di Bologna (1987), Sarra then moved to Rome where he held his first solo exhibition at the Galleria Alice in 1990, presenting an installation consisting of four painted sheets of glass and crossed by white light from industrial neon tubes. Such works – being glass – on which Sarra drew symbolic and enigmatic figures, went on to become a constant in his work. In this sense, two solo exhibitions – Trinacria dream (Porto – 2007) and un ambiente, sei vetri (Rome – 2013) – appear indicative. In occasion of the exhibition in Portugal, art critic Miguel Amado wrote:

[…] Referencing classicism and employing symbolism in creating his enigmatic vision of the world, Sarra calls attention to the iconic power of the handmade image in Western civilization.

— Miguel Amado, in "Sergio Sarra – MCO Arte Contemporânea", artforum.com, 2 April 2017

Over the next few years, he produced a series of paintings on emulsified canvas – Primitive – comprising zoomorphic figures that were almost always mirror images. The artist was invited to take part in the Aperto '93 Emergency/Emergenza - 45^{th} Venice Biennale, where he created an environment consisting of a long wooden platform in chipboard with three paintings on the walls featuring: Iguane, Paesaggio and Autoritratto. Clarity and essentiality become the dominant factors in his work.

In the paintings after 1997, the artist poses with his 'sign-drawing', being continuous and abstract, various elements – faces, zoomorphic groups, buildings with unknown geometries – that insist upon previous pictorial composition processes that are not entirely erased to reveal further combinatorial forms. In Une correspondance sur les fantômes avec Sergio Sarra between Sarra e Nicolas Bourriaud in May 2007, the French critic and theorist wrote:

[…] Vos travaux font penser à des palimpsestes, ces manuscrits que leur auteur trace sur un document existant, sans effacer la ou les couches d'écriture précédentes. […]
([…] Your works make one think of palimpsests, namely of those manuscripts that an author writes over an earlier text, without cancelling previous layers of writing. […])

— Nicolas Bourriaud, in "Une correspondance sur les fantômes avec Sergio Sarra", Sergio Sarra, catalogue, May 2007

In 2000, in Rome, his works were exhibited at the Fondazione Volume!. In the same year, Sarra curated at Palazzo Chigi Odescalchi the group exhibition Conversione di Saulo that was developed around the painting of the same name, painted in 1600 by Caravaggio. Also in 2000, Sarra married Elisabetta Ruscitti in Amalfi, with whom he lived for a short time in Naples. In 2001, their son Gerolamo Papik Merlino was born. It was in Naples that he produced Table Sculpture (table projection on 12 points), a table/sculpture with a huge red Komodo dragon hooked underneath.

Over the same period, he produced the performance Life drawing no. 2, representing the connection between the manual creation and collective fruition in which Sarra coerces the public's perceptive nature, using a strobe light to produce a decisive intermittence between darkness and light. This is the same direction in which Sarra heads when painting 'from real life' inside the WAX Kultúrgyár in Budapest and the Muzeul Naţional de Artă Contemporană in Bucharest for the exhibition Altered States – Are you Experienced? (2006–2007). Between 2006 and 2009, Sarra worked on a series of paintings entitled Psichedelyc garden, in which he reiterates the same design, altering the chromatic impact each time.

In 2011, Sarra published perché la spiaggia si assottiglia dopo le Nàiadi, a book in which he collates a series of drawings and writings focused on the city of Pescara. In 2012, he designed Handrail for Cubist Films, inspired by Fernand Léger's 1924 film Ballet Mécanique, and the diptych Involuntary Commitment, which was exhibited at Galleria Cesare Manzo in Rome and at Fuori Uso 2012 in Pescara.

[…] Anche in quest'ultima occasione Sarra elabora un percorso in cui l'apparente 'ripetizione' dell'opera viene simultaneamente smentita. Il tentativo di dipingere due quadri uguali sposta l'attenzione del pubblico sull'abilità pittorica, la copia, l'indifferenza. Lo sforzo esercitato diventa un 'impegno controvoglia'. […]
([…] Also on this occasion, Sarra expounds a path along which the apparent 'repetition' of the work is simultaneously denied. The attempt to paint two equal paintings shifts the public's attention to the pictorial ability, to copying, to indifference. The effort exerted becomes an 'involuntary commitment'. […])

— Simone Ciglia, in "The indifferents" (press release), exhibart.com, March 2010

In June 2016, Sarra was invited to exhibit at the Ewha Womans University in Seoul, where he presented a series of drawings and paintings entitled iceberg rosaspina, accompanied by a short text written by the artist:

I am painting icebergs, a series of icebergs. Each of them is a still life drawing, even though it may look like an automatisme. Icebergs are wandering and solitary shapes subject to imperceptible transformation, and they incorporate other shapes and remote images. The submerged part of these ice mountains is almost completely invisible and its balance and flotation capacity is strictly connected to the emerging part. When this ration ceases to exist, icebergs can overturn with deafening sounds, showing the part which has been hidden for millennia.

— Sergio Sarra, in "Icebergs" (press release), 24 May 2016

Traces of the theoretical processes underlying his works can be found in the short film My Painting Technique (2009, 2015).

== Critical review ==
Since the early Nineties, Sergio Sarra has been exploring the iconic nature of painting, (and of sculptural installations and performances) to approach things through an abstract comprehension, while also conjuring up ancestral figures: "it would be important for me to be able to make a really archaic drawing, that can be recognized only by one's consciousness, and has never been seen in real life".
For Sarra, the manual aspect of drawing is akin to a sort of imponderable writing, executed "from life" but detached from any interest in spatial composition; "the color must only be meaningful, not descriptive", and "a painting is finished when it resists the company of the other work in the studio."
Each piece is generated by an observing consciousness, that moves within autobiographical spaces and cultural affiliations, interrelating signs in redundant sequences: architectural antinomies, dualities, border zones, specious repetitions; transparent grids and aporias.
His home studio project is a clear form that interprets one of the artist's favorite landscapes: a protected space, personal and familiar, that fosters suggestions and ideas, where Sergio Sarra has organized his own painting possibilities.

— Rossella Caruso, in "Sergio Sarra Critical Review", sergiosarra.it, July 2018

== Main readings ==
- Pratesi, Ludovico (1990). "The Power of Fate". In Pratesi, Ludovico (ed.). Sergio Sarra, exhibition catalogue. Rome: Galleria Alice arte contemporanea. OCLC 1004344143. OPAC IT\ICCU\IEI\0285597.
- Bonito Oliva, Achille (1990). "L'arte fino al 2000 di Achille Bonito Oliva". In Argan, Giulio Carlo (ed.). L'Arte Moderna di Giulio Carlo Argan, volume attached to Corriere della Sera of 28 November 1990, Vol. 11. Milan: RCS Editoriale Quotidiani SpA. Bonito Oliva, Achille (1991). "L'arte fino al 2000 di Achille Bonito Oliva". In Argan, Giulio Carlo (ed.). L'Arte moderna / Giulio Carlo Argan. L'arte fino al 2000 / Achille Bonito Oliva. Florence: Sansoni Editore. ISBN 88-3831-34-4-X. OCLC 797910250. OPAC IT\ICCU\CFI\0168979.
- Bonito Oliva, Achille (1991). "Così: lo stato dell'arte (e anche della critica)". In Bonito Oliva, Achille (ed.). Così – Lo stato dell'arte. Rome: Leonardo – De Luca Editori. ISBN 88-7813-347-7. OCLC 484125510. OPAC IT\ICCU\LO1\0052213.
- Bonito Oliva, Achille (1992). "Immagini allo zoo". In Bonito Oliva, Achille (ed.). Propaganda Arte. Rome: Carte Segrete Editore. ISBN 978-8885203853. OCLC 193358740.
- D'Avossa Antonio (1993). "Vedute sul Mondo Reale". In Achille Bonito Oliva (curated by), "Punti cardinali dell'arte", catalog of the 45th International Exhibition of Art in Venice, Vol. I, Venice, Marsilio Editori S.P.A., 1993, ISBN 88-208-0378-X, OCLC, OPAC IT\ICCU\RAV\0225285.
- D'Avossa, Antonio (1993). "La risposta, amico mio, sta soffiando nel vento – Lettera aperta a Pep Agut, Bigert & Bergström, Marco Brandizzi, Giorgio Cattani, Maria Eichhorn, Marcelo Expósito, Carsten Höller, Kirsten Mosher, Luca Quartana, Sergio Sarra e SubREAL". In Bonito Oliva, Achille; Kontova, Helena; Daney, Serge; et al. (eds.). Aperto '93: Emergency/Emergenza: Flash Art International, exhibition catalogue. Milan: Giancarlo Politi Editore. ISBN 8878160539. OCLC 832241900. OPAC IT\ICCU\LO1\0323441.
- Caruso, Rossella; et al. (1993). "ateleta". In Bonito Oliva, Achille; Kontova, Helena; Daney, Serge (eds.). Aperto '93: Emergency/Emergenza: Flash Art International, exhibition catalogue. Milan: Giancarlo Politi Editore. ISBN 8878160539. OCLC. OPAC IT\ICCU\LO1\0323441.
- Di Pietrantonio, Giacinto (1997). "Oblique Archetypes". Sergio Sarra, exhibition catalogue. Pescara: Edizione Galleria Cesare Manzo. OCLC 1004344143. OPAC IT\ICCU\TO0\1048791.
- Benedetti, Lorenzo (1997). "The Sacred of Fusi and the Sign of Sarra". Critique of the exhibition. In Literature, sergiosarra.it. Zerynthia Associazione per l'Arte Contemporanea.
- Sarra, Sergio (2000). "Conversione di Saulo", exhibition catalogue. Pescara: Edizioni Arte Nova. OCLC. OPAC IT\ICCU\TO0\0918995.
- Macrì, Teresa (2003). "Anomalous Hotel". In Macrì, Teresa (ed.). Anomalie, exhibition catalogue. Pescara: Edizioni Arte Nova. OPAC IT\ICCU\TO0\1282378.
- Curi, Umberto (2007). "Testo dedicato all'opera "Ipotesi di Biblioteca di Chimica dell'Università di Padova (LSD)" di Sergio Sarra". Special Project. In Bourriaud, Nicolas; Falcone, Paolo. Altered States – Are you experienced?, exhibition catalogue. Pescara: Edizioni Arte Nova. OCLC. OPAC IT\ICCU\URB\0638550.
- Amado, Miguel (2 April 2007). "Sergio Sarra – MCO Arte Contemporânea". artforum.com.
- Bourriaud, Nicolas (2007). "A correspondence on ghosts with Sergio Sarra". In Sergio Sarra, catalogue. Rome: Galleria Cesare Manzo. OCLC 880870197. OPAC IT\ICCU\UBO\3622112.
- Marsala, Helga (2008). "Noisy Writings. Sergio Sarra's Aesthetics of Void". In Sergio Sarra : pearl fishermen, exhibition catalogue. Milan: Circolo Filologico Milanese. OCLC. OPAC IT\ICCU\RMS\2754024.
- Piccoli, Cloe (2011). "Town drawings". In Sergio Sarra, perché la spiaggia si assottiglia dopo le Nàiadi. Silvi (Teramo): Edizione Sarra Varano. ISBN 978-88-906766-0-4. OCLC. OPAC IT\ICCU\TER\0036016.
- Curi, Umberto, La Pescara di Sergio Sarra, 13 December 2011.
- Cippitelli, Lucrezia (13 December 2012). "Sergio Sarra". neromagazine.it.
- Sarra, Sergio (2016). "Icebergs". In Sergio Sarra : excluding the things I chose to do, exhibition catalogue. Rome: Edizioni di Comunità. ISBN 978-8832005219. OCLC 1124656885. OPAC IT\ICCU\BVE\0813805.
- Cherubini, Laura (2018). "INFINITY. Bruna Esposito & Sergio Sarra in Recanati". In Bruna Esposito Sergio Sarra, exhibition catalogue. Recanati (Macerata): Idill'Io arte contemporanea. OCLC. OPAC IT\ICCU\BVE\0803903.
- Caruso, Rossella (July 2018). "Sergio Sarra Critical Review". sergiosarra.it.
- D'Orazio, Giorgio (2018). "I Say to You". In Sarra, Sergio (ed.). Dico a te, exhibition catalogue. Morro d'Oro (Teramo): Abbey of Propezzano. OCLC 1105931902.1103488942. OPAC IT\ICCU\BVE\0803753.
- Pietroiusti, Cesare Maria (2019). untitled. In Sergio Sarra : excluding the things I chose to do, exhibition catalogue. Rome: Edizioni di Comunità. ISBN 978-8832005219. OCLC 1124656885. OPAC IT\ICCU\BVE\0813805.
- Cherubini, Laura (2019). "Sergio Sarra. At the drawing board". In Sergio Sarra : excluding the things I chose to do, exhibition catalogue. Rome: Edizioni di Comunità. ISBN 978-8832005219. OCLC, OPAC IT\ICCU\BVE\0813805.
- Benassi, Giuliana (2019). "The art-life study". In Camerlengo, Simone (ed.). OPENWORK : a focus on painting, exhibition catalogue.
- Sarra, Sergio (2020). Sergio Sarra twenty six figures painted on board. Bologna: Fondazione del Monte di Bologna e Ravenna, 2020, ISBN 979-12-200-7311-0, OPAC IT\ICCU\RMS\2968431.
- Bruni, Lorenzo. "Things Seen", Critique of the exhibition, 2021.
- Legrenzi, Susanna, "L'artista Sergio Sarra: «Ho pensato lo studio come un'installazione. Più che in armonia, in contrasto con il paesaggio»". In Living, Vol. 10, pp. 200-209, volume attached to Corriere della Sera of 6 October 2021, Vol. 237.
