= Prague Biennale =

Art exhibition in Prague, Czech Republic

- Status: Inactive
- Genre: Contemporary art
- Locations: Prague, Czech Republic
- Years active: 2003–2013
- Founder: Helena Kontová; Giancarlo Politi
- Organizer: Nadace Prague Biennale

The Prague Biennale is an international art exhibition in Prague, Czech Republic, held in alternate (odd-numbered) years. It was founded in 2003 by Helena Kontova and Giancarlo Politi. It is supported by the Czech Minister of Culture and the City of Prague. The New York Times said of it in 2009: "Now in its fourth iteration, the biennial has a reputation for working on the cheap (the lighting is minimal to nonexistent, meaning viewings have to end by sundown) and for offering the first appearance of emerging artists from Central and Eastern Europe."

The Prague Biennale is a partner organisation of the Biennial Foundation.

== Biennales ==
=== 1. 2003 ===
The first Prague Biennale had the title "Peripheries become the center" and took place from 26 June to 24 August at the National Gallery in Prague's Veletrzni Palac.

Participants

Lazarus Effect. curated by Luca Beatrice, Lauri Firstenberg and Helena Kontova

Superreal. Curated by Lauri Firstenberg

Mission Possible. Curated by Michal Kolecek

When Periphery turns center and center turns periphery. Curated by Jens Hoffmann

Beautiful banners. Representation/Democracy/Partecipation. Curated by Marco Scotini

Italy: Out of Order. Curated by Luca Beatrice and Giancarlo Politi (I)

Illusion of security. Curated by Lino Baldini and Gyonata Bonvicini (I)

Differentia specifica. Curated by Judit Angel

alone / together. Curated by Jacob Fabricius

(Dis)locations. Curated by Julieta Gonzalez

Global Suburbia. Curated by Dorothée Kirch

Seduced (by speeds and movements): Towards active agencies of fictions and realities in Polish art. Curated by Adam Budak

Collecting, Channeling. Curated by Sofia Hernandez

Space and Subjectivity. Curated by Lauri Firstenberg

Overcoming alienation. Emerging artists from Russia. Curated by Ekaterina Lazareva

Contemporary identities. Curated by Charlotte Mailler

No title. Curated by Gregor Muir

Leaving Glasvegas. Scottish Art scene after the ’90. Curated by Neil Mulholland

Virtual Perception. Curated by Laurence Dreyfus

IMPROVisual. curated by Lavinia Garulli

The art of Survival. Curated by B+B (Sarah Carrington and Sophie Hope)

China Art Today. Curated by Francesca Jordan & Primo Marella

Disturbance (Interference). Curated by Helena Kontova

Come with me. Curated by Gea

Aión: an eventual architecture. Curated by Andrea Di Stefano

Deste Foundation (Xenia Kalpaktsoglou, Dakis Joannou, Greece)

Special Guest Curator: Francesco Vezzoli (artist, Italy)

Special Projects:

Brand Art

Special Homage to Czech women artists

Pass-it-on. Curated by Raimundas Malasauskas (Lithuania)

Soya Sauce and Ketchup Fight

=== 2. 2005 ===
The second biennale took place from 26 May to 15 September at the Karlin Hall.

=== 3. 2007 ===
The third biennale took place from 24 May to 16 September at the Karlin Hall.

=== 4. 2009 ===
The fourth biennale took place from 14 May to 26 July at the Karlin Hall and was one of the events of the Czech Presidency of the European Union.

=== 5. 2011 ===
The fifth biennale took place from 19 May to 11 September at the new venue of Microna.

=== 6. 2013 ===
The 6th Prague Biennale opened at the Žižkov freight railway station in Prague on 6 June.

=== Prague Biennale Photo ===
In parallel, the foundation launched a photography biennial: Prague Biennale Photo 1 (2009) and Prague Biennale Photo 2 (2011).

== See also ==
- Prague Quadrennial
