= Solar Egg =

Type of sauna

General information
- Status: Completed
- Type: Sauna
- Location: Luossabacken
- Town or city: Kiruna
- Country: Sweden
- Opened: April 2017
- Height: 5 m (16.4 ft)

Design and construction
- Architect(s): Bigert & Bergström
- Other designers: Lars Hässler

Renovating team
- Renovating firm: Riksbyggen

Website
- bigertbergstrom.com/works/solar-egg

Solar Egg is an egg-shaped sauna created by the artist duo Bigert & Bergström for Riksbyggen. The sauna sits perched in Luossabacken in Kiruna. The egg consists of a pine wood interior and a highly reflected gold steel panels. Its 4 m (13 ft) wide interior can fit up to eight people. while the inside still functions as a normal sauna with a wood-heated heart-shaped stove to keep the room around 80 °C (176 °F). Illumination comes in the form of LED lightning, which is powered by its sets of batteries.

Beyond its function as a sauna, Solar Egg is essentially a public sculpture developed in collaboration with artist duo Bigert & Bergström. The egg was temporarily moved to the Swedish Institute in central Paris, to draw attention to the Swedish design and visitors were able to experience the sauna first-hand. Solar Egg was recognized with Red Dot awards and German Design Awards as well as being nominated in the London International Awards and the Swedish design awards.

The egg shape seeks to symbolize rebirth and new opportunities at the start of Kiruna's urban transformation, a project that involves the relocation of the entire cities districts in response to ground subsidence caused by decades of iron ore minings.

== Construction ==
In Kiruna, Sweden, the entire community is being forced to move due to ground complications caused by a nearby ore mine. The Swedish artist duo Bigert & Bergström was commissioned by Riksbyggen to design commemorative social sculpture for the town after the residents voiced fears of losing community spirit after their relocation. The idea appears to be working, as travel groups are now offering free visits to the Solar Egg.
