= Paul Devautour =

French artist

Paul Devautour is a French artist born in 1958 who lives and works in Shanghai.

== Life and career ==
In collaboration with Yoon Ja Choi he created in 1985 the Collection Yoon Ja & Paul Devautour. They conceived works and exhibitions until 2004 under the names of Buchal et Clavel, Cercle Ramo Nash, Gladys Clover, J. Duplo, Manuel Ismora, Art Keller, Claude Lantier, Alexandre Lenoir, Martin Tupper and David Vincent. Some of their collected pieces are kept at the MAMCO in Geneva. Others are part of the Frac Poitou-Charentes collection (registered under the pseudonym Martin Tupper), the Villeurbanne Institut d'Art Contemporain collection, the Centre national des arts plastiques collection.

From 2004 to 2008, Paul Devautour held the position of dean of the École Nationale Supérieure d’Art de Bourges.

Since 2008 he is the director of XiYiTang in Shanghai, an exchange platform for art school students and a residency program for young artists.

He created with Xia Yilan DeYi Studio. Their manifesto was published in 2015 in Art Press.

He opened in 2011 in a Shanghai market an independent art space named Bazaar Compatible Program.

== Selected exhibitions ==
- Mobiles d'emprunt, Paris, Sylvana Lorenz Gallery (1989)
- Objectif Documenta, Kiel, Sfeir-Semler Gallery (1991)
- Générique vers une solidarité générationnelle, Meymac, CAC (1992)
- Aperto '93, Venice Biennale (1993)
- 21st National and International Studio Artists Exhibition, New York, MoMA PS1 (1997)
- Martin Tupper, Angoulême, Frac Poitou-Charentes, (2006)
- DeYi Studio Shanghai Paul Devautour, œuvres tardives, Quimper, Le Quartier (2014)
