= Austin Lee =

American artist

Austin Lee (born 1983) is an American artist based in New York. Lee's airbrush paintings often combine digital technologies with traditional media. He also works in sculpture and video.

== Early life and education ==
Lee was born in Las Vegas, Nevada, and raised in Philadelphia. He received an MFA in painting from Yale School of Art in 2013 and a BFA in painting from Tyler School of Art in 2006.

While a student at the Tyler School of Art in Philadelphia, Lee's studio doubled as a gallery space where he organized group and solo exhibitions to promote his artistic community. After attending Yale for his MFA, Lee moved to New York in 2013.

== Work ==
Lee once defined himself "a computer nerd as well as an artist." The use of digital platforms and technologies offer him the opportunity to work against the tradition of painting: Lee transitioned from using Adobe Photoshop in his early work to adopting the Oculus Rift's virtual-reality program Medium as an imaginary studio. He then transfers the V.R. drawings to the canvas through the use of the airbrush and the paintbrush. As a result of this technique, the final paintings are very luminous and evoke both the light of a computer screen and the intense coloration of color field painting. Lee investigates how different types of human gestures and touch – both digitally rendered and organic – can affect viewers.

The artist sources his subjects from his daily life: people who attract his attention on the subway or the internet, scenes of ordinary activities, animals, and flowers. Many of Lee's works evoke the emojis that have become part of everyday conversation. However, by confronting the viewer with familiar images, his works explore the dichotomy of contemporary phenomena, such as social media, that carry both positive and negative effects.

Further exploiting the possibilities offered by the world of V.R., Lee has also created a series of sculptures that give form to his digital drawings with the use of a 3D printer. While at first glance, the subjects of these sculptures appear joyful and soothing, the distortions of forms attribute a disturbing note to their flashy cheerfulness.

Lee's work entertains a dialogue with the work of artists from older generations. While the effortlessness of Alex Katz's paintings has certainly influenced him, the use of new technology in David Hockney's iPad Drawings and Cindy Sherman's Instagram self-portraits likewise resonates in Lee's works.

Art critic Will Heinrich at The New York Times affirmed, “Austin Lee's analog portraits of cyberspace are strangely fascinating." Jeffrey Deitch has compared Lee's practice to Pop Art, “As Andy Warhol used photo silkscreens to connect painting with the image-making technologies of the 1960s, Lee fuses digital techniques with traditional painting and sculptural processes to create totally contemporary works of art."

== Exhibitions ==
=== Solo exhibitions ===
- Human Nature, M WOODS Museum, Beijing, 2022
- American Psyche, Austin Lee & Mark Thomas Gibson, Carl Kostyál, Stockholm, 2021
- Paradise, Carl Kostyál in collaboration with KALEIDOSCOPE, Spazio Maiocchi, Milan, Italy, 2019
- Feels Good, Jeffrey Deitch, New York City, 2019
- Constant Joy, Mosaic Art Foundation, Istanbul, 2019
- Tomato Can, Peres Projects, Berlin, 2018
- Serious Works, Kaikai Kiki, Tokyo, 2017
- Light Paintings, BANK, Shanghai, 2016
- Anxiety, New Galerie, Paris, 2016
- Nothing Personal, Postmasters Gallery, New York, 2015
- NO FAIR, Isbrytaren, Carl Kostyál, Stockholm, 2015
- Me Art, Kaleidoscope, Milan, 2015
- Mixed Feelings, Carl Kostyál, London, 2014
- OK OK OK OK OK OK OK OK OK OK OK OK OK OK OK, Postmasters Gallery, New York, 2014

=== Selected group exhibitions ===
- Punch, Curated by Nina Chanel Abney, Jeffrey Deitch, Los Angeles, 2019
- Punch, Curated by Nina Chanel Abney, Jeffrey Deitch, New York, 2018
- Summer Show, Carl Kostyál, Stockholm, 2017
- The Second Self, Peres Projects, Berlin, 2017
- For Pete’s Sake, Carl Kostyál, Stockholm, 2016
- Full of Peril and Weirdness: Painting as a Universalism, M Woods, Beijing, 2015
