= Jeffrey Deitch =

American art dealer and curator (born 1952)

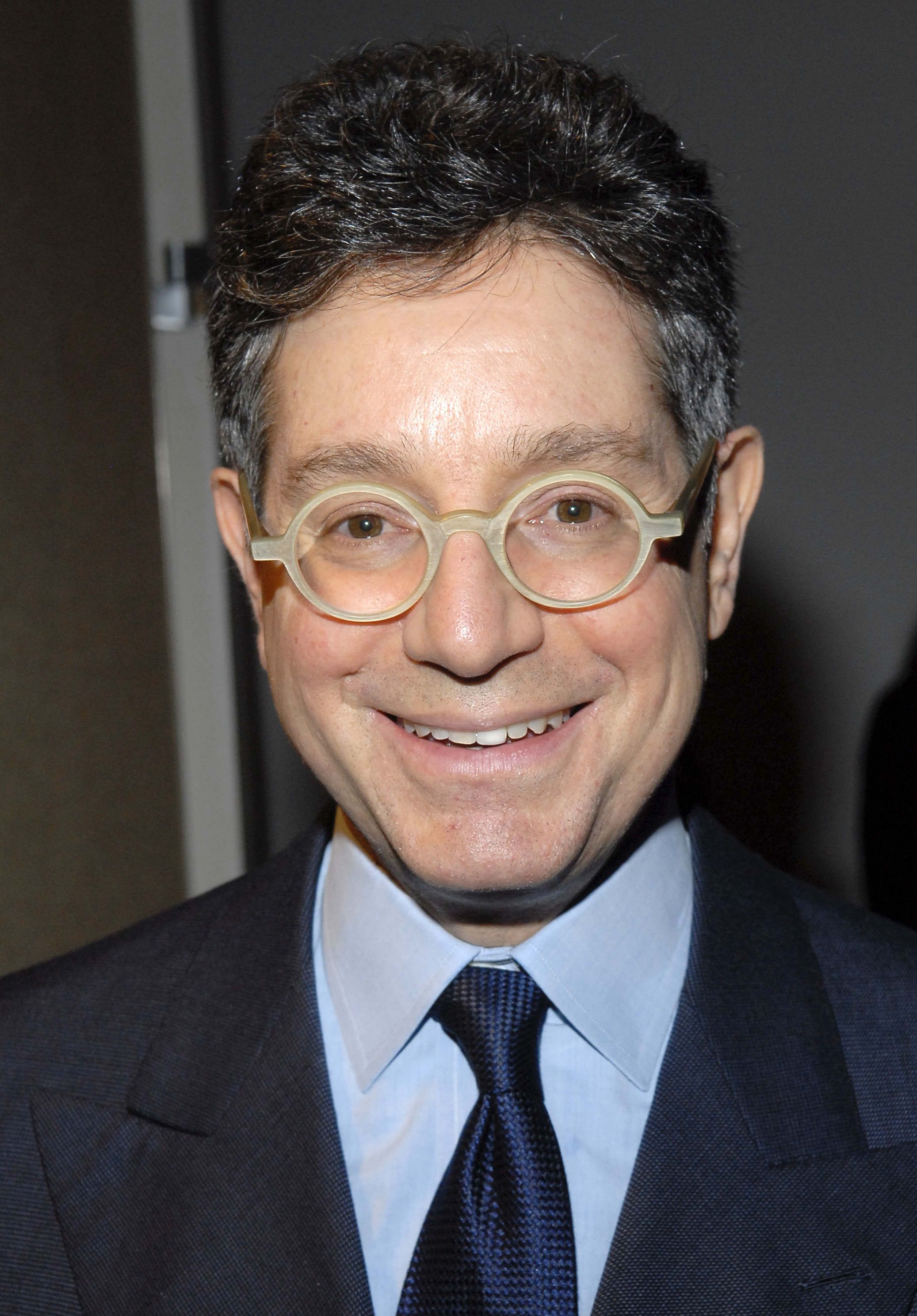
- Deitch in 2007
- Born: July 9, 1952 (age 74); Hartford, Connecticut, US
- Education: Wesleyan University (1974); Harvard Business School (1978)
- Occupations: art dealer, curator
- Years active: 1972–present
- Website: deitch.com

Jeffrey Deitch (pronounced DIE-tch; born July 9, 1952) is an American art dealer and curator. He is best known for his gallery Deitch Projects (1996–2010) and curating groundbreaking exhibitions such as Lives (1975) and Post Human (1992), the latter of which has been credited with introducing the concept of "posthumanism" to popular culture. In 2010, ArtReview named him as the twelfth most influential person in the international art world.

Deitch has been closely associated with artists such as Andy Warhol, Jean-Michel Basquiat, and Jeff Koons. From 2010 to 2013, he served as director of the Museum of Contemporary Art, Los Angeles (MOCA). He currently owns and directs Jeffrey Deitch Gallery, an art gallery with locations in New York and Los Angeles.

== Early life and education ==
Deitch was born on July 9, 1952, and grew up in Hartford, Connecticut, where his father ran a heating oil and coal company and his mother was an economist. Deitch has described his family as Ashkenazi Jewish, with ancestors who emigrated from Eastern Europe to the United States. His paternal grandparents established Kasden Fuel Company in Hartford, Connecticut, as part of a family network of coal businesses. Deitch worked in the family business during his teenage years, assisting with heating and air conditioning installations.

His mother attended Smith College and worked as an economist at the Federal Reserve Bank of New York. After returning to graduate school, she became a partner at Futures Group, a consulting firm specializing in economic and demographic forecasting. Deitch has credited his family's intellectual interests and experience in business with influencing his upbringing. He grew up in a household that displayed artworks by local Hartford artists. At approximately ten years old, he purchased a Fernad Léger print at an art exhibition held by his family's synagogue. As a child, he expressed an interest in taking art lessons, although his mother initially encouraged him to study music, leading him to take the piano and trumpet lessons.

He attended public high school in West Hartford, Connecticut, from 1967 to 1970. He was an exchange student in Paris in 1968, and in Japan in 1969. He attended Wesleyan University, and in the fall of 1973, while studying art history, he visited the New York townhouse of collectors Barbara and John Jakobson during a class trip. He later described viewing the Jakobsons' collection, including a painting by Frank Stella, as a formative experience that helped inspire his decision to become an art dealer. He went on to graduate from Wesleyan University in 1974 and reconnected with Barbara Jakobson while working at John Weber Gallery the same year, beginning a friendship that he said lasted 50 years. Deitch received an MBA from Harvard Business School in 1978.

== Personal life ==
From the mid-1980s until 1991, Deitch lived with Italian artist Laura Grisi, whom he met through art dealer Leo Castelli. A July 2010 Vanity Fair profile identified Paige Powell, a former advertising director of Interview magazine and associate of Andy Warhol, as Deitch's girlfriend of approximately two years. A January 2014 profile in New York Magazine reported that Deitch had never married as of that date.

== Career ==
Deitch opened his first gallery as a college student in 1972 at the Curtis Inn, a rented hotel parlor in Lenox, Massachusetts, and sold out the first week. Fascinated by the work of Andy Warhol and other contemporary artists, he later moved to New York and worked as a receptionist at John Weber Gallery in SoHo. While working in downtown Manhattan in the 1970s, he became involved in the city's emerging music and art scenes, regularly attending performances by bands including the Ramones, Suicide, and Television at CBGB and Max's Kansas City.

In 1975, he organized Lives, his first major curatorial exhibition, in a vacant office building in Tribeca. The exhibition explored artists who incorporated their personal lives into their artistic practices, a theme that Deitch continued to examine in later curatorial projects.

From 1979 to 1988, Deitch helped develop and co-manage the art advisory and art finance department at Citibank. In this capacity, he lent money to major art collectors and facilitated loans to small galleries like Gracie Mansion for its 1984 renovation. Having become a regular at Warhol’s Factory, Deitch also introduced Warhol to a number of wealthy clients to draw their portraits. In 2022, he appeared in the documentary series The Andy Warhol Diaries to discuss their friendship. Deitch was also a friend of and art dealer for Jean-Michel Basquiat. He was the first dealer to buy a work by the artist and the first person to write about his work in print. He later delivered the eulogy at Basquiat's funeral and served on the artwork authentication committee for the artist's estate.

In 1985, Deitch introduced Greek businessman and art collector Dakis Joannou to Jeff Koons's Equilibrium exhibition at International With Monument in New York. Joannou purchased Koons's One Ball Total Equilibrium Tank, which became an early work in his extensive contemporary art collection.

Deitch later described the art- market downturn of the early 1990s as an opportunity to acquire significant artworks at reduced prices. In a 2021 interview, he stated that purchases made during this downturn remained part of his collection and had also enabled him to invest in property in Manhattan's SoHo neighborhood.

From 1988 to 1996, Deitch was a successful private dealer and art adviser to a number of collectors, including Jose Mugrabi. As advisor to Goldman Sachs for the public art in its 200 West Street New York headquarters in 2006, Deitch helped to realize Julie Mehretu's 80-foot-long work "Mural", described by one critic as "one of the largest and most successful public art works in recent times".

In 1989, he bid US$10.5 million and paid $11.55 million for Jackson Pollock's silvery No. 8, 1950, then a record at auction for a work by the artist and the second-highest price at auction for a work by any contemporary artist. In 2006, he bought Bridget Riley's Untitled (Diagonal Curve) (1966), at Sotheby's for $2.1 million, nearly three times its $730,000 high estimate and also a record for the artist.

Over his career, Deitch has taken on a unique role, merging his curatorial profile with the business side of art.

=== Curatorial projects ===
Since 1975, Deitch has curated exhibitions internationally. Among his most celebrated projects are Lives (1975), Born in Boston (1979), New Portrait (1984) at Moma PS1, and Form Follows Fiction (2001) at Castello di Rivoli, Turin.

Between 1988 and 2008, Deitch curated numerous shows at Deste Foundation, Athens, including:

- Cultural Geometry (1988)
- Psychological Abstraction (1989)
- Artificial Nature (1990)
- Post Human (1992)
- Everything that’s Interesting is New (1996)
- Fractured Figure (2007-2008)

In addition to Deste, Post Human was presented at five venues, including the Castello di Rivoli (Turin), Deichtorhallen (Hamburg), and The Israel Museum (Jerusalem). Philosopher Rosi Braidotti and others credit the show with introducing the term "posthuman" into the popular consciousness.

In 1995, he wrote the strategic plan for the Mori Art Museum in Tokyo. His other curatorial projects have included the Venice Biennale's Aperto (1993), City as Studio (K11 Art Foundation, Hong Kong, 2023), and Confluence (Nita Mukesh Ambani Cultural Centre, Mumbai, 2023), collaborating with poet Ranjit Hoskote on the latter.

Deitch is known as an advocate for street art and has headed several influential public art projects with street artists. He initiated Wynwood Walls with Tony Goldman in Miami in 2009 and Coney Art Walls on Coney Island in New York in 2015.

==== Post Human and views on identity ====
The 1992 exhibition Post Human examined representations of the human body in mass media, including the influence of cosmetic surgery, genetic engineering, and idealized physical appearance on contemporary identity. Among the works exhibited at Castello di Rivoli were Kiki Smith's Tale (1992) and Paul McCarthy's The Garden (1991-1992). Smith's Tale depicts a nude female figure on her hands and knees with a long simulated trail of excrement extending from her body. The Castello di Rivoli characterized the exhibition's anthropomorphic sculptures as deliberately provocative and noted that several participating artists' works made explicit references to pornography.

In his 1992 catalogue essay for Post Human, Deitch examined how advances in biotechnology, computer science, cosmetic surgery, and communications technology might transform human identify and conventional definitions of the human body. He contrasted traditional concepts of identity, shaped by family history and psychological development, with an emerging understanding of the self as something individuals could actively construct and reinvent. Deitch attributed part of this transformation to the cultural changes associated with the late 1960s counterculture, including feminism, sexual liberation, multiculturalism, and challenges to traditional political and social authority. Discussing the influence of celebrity culture and mass media on individual identity, he wrote, "The world has become a mirror." Deitch speculated that genetic engineering might eventually allow humans to direct their own biological evolution rather than remain dependent on natural selection. Referring to the possibility of genetically modified future generations, he predicted that "Our children's generation could very well be the last generation of 'pure' humans." He anticipated that genetic modification, including attempts to select characteristics before birth, could produce profound ethical and political disputes concerning reproductive choices, bodily autonomy, and the limits of human intervention in biological life. He also envisioned technologies such as implanted computer chips that could expand human knowledge and cognitive abilities. He argued that electronic communications and emerging computer networks were changing perceptions of time and geographic distance, while an increasingly image focused media environment could alter established patterns of rational though. Regarding human relationships, he speculated that computer-mediated intimacy and immersive virtual sexual experiences could increasingly substitute for physical interaction. He connected these emerging social and technological developments to the work of contemporary artists including Robert Gober, Charles Ray, Paul McCarthy, and Kiki Smith, whose representations of fragmented, artificial, mechanized, or vulnerable bodies challenged conventional portrayals of the human figure. Interpreting aspects of their work as warnings about the potential psychological consequences of technological transformation, including alienation, compulsive behavior, and emotional distress. Toward the end of the essay, he questioned whether biotechnology would increase individual freedom or instead create new forms of social conformity and political control. He considered the possibility that governments might use genetic technologies for economic and military advantage, potentially deepening inequalities between technology advanced and poorer nations. Concluding that humanity would require a "new moral vision" to address the implications of technological modification, Deitch suggested that artists could play an increasingly important role in shaping society's understanding of future human life.

=== Art writing ===
In 1980, he became a regular columnist of Flash Art and the first U.S. editor of Flash Art International. His writings have appeared in numerous international magazines, including Art in America, Artforum, Garage, Interview magazine, Kaleidoscope, Paper magazine, and Purple magazine.

=== Deitch Projects (1996–2010) ===
In 1996, Deitch opened Deitch Projects in SoHo in New York City. He stated in a later interview that he was inspired by the example of Warhol's Factory to try to "create space for another generation of misfits." His first shows included works by Vanessa Beecroft, Jocelyn Taylor, Nari Ward, Yoko Ono, and Mariko Mori. Soon after, he bought the building housing Canal Lumber, a bigger space around the corner on Wooster Street. The first major exhibition project there was of a Barbara Kruger video-and-slide-projection show in 1997.

Deitch Projects became associated with provocative performance art and exhibitions addressing sexuality, bodily functions, and social taboos. A 1997 profile in The Art Newspaper discussed exhibitions involving works by Beth B, Emiko Kasahara, Noritoshi Hirakawa, and Oleg Kulik. The article described Kulik's performance in which he assumed the behavior of a dog, including defecating in the gallery. The publication reported that some of Deitch's exhibitions had been criticized as sensationalist while attracting audiences beyond the conventional contemporary art market.

An early advocate of graffiti art in the 1980s, he later introduced New York to the style of street art which had originated in San Francisco in the 1990s among artists on the fringe of the skateboard scene. Deitch became well known as a supporter of young artists like Kehinde Wiley and Cecily Brown, while also representing the work of more established artists like Keith Haring and Jeff Koons. In the 1990s, Deitch helped fund Koons' expensive “Celebration series” and also organized the artist’s 50th birthday party at his gallery. The production of Koons's Celebration series created substantial financial difficulties for Deitch, who was involved in financing the project. In September 1997, Sotheby's acquired a 50% interest in Deitch Projects. A 2007 profile in The New Yorker reported that the transaction helped Deitch address the costs associated with the production of Koons's sculptures and paintings.

In conjunction with Creative Time and Paper Magazine, Deitch Projects also organized SoHo's annual Art Parade, with over 1,000 participants from 2005 to 2008.

=== Museum of Contemporary Art, Los Angeles ===
In 2010, Jeffery Deitch was appointed Director to the Museum of Contemporary Art, Los Angeles (MOCA), which was seeking to recover from low attendance and a near-bankruptcy following the Great Recession. Before stepping into the new role, Deitch closed Deitch Projects and also resigned from the Basquiat authentication committee. Deitch had maintained a professional relationship with billionaire art collector and philanthropist Eli Broad since the early 1980s. Following Broad's death in 2021, Deitch credited him with playing an instrumental role in bringing Deitch to Los Angeles to direct MOCA. Deitch stated that they met or spoke weekly over several years while collaborating on museum's programming, finances, and fundraising.

During his three-year tenure, Deitch advised and curated seminal exhibitions such as Dennis Hopper: Double Standard (2010), The Painting Factory: Abstraction After Warhol (2012) and Art in the Streets (2011), the first major U.S. museum survey of graffiti and street art. In 2013, he helped organize a show by Urs Fischer in which the artist collaborated with 1000 LA residents to fill an exhibition space with clay figures. Additionally, Deitch conceived MOCAtv, the first original YouTube channel dedicated to fine art. Deitch donated his after-tax salary back to the museum throughout his tenure.

In November 2011, MOCA held a fundraising gala featuring performances conceived by artist Marina Abramović, including performers positioned as living centerpieces at dinner tables and nude performers lying beneath artificial skeletons. Choreographer Yvonne Rainer publicly criticized the planned performances, raising concerns about performer compensation, exploitation, and the treatment of performers by wealthy museum donors. Deitch defended the project and invited Rainer to attend a rehearsal before judging the performance. Following the event, several participating performers told the Los Angeles Times that they disagreed with the allegations of exploitation, although some described uncomfortable interactions with attendees.

By 2012, Deitch's directorship led to what one commentator called a "cultural collision" between Deitch's more popular art tastes and MOCA's previous interests. Though Deitch was acknowledged to have boosted museum attendance to record levels, critics charged that MOCA's shows sometimes prioritized popular exhibits over artists who were well-known in the LA art scene or over more traditional scholarly concerns. In 2012, as the conflict grew, MOCA's board of trustees unanimously voted to ask for the resignation of its longtime chief curator Paul Schimmel, leading to the resignation of four artists on MOCA's board in protest. Deitch resigned from MOCA the following year.

=== Return to art dealing ===
In 2014, Deitch published Live the Art on the 15-year history of Deitch Projects. In 2015, he began hosting shows at 76 Grand Street in New York, one of his former gallery spaces. In July 2016, he reopened his Lower Manhattan gallery at 18 Wooster Street, the space he ran from 1996 to 2010 and rented out to the Swiss Institute for the following five years. Deitch now runs the two spaces under Jeffrey Deitch Inc. Since reopening the gallery, Deitch has organized exhibitions by Ai Weiwei, Kenny Scharf, Austin Lee, Bisa Butler, Kenturah Davis, Sasha Gordon, Kennedy Yanko, and Walter Robinson, among others.

Every year, during Art Basel Miami Beach, Deitch's gallery collaborates with art dealer Larry Gagosian on a thematic exhibition. From 2015 to 2021, the exhibitions were housed in The Moore Building of Miami's Design District.

In 2018, Deitch opened a new 15,000-square-foot (1,400-square-metre) space in Hollywood, designed by Frank Gehry, specifically to mount what he described as "museum-level" exhibitions. The gallery was inaugurated with a solo exhibition of Ai Weiwei, followed by shows by Urs Fischer, Judy Chicago, Robert Longo, Nadia Lee Cohen, George Clinton, and Refik Anadol, among others. The gallery has also organized large-scale thematic exhibitions such as Shattered Glass (curated by AJ Girard and Melahn Frierson, 2021), Clay Pop (curated by Alia Dahl, 2022), and Wonder Women (curated by Kathy Huang, 2023).

In November 2018, Deitch provided his SoHo gallery space to Downtown for Democracy, an artist-led political organization, for an event titled Protest Factory ahead of the United States midterm elections. The event featured political poster-making, artwork critical of President Donald Trump, and other activities intended to encourage political participation. Deitch described the initiative as participation in the American democratic process and encouraged other galleries and businesses to become civically involved.

In 2019, Deitch edited Unrealism, a publication on new figurative painting featuring the most groundbreaking contemporary artists and their important predecessors. The following year, he conceived the creation of the Gallery Association Los Angeles (GALA), to "generate excitement about the L.A. gallery scene" and shared his idea with a group of gallerists in Los Angeles. In May 2020, GALA launched galleryplatform.la, an online platform that serves the dynamic Los Angeles art community with editorial content and rotating online viewing rooms. In 2022, Deitch opened a second location in a historic building on Santa Monica Boulevard, the former home of Radio Recorders, a studio that recorded Elvis Presley and Billie Holiday, among others.

From February 8 to April 11, 2020, Deitch's Los Angeles gallery presented All of Them Witches, a group exhibition organized by artist Laurie Simmons and curator Dan Nadel. The exhibition explored representations of witchcraft, supernatural imagery, occult symbolism, and their connection to themes of power, gender, and the human body. In an April 2020 review for Contemporary Art Review Los Angeles, critic Michael Wright argued that the exhibition's emphasis on occult aesthetics overlooked some of the distinct spiritual and religious traditions represented in the participating artists' work.

Periodically, Deitch hosts artisan marketplaces in the back courtyard of his flagship Los Angeles location.

From September 12, 2024, to January 18, 2025, Deitch presented a new version of Post Human at his Los Angeles gallery, revisiting the themes of his original 1992 exhibition. The exhibition brought together artists from the original project and younger generation whose work examined bodily transformation, artificial intelligence, technology, and contemporary representations of identity. In March 2025 review published in Contemporary Art Review Los Angeles, critic Zoey Greenwald questioned whether the new exhibition successfully connected its earlier ideas with the technological and cultural conditions of the present. In March 2026, The Monacelli Press published an expanded Post Human book, edited by Viola Angiolini, with texts by Deitch, philosopher Rosi Braidotti, and critic Philippa Snow.
