= Santa Maria di Propezzano =

Former-Benedictine abbey and church in Abruzzo, Italy

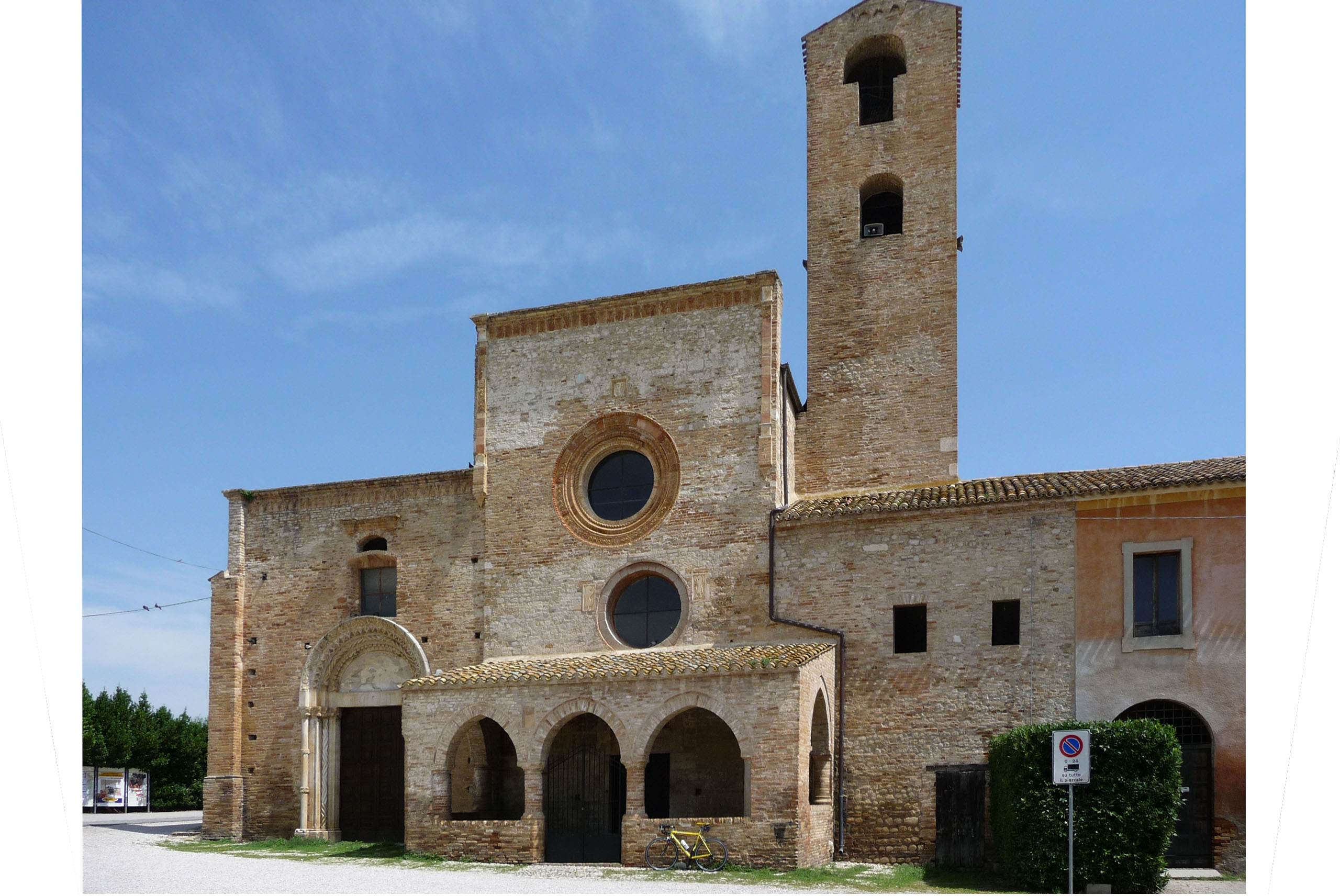
Chiesa di Santa Maria di Propezzano.jpg

Santa Maria di Propezzano is a Romanesque-style, former-Benedictine abbey and church located along Strada Provinziale 22C, in the Vomano valley, near the hamlet of Morro D'Oro, in the province of Teramo, region of Abruzzo, Italy.

== History ==
Apparently the site was occupied in pre-Christian times, but tradition holds that on May 10, 715, an apparition of the Virgin (Santa Maria de Propitiano) occurred. The Marian devotion which signifies the Holy Mary propitiating miseries was altered by dialect to Propezzano. The site was granted indulgences by Pope Boniface II in 1393. The abbey became wealthy in land but then appropriated by the Dukes of Atri.

During the Middle Ages its attached monastery was on the pilgrimage route from Italy to the Holy Land.

The sculpted portal, so-called Holy Door (circa 1315), was completed by Raimondo del Poggio; behind it is the belltower. The façade has three different heights. The center has a three-arched porch with traces of 15th-century frescos.

The interior has a nave and two lateral aisles separated by rounded arches. The convent has a 16th-century cloister. Sebastiano Majewski frescoed the cloister's lunettes; whereas, the refectory's 16th-century frescos depict the history of the foundation of the church.
