= Luca Beatrice =

Italian art critic and curator (1961–2025)

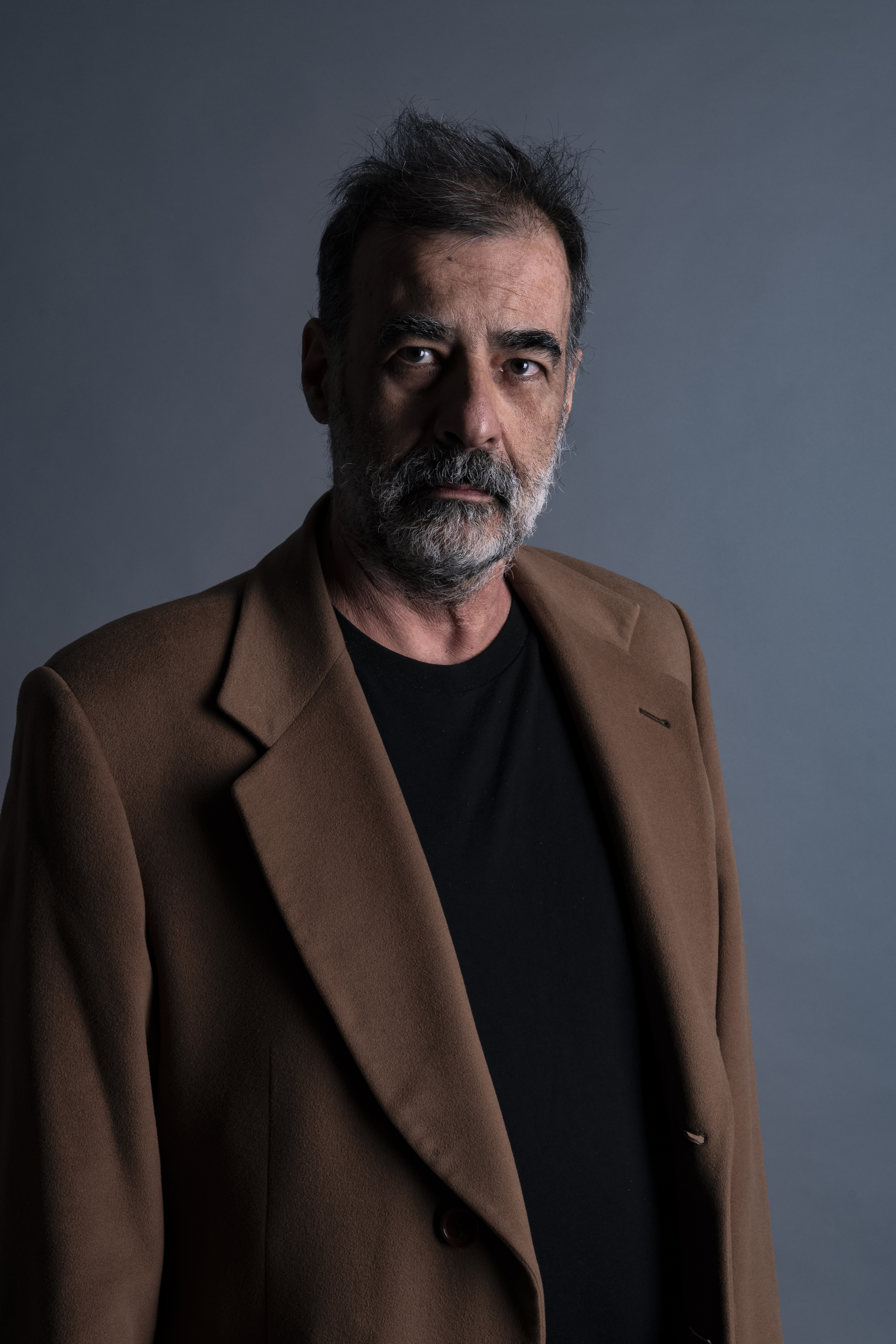
Beatrice in 2020

Luca Beatrice (4 April 1961 – 21 January 2025) was an Italian art critic, exhibition curator and author. He co-curated the Italian Pavilion at the 53rd Venice Biennale in 2009 and served as president of the Quadriennale di Roma from 2024 until his death in 2025.

== Early life and education ==
Beatrice was born in Turin on 4 April 1961. He graduated in film history from the University of Turin and subsequently obtained a postgraduate qualification in art history from the University of Siena.

== Career ==
Beatrice began his career as an art critic, contributing to specialist publications including Flash Art and Tema Celeste. During the 1990s, he became involved in the curation of exhibitions of contemporary Italian art. He also taught at the Brera Academy in Milan and at IULM University.

From 2003 to 2005, he worked as a curator of the Prague Biennale.

In 2009, Beatrice co-curated the Italian Pavilion at the 53rd Venice Biennale alongside art historian Beatrice Buscaroli.

From 2010 to 2018, he was president of the Circolo dei Lettori, a cultural institution based in Turin.

His curatorial work included exhibitions devoted to Andy Warhol and Jackson Pollock. In 2016, he co-curated an exhibition of works by Edward Hopper at Palazzo Fava in Bologna, alongside Barbara Haskell of the Whitney Museum of American Art.

In 2019, Beatrice curated Revolutions 1989–2019: L'arte del mondo nuovo – 30 anni dopo, held at Castel Sismondo in Rimini from 6 July to 25 August. The exhibition presented works by Italian artists associated with the period between 1989 and 1991.

In February 2024, Beatrice was appointed president of the Fondazione La Quadriennale di Roma. His appointment was made by decree of the Italian Minister of Culture on 7 February 2024.

== Death ==
Beatrice died at the Molinette hospital in Turin on 21 January 2025, aged 63, following a heart attack.

== After his death ==
The programme of the 2026 Turin International Book Fair included a discussion entitled Lo stato attuale della critica d'arte italiana (The current state of Italian art criticism), addressing Italian art criticism one year after Beatrice's death. The event was scheduled for 17 May 2026.

== Bibliography ==
=== Selected works by Beatrice ===
- Beatrice, Luca (2010). Da che arte stai? Una storia revisionista dell'arte italiana. Milan: Rizzoli. ISBN 9788817037839.
- Beatrice, Luca (2013). Sex. Erotismi nell'arte da Courbet a YouPorn. Milan: Rizzoli. ISBN 9788817065504.
- Beatrice, Luca (2021). Da che arte stai? 10 lezioni sul contemporaneo. Mondadori Electa. ISBN 9788891831514.
- Beatrice, Luca (2023). Le vite. Un racconto provinciale dell'arte italiana. Marsilio. ISBN 9788829719525.
- Beatrice, Luca (2025). La commedia dell'arte. Dietro le quinte del contemporaneo tra musei, mercato e provocazioni. Marsilio. ISBN 9788829791279.

=== Works about Beatrice ===
- Brunelli, Roberto (2026). Dopo Luca. La critica d'arte italiana dopo Beatrice. Rimini: NFC Edizioni. ISBN 8867265350.
