= Kathe Burkhart =

American artist, painter, writer and art critic

- Miller
- Born: 1958 (age 67–68); Martinsburg, West Virginia
- Education: California Institute of the Arts, Santa Clarita, CA (1982 BFA, 1984 MFA)
- Known for: The Liz Taylor Series (1982–ongoing); Torture Paintings (1992–2001)
- Notable work: Fuck You: from the Liz Taylor Series (after Bert Stern) (1984)
- Style: interdisciplinary artist, painter, punk art, post-pop
- Spouse: Jozef van Wissem (ex-husband)

Kathe Burkhart (born 1958, Martinsburg, West Virginia) is an American interdisciplinary artist, painter, writer and art critic. Described as both a conceptual artist and an installation artist, she uses various media in her work, combining collage, digital media, drawing, fiction, installation, nonfiction, painting, photography video, poetry, and sculpture. The content is feminist; the radical female is the subject. The Liz Taylor painting series, which she began painting in 1982, have been exhibited at the MoMA PS1, the Stedelijk Museum, and the Venice Biennale. Burkhart is also the author of literary fiction and poetry.

== The Liz Taylor Series ==
Burkhart's The Liz Taylor Series (1982-ongoing) is a self-portrait project in which the artist uses the image of the actress Elizabeth Taylor as alter ego to explore fantasies and evoke the artists genderqueer identity. Stills of Taylor taken from her films are painted in a deliberate 'bad'-painting style with profane text imposed on top. The writer and art historian Jane Ursula Harris wrote that Burkhart's work embodies "ribald humor and [a] feminist-punk attitude." Artist Keith Mayerson has said of Burkhart's series, "Reproduced chronologically, the portraits take on new life as a visual diary, a pictorial narrative in which we witness how women's freedom and spirit have been repressed by male-dominated capitalist culture, with Liz Taylor as our courageous avatar".

== Legacy ==
Burkhart is regarded as a significant figure in contemporary feminist art. Her sustained interrogation of celebrity, gender, and self-representation has influenced subsequent generations of artists working with appropriation, text-image relationships, and identity politics. In 2016, the artist gifted her personal archives to the Fales Library and Special Collections at the New York University. The "Kathe Burkhart Papers" are part of the library's Downtown Collection documenting New York's vibrant arts scene from the 1970s through the early 1990s.

== Exhibitions ==
=== Individual exhibitions ===
- 1988 Paintings from the Liz Taylor Series, Feature, Chicago, and Greathouse, New York
- 1989 Kathe Burkhart by Elizabeth Taylor, Feature, New York
- 1991 People in Hell Want Ice Water, Feature, New York Works on Paper from the Liz Taylor Series, Dennis Anderson Galerie, Antwerp
- 1992 Selected Works from the Liz Taylor Series, Shoshana Wayne Gallery, Los Angeles
- 1993 Iron Hand in a Velvet Glove, Dennis Anderson Gallery, Antwerp Velvet Revolution, Galleria in Arco, Turin, Italy White Room, White Columns, New York
- 1994 Ohio State University, Columbus
- 1995 Bad, Stelling Gallery, Leiden, Netherlands
- 1997 Selected Works, Galerie De Lege Ruimte, Gent, Belgium Constriction, Cultural Centrum Bruges, Belgium Selected Works from the Liz Taylor Series 1986–1997, Serge Sorokko Gallery, New York
- 2007 The Liz Taylor Series -- Selections from 1983 - 2007, Alexander Gray Associates, New York, NY.
- 2007–2008 Kathe Burkhart MoMA PS1 Contemporary Art Center, New York, NY
- 2016 Kathe Burkhart Drawings Fierman, New York, NY

=== Selected group exhibitions ===
- 1981 National Small Sculpture & Drawing Exhibition, Westwood Center for the Arts, Los Angeles
- 1987 Head Sex, Feature, Chicago
- 1990 The Plague Years, Ground Zero, New York Sex and Language, Garnet Press Gallery, Toronto
- 1991 Original Sin, Hillwood Art Museum, Brookville, New York Painting Culture, fiction/nonfiction, New York
- 1992 Tattoo Collection, Air de Paris, Nice, France (traveling) Ballots or Bullets, Sally Hawkins Gallery, New York From Media to Metaphor: Art About Aids, Emerson Gallery, Clinton, New York (traveled throughout U.S.) Beyond Loss: Art in the Era of AIDS, Washington Project for the Arts, Washington D.C.
- 1994 Bad Girls West, UCLA Wight Art Gallery, Los Angeles Medialismo, FlashArt Museum, Trevi, Italy
- 1995 Fuori Uso, Caravanserai of Contemporary Art, Pescara, Italy Alternatives: 20 Years of Hallwalls 1975–95, Burchfield Penney Art Center, Buffalo, New York
- 1996 Real Fake, Neuberger Museum of Art, Purchase, New York
- 1997 Irredeemable Skeletons, Shillam and Smith, London The Gaze, Momenta Art, Brooklyn, New York Cul(t) de Sac(re), Art Kitchen, Amsterdam Autoportrait, Exit Art, New York Cool It, Art Kitchen, Amsterdam Red Light District: Images of Desire, Galerie Ijburg, Amsterdam
- 1998 Frightful Paint, Arti ef Amicitae, Amsterdam Drawing the Conclusion, Anna Kustera Gallery, New York

== Books ==
By Kathe Burkhart

- —From Under From Under the 8-Ball. Self-published. 1985.
- —The Double Standard. New York: Participant Inc. 2005. ISBN 097654431-8.
  - —Deux poids, deux mesures [The Double Standard]. Translated by Bouchard, Corinne. Paris: Hachette Littérature. 2001. ISBN 2-0123-5593-5.
- —Deux âmes sœurs [Between the Lines]. Translated by Bismuth, Daniel. Paris: Hachette Littérature. 2006. ISBN 2-01-235712-1.
- —Dudes. New York: Participant Inc. 2014. ISBN 978-0-9802324-6-2.

== Catalogs ==
- Romano, Gianni, ed. (1993). Kathe Burkhart: Velvet Talk. Turin: Galleria In Arco.
- Dewilde, Michel, ed. (1997). Kathe Burkhart: Constriction, the Torture Paintings. Bruges: Culturcentrum Brugge.
- Burkhart, Kathe (2005). Bad Girl: Works from 1983–2000. New York: Hanus Press. ISBN 097654430X.
- Burkhart, Kathe (2007). The Liz Taylor Series: The First 25 Years, 1982–2007. New York: Regentsy Arts Press. ISBN 978-0-9749037-8-1.

== Readings and performances ==
5 Minute Performance Olympics, High Performance, Los Angeles, 1984; Anti-Club, Lhasa Club, Los Angeles, 1985; Beyond Baroque, Venice, California, 1985; TV Generations Reading, LACE, Los Angeles, 1986; ABC NO RIO, New York, 1986; Feature, Chicago, and Greathouse, New York, 1988; 6 Women: The Word and the Will, The Knitting Factory, New York, 1989; Brand Name Damages, Brooklyn and elsewhere, 1991; Newyorican Poets Cafe, 1992; The Banquet, Thread Waxing Space, New York, 1992; Jail of Gender; A Theatrical Adaptation of the Poetry, Prose, and Visual Art of Kathe Burkhart, Cafe Voltaire and Transient Theatre, Chicago, 1994; Bob Flanagan Memorial Reading, Poetry Project, New York, 1996.
