= José Antonio Hernández-Díez =

Venezuelan-born artist

Jose Antonio Hernandez-Diez
- Born: Jose Antonio Hernandez-Diez; 1964 (age 61–62); Caracas, Venezuela
- Education: Centro de Formación Cinematográfica de Caracas
- Known for: Sculpture, Photography, Installation art
- Style: Conceptual art, Pop culture references
- Movement: Contemporary art

Jose Antonio Hernandez-Diez (1964, Caracas) is a Venezuelan-born artist who works with sculpture, photography and installation art. Hernandez-Diez currently lives and works in Barcelona, Spain and Caracas, Venezuela.

== Biography ==
Jose Antonio Hernandez-Diez studied at el Centro de Formación Cinematográfica de Caracas. His work has been included in numerous exhibitions, including the 2003 Venice Bienniale and the 1999 Carnegie International. Since 1991, Hernandez-Diez has had solo exhibitions of his work in São Paulo, New York City, Madrid and Caracas, among many others. Hernández-Díez also had a major retrospective exhibition that travelled to a number of museums including the New Museum in New York City, SITE Santa Fe and the Palm Beach Institute of Contemporary Art, Palm Beach, Florida from 2002 to 2003.

Hernández-Díez is part of a new generation of Venezuelan artists who emerged in the late 1980s. He uses "street" materials such as skateboards, sneakers, record players and other audio equipment and bicycles in order to develop a personal iconography centered on familiar, often domestic, objects. The ordinary is made extraordinary through Hernández-Díez's provocative, darkly humorous use of material and scale. He manipulates the objects, often by physically reconfiguring them in such a way that invests the quotidian with philosophical and emotional resonance. Elements from his Venezuelan childhood are combined with those that reference a more global pop culture.
