= Bigert & Bergström =

Swedish artist duo

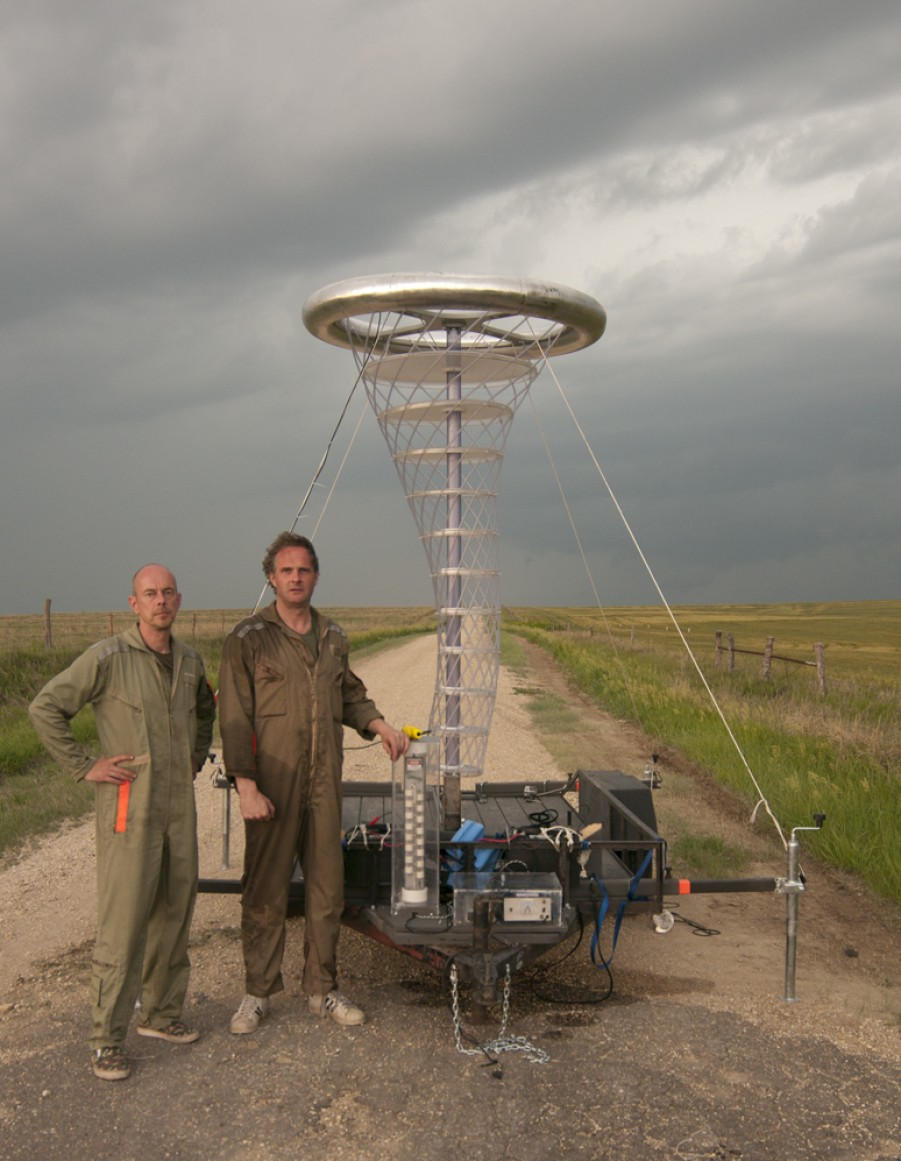
Bigert & Bergström, in front of the tornado diverter, still shot from the shooting of the Weather War, 2012

Bigert & Bergström is a Swedish artist duo consisting of Mats Bigert and Lars Bergström.

The Bigert & Bergström creative partnership began in 1986 while attending Royal Swedish Academy of Arts in Stockholm. Since then, the duo have created a wide range of art projects that have been internationally recognized and exhibited. Their productions range through large-scale sculptures, installations, public portrayals, performance and film – often combined in multimedia works.

== Artistic focus ==
With energetic inquisitiveness, the duo analyses and poses questions regarding current societal issues, often using humor as a tool. They tend to focus on scientific, climate-related and social issues, and the intersection between them. These topics define the theme, as well as the practical creation of the works – often through high-tech solutions, scientific foundations and various experimental elements.

=== Expressions through sculpture and installations ===
Whether created for an exhibition, a film or a public space, Bigert & Bergström's creations have certain common denominators in their forms of expression. Their works are often intended to be experienced through multiple senses; many sculptures exude warmth, vibrations, light and sound, or can be set in motion and change. Their works encourage, and sometimes require viewer-interaction. They are often constructed on a large scale, many times large enough to step into the work and experience it from inside.

This angle of having the viewer physically step into the work, has been a feature of the duo's creations since the very beginning. In the 1990s, Bigert & Bergström were best known for their climate chamber – a space in which the viewer could enter and be confronted with various types of extreme weather. Other recurring elements are the funhouse mirrors, molecular, spherical and semi-spherical shapes. For these round forms, Bigert & Bergström have developed their own technique, which they call 'back projection.' It involves filming with a fisheye lens to project inverted images on rounded shapes.

== Selected works ==
=== Tipping Point (2021) ===
The interdisciplinary project was realised in collaboration between Bigert & Bergström and the Institute for Futures Studies (IFFS), Stockholm. The project's main area of inquiry embedded in climate ethics, while aiming to create a visual, physical and poetic experience in a clear and committed manner. The performative installation envisages the complex connection between our decisions today and the living conditions for future generations.

=== Rescue Blanket for Kebnekaise (2015) ===
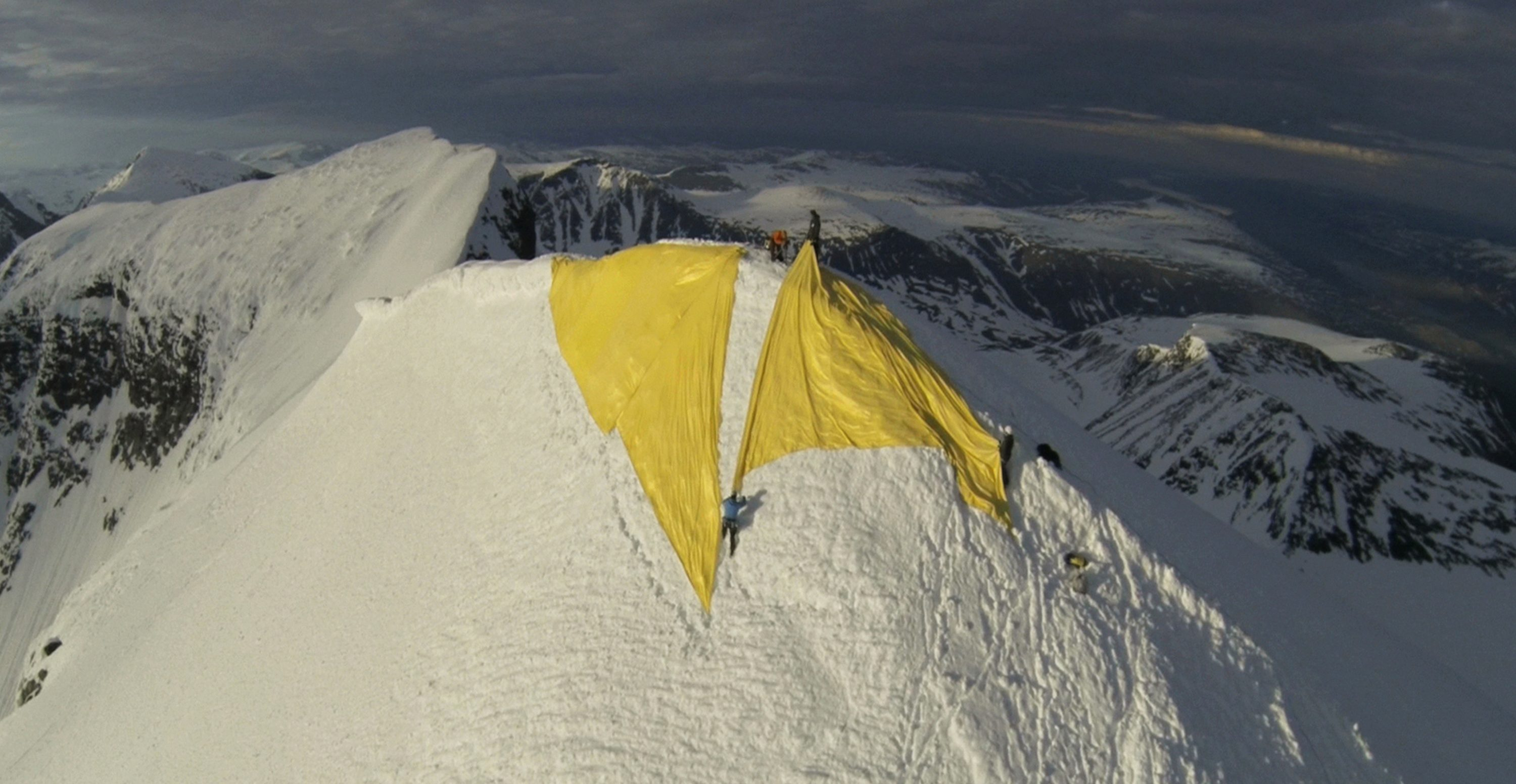
Rescue Blanket for Kebnekaise, geo-engineering performance, 2015. Photo documentation. Photo: Studio Bigert & Bergström

Bigert & Bergström's geoengineering performance was an attempt, a futile symbolic gesture to counteract the glacier melting of Kebnekaise, the highest mountain in Sweden, which gradually losing its elevation. In 2015 during the summer solstice, the mountain's southern peak was covered with a five-hundred-square-meter golden climate-shade cloth, to preserve the glacier. The performance documentation and materials collected during the intervention turned into an installation entitled The Freeze.

=== Climate Chambers I (1994) ===
The large-scale installation consists of five chambers, which surround a centrally located incubator. By entering into the chambers, the audience experiences various climate extremes from heat to freeze. The installation intended to "test the boundaries between experience and endurance." The work is not only challenging our perception and senses, but also raises the question of whether perceiving artworks is influenced by the atmospheric or ambient shifts.

=== Biosphere III (1990) ===
Biosphere III was a large-scale performance installation, performed and constructed in collaboration with the Oslo-based Gallery Riis in 1990. Bigert & Bergström's work was inspired by the Biosphere II, an utopian experiment of self-supporting ecosystem, launched in 1984 in the Sonora Desert (Tucson, Arizona, USA). The artist duo's inverted biosphere were a gradually inflating tent. Inside, the audience could follow the artists' actions and relevance of various dioramas (melting ice-monoliths, mechanical greenhouse) through windows. The performance culminated when the artists exited the biosphere.

== Selected public works ==
Bigert & Bergström have created a number of public works of art and are considered skilled at depicting complex concepts. Their public works are tactile and often encourage the viewer for interaction. Through digital technology, the works frequently change color and shape – either through human interaction, as in the "Cymatic Pool", or through uncontrollable factors like weather phenomena, as in "Tomorrow’s Weather."

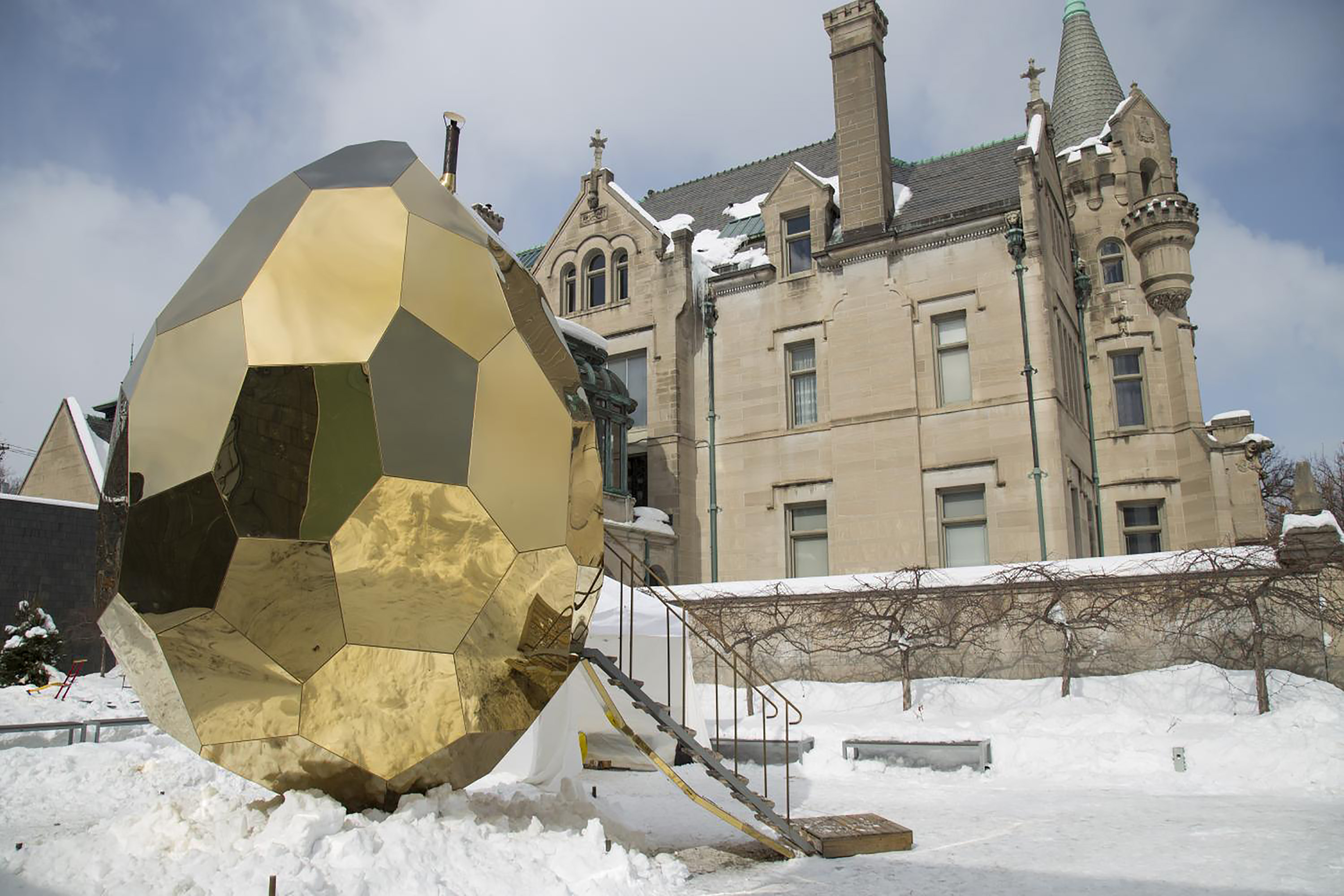
Bigert & Bergström, Solar Egg in Minneapolis, 2019

=== BBQ Meteorite (2022) ===
The social sculpture, BBQ Meteorite is a functioning outdoor grill, made for Kvarteret Ekdungen and commissioned by Tom Radway, Förvaltaren AB. The shape of the three-meter high work was inspired by the Youndegin meteorite found in Western Australia in 1884. The artwork invites the locals to use it for barbecues and as a social space.

=== Solar Egg (2017) ===
Solar Egg, a fully functioning egg-shaped sauna, was commissioned by Riksbyggen and placed in Kiruna, northern Sweden. The work, while conceptually reflecting on the ongoing geographical re-positioning of the city of Kiruna, was also imagined to be a platform for discussion. A place for reflection and contemplation on the most burning social and environmental issues of nowadays.

=== Cymatic Pool (2013) ===
Cymatic Pool created for Ericsson's headquarters in Kista, Stockholm. The work is an interactive pool with its own phone number. By calling it, the spectators is able to talk to the work: the sound waves of their voices affect the water's surface, creating various patterns.

=== Tomorrow’s Weather (2012) ===
The art work Tomorrow's Weather at Stockholm Central Station was commissioned by Public Art Agency Sweden. It consists of atmospheric molecules suspended from the ceiling, which are connected to a weather service. Depending on the following day's weather forecast, the molecules change colour between pink, green, blue and yellow. Den som passerar verket vid upprepade tillfällen kan lära sig att läsa av färgerna och få en föraning om morgondagens väder.

=== Co2 Lock-in (2012) ===
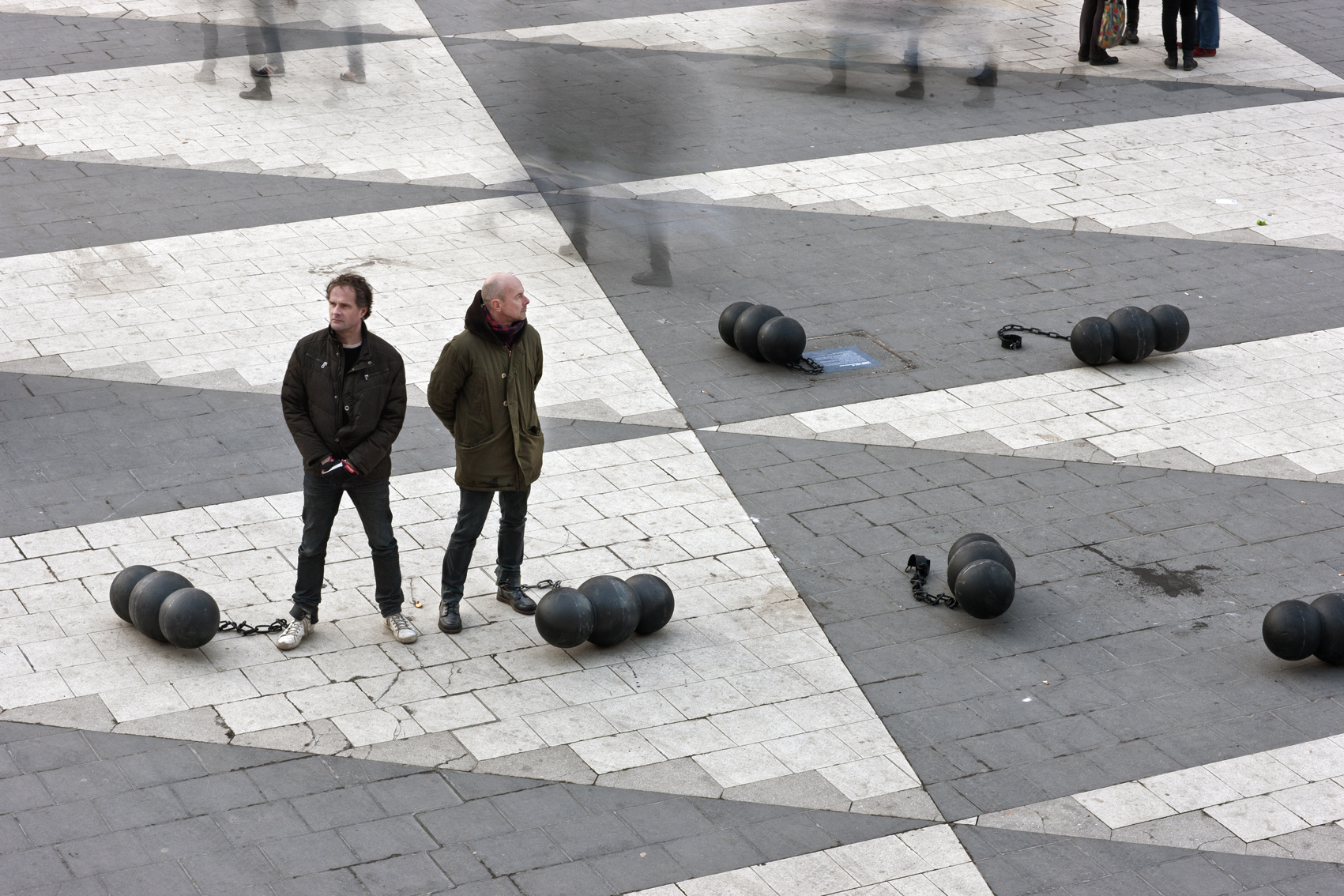
Co2 lock in, 2012, Bigert & Bergström at Sergels Torg Square in Stockholm

Co2 Lock-in is a performance work and a sculptural installation in Stockholm on 16–31 March 2012. A series of leg-irons in the shape of carbon dioxide molecules were placed out in several central locations. In one of these locations, the artists themselves were shackled for a day. The sculptures, moulded out of recycled iron and weighing 300 kg each, represent the amount of carbon dioxide an average Swede emits over a 10-day period. The project was a collaboration between Bigert & Bergström and WWF to call attention to the worldwide climate action Earth Hour.

=== More public works ===
- Wave Pillar, 2022, Helsingborg harbour
- Painters Mussel, 2021, Stångåbro, Linköping
- Apple of Knowledge, 2021, Boo Gård School, Nacka
- Cumulus Humilis (The Humble Cloud), 2021, Sunderby Hospital, Luleå
- Tree Time, 2021, Växjö Railway Station and Commune House
- Heat Shimmer Wall (Fata Morgana), 2020, St. Erik Eye Hospital, Stockholm
- Space Seed, 2020, Biskopsudden, Stockholm
- Sunshell, 2019, Sjötullstorget, Norrtälje
- Tip of an Iceberg, 2019, Karolinska Hospital, Stockholm
- Face au Temps, 2017, Hopital Saint Denis, Paris
- Mirror Dewdrops and Mother-of-Pearl Clouds, 2016, Psychiatric Center, Trelleborg
- Tomorrow's Weather Lexington, 2015, 21c Museum Hotel, Kentucky
- Cloud Portico, Falling Apple, Rainbow Family, 2014, Lugnet School, Hammarby Sjöstad, Stockholm
- Tornado Touch Down, 2010, outside the central station, Borås
- Sun Passage, 2010, Hammarby sjöstad, Stockholm
- Peptalk 2, 2005, Älta indoor ice rink, Stockholm
- Ecco Humor, 2003, in the multi-storey carpark at the Dunker Culture House, Helsingborg
- Flash of Genius, 2002, Nacka Kulturhus, Stockholm
- Thought Incognita, 2001, Linköping University
- Koma/Amok, 1997, Umedalen skulpturpark, Umeå

== Selected films ==
Bigert & Bergström produced their first film, The Big Feed, in 1999. Since its debut, they have increasingly developed their characteristic forms of expression, combining facts and anecdotes with experiments, animations, sculptural installations and objects in what may be described as contemporary art documentaries. The Big Feed and several other films in the artists’ repertoire were commissioned by the Swedish Television, Sveriges Television. They have been aired in several cultural programmes, including Kobra (television programme) and K-special, and at many international film festivals.

=== The Climate Experiment (2018, 58 min. HD) ===
A film about Bigert & Bergström's climate-related art, which for three decades has been inspired by research on the effects of climate on humanity and vice versa. The Climate Experiment tells the story of the growing realization of our own role in the changing climate. Our interference in the atmospheric cocktail could be described as the greatest experiment in human history. An experiment whose outcome is highly uncertain.

=== Moments of Silence (2014, 14 min. HD) ===
Moments of Silence consists of sampled archival materials from all sorts of occasions in which people have come together in a moment of silence to honor and mourn the victims of natural disasters and other tragedies, or to take a stand against terrorism and other acts of violence. The film reflects on how this worldwide ritual is one of the few activities in which all people, regardless of religion, ideology or cultural background, can come together in fellowship.

=== The Weather War (2012, 57 min. HD) ===
The film provides a historical and contemporary sketch of human attempts to tame the forces of weather. Many different weapons are used worldwide – Bangladesh builds barrier walls to protect against flooding, China aims rockets at threatening clouds, and Italy fires cannons at hail to protect the year's wine harvest. Given this background, the film focuses on the question of how to deal with the ongoing climatic change – by adapting, or by waging war on the weather? In a quirky blend of land-art performance and old-fashioned road movie, Bigert & Bergström traveled to the tornado belt of the American Midwest with their mechanical sculpture, Tornado Diverter, to see if they can stop a tornado. This visionary machine is the brainchild of Russian scientist Vladimir Pudov. Newly retired when the duo contacted him, Pudov was no longer able to build his invention, but Bigert & Bergström were so fascinated by his machine that they decided to build it for him.

=== The Last Supper (2005, 57 min. 16 mm and DVD) ===
This film looks at the tradition of serving one last meal to condemned prisoners, a wish that has been granted as long as death sentences have been implemented. The tradition stems from ancient burial rituals, in which the deceased was served food on his deathbed to ensure that he would not come back to haunt the living as a hungry ghost. The modern ritual has no connection to its roots, and serving a last meal seems as anachronistic and absurd as the punishment itself. The film focuses on this gap between the historic meaning and the contemporary use of a tradition that has lost its meaning. The protagonist in the film is Brian Price, a former prisoner at Huntsville State Prison in Texas, who cooked over 200 last meals during his 14-year prison sentence.

=== More films ===
- VMA - Vital Message to All, 2015, 15 min. HD
- The Mouse, 2012, 27.30 min. HD
- Life Extended, 2009, 57 min. HD
- Tunnel Vision, 2008, 27 min. HD
- If You Don´t Like the weather, Change It, 2007, 22 min. HD, DV
- The Big Feed, 1999, 11 min. DV

== Selection of exhibitions ==
In the same year that Bigert & Bergström earned their degree (1990), they held their first solo show at the Riis Gallery in Oslo. Three years later, they were invited to open the Venice Biennale. That became the start of an active career in the art world, leading to solid credentials in the field.

Selected solo exhibitions:

- 2022 Tipping Point, Djurgården, Stockholm
- 2022 Inside the Weather – a Synaptic Battlefield, Nässjö Konsthall
- 2022 Hurricane Party, Norrtälje Konsthall
- 2021 Tipping Point, Rikstolvan - Skånefrö's warehouse, Hammenhög
- 2020 Scenario/Scenery, Eskilstuna konstmuseum
- 2019 Bigert & Bergström. Taverna Brillo, Stockholm
- 2019 Prosthesis, Gallery Belenius, Stockholm
- 2018 The Climate Experiment, Dunkers Kulturhus, Helsingborg
- 2018 Prognosis, Örebro Konsthall
- 2018 Solar Egg, Kunsthal Charlottenborg, Copenhagen
- 2017 Eye of the Storm, Artipelag, Stockholm
- 2017 The Weather War, Shanghai Minsheng Art Museum
- 2016 The Freeze, Belenius/Nordenhake, Stockholm
- 2015 Explosion of Speech, Goethe Institute, Thessaloniki
- 2015 The Weather War Växjö konsthall
- 2014 The Drought Varberg Konsthall
- 2014 The Weather War, Galerie Barbara Thumm, Berlin
- 2013 The Drought, Castle of Barletta, Italy; Les Yper Yper, Thessaloniki
- 2012 The Weather War, film installation, Moderna Museet, Stockholm
- 2012 The Mouse, CIS Art Lodgers, Convent de Sant Agusti, Barcelona
- 2010 Know Yourself, Kulturhuset, Stockholm
- 2009 Short Circuit No.18, Cabinet Magazine, Brooklyn, NY
- 2007 If You Don´t Like The Weather, Change It, Künstlerhaus Bethanien
- 2007 Everybody Talks About The Weather, but Nobody Does Anything About It, Uppsala Art Museum
- 2006 Last Supper, Nelson Gallery, UC Davis, San Francisco
- 2004 4 for four, Milliken, Stockholm
- 2003 Full Stop, Rum för berusning I, Vin & Sprithistoriska Museet, Stockholm
- 2002 The Waiting Room, Zinc Gallery, Stockholm
- 1998 Climate Chambers II, Swedish Pavilion, Expo 98, Lisbon
- 1997 Therapy Taxi, Galerie Ursula Walbröl, Düsseldorf
- 1996 Bubblegum Pink, Galleri Lars Bohman, Stockholm
- 1995 LOOP, Künstlerhaus Bethanien, Berlin
- 1990 Biosphere III, Galleri Riis, Oslo

Selected group exhibitions:

- 2022 The Great Outdoors, Skovhuset Kunst & Natur, Værløse, Denmark
- 2022 Novacène, Gare Saint Sauveur, Lille
- 2022 When the Wind Blows, KUNST HAUS WIEN
- 2021 All the Pretty Landscapes, Persons Project, Berlin
- 2020 Tyst vår / Silent Spring, Kaknäs Tower, Djurgården, Stockholm
- 2019 Weather Report, Aldrich Art Museum, Ridgefield, USA
- 2019 Wunderkammer, programming exhibition curated by Nato Thomson, Seattle Art Fair
- 2017 Victory Over the Sun, The Poetics and Politics of Eclipse, KMAC, Louisville, KY
- 2016 Acclimatize, Moderna Museet, Stockholm
- 2016 Surfacing Earth, Röda Sten Konsthall, Gothenburg
- 2014 Liebe/Love, Wilhelm-Hack-Museum, Ludvigshafen
- 2014 urSinnen, Färgfabriken Stockholm
- 2013 14th Videonale, Bonn Kunstmuseum
- 2012 Kaohsiung Museum of Fine Arts, Taiwan
- 2011 Living as Form, Creative Time, New York
- 2010 Eattopia-2010, International Video Art Exhibition, Hung-Gah Museum, Taipei
- 2009 Documentary Fortnight, MoMA, New York
- 2008 Anima(e), Villa Nigra-Anema, Italy
- 2006 Crime & Punishment, Tallinn Art Hall
- 2005 No Man is an Island, Kunstnernes Hus, Oslo
- 2004 Copy-art.net, IBID project, ICA, London
- 2003 In/Out, Trafó Gallery, Budapest
- 2002 Over the Moon, Kunstamt Kreutzberg, Berlin
- 2001 The Future is Now!, Louisiana Museum of Modern Art
- 2000 Circus Circus, Norrtälje Konsthall
- 1999 Game Over, Watari-Um, Tokyo
- 1998 Deathwatch, INSYN, Cultural Capital project, Stockholm 98
- 1997 Umedalens Skulptur 97, Galleri Stefan Andersson, Umeå
- 1996 INTERPOL, Färgfabriken, Stockholm
- 1996 Comp in Box, Galleri Anhava, Helsinki
- 1995 Disneyland After Dark, Uppsala Art Museum
- 1994 What’s in your mind, Swedish National Museum of Science and Technology, Stockholm
- 1994 Aperto 93, 45th Venice Biennial

== Selected bibliography ==
- Bigert & Bergström: Tipping Point, 2021. Exhibition catalogue.
- Weather Report. The Aldrich Contemporary Art Museum, Ridgefield CT, USA, 2019. Exhibition catalogue.
- Bigert & Bergström: Solar Egg. Edited by Jakob Lind. Stockholm: Art and Theory Publishing, 2019.
- Bigert & Bergström: Works 1986-2016. Stockholm: Art and Theory Publishing, 2017.
- Bigert & Bergström. The Freeze, 2015. Exhibition catalogue.
- Bigert & Bergström: The Drought, 2013. Exhibition catalogue.
- Bigert & Bergström: The Storm. Niklas Belenius Gallery, Stockholm, 2012. Exhibition catalogue.
- Bigert & Bergström. The Last Calendar. New York: Cabinet Books, Brooklyn, 2011.
- Bigert & Bergström: Everyone talks about the Weather but No One does Anything About it. Essay by Ronald Jones. Edited by Eva Björkman. Uppsala: Art Museum, 2007. Exhibition catalogue.
