= Giancarlo Politi =

Italian art critic and publisher (1937–2026)

Giancarlo Politi (29 January 1937 – 24 February 2026) was an Italian art critic, poet and publisher, mainly known for being the founder of Flash Art magazine.

== Early life and magazine ==
Politi was born in Trevi, in Umbria. He had a brief spell as an artist and poet before turning to art criticism. In 1965, he moved to Rome, where he started his own art magazine in 1967, a bilingual publication initially called Flash and then changed it to Flash Art. In 1970, he moved the headquarters of the magazine to Milan, where he founded his own publishing house, Politi Editore. Politi started publishing art books, exhibition catalogues, and Art Diary, a directory to artists' studios, art galleries, art critics, and art institutions.

In 1978, Flash Art was split into two separate editions, Flash Art Italia, mostly focused on the Italian market, and Flash Art International, covering the rest of the world. Over the years, several attempts were made to publish the magazine in different languages, including Chinese, Czech, French, German, Russian, and Spanish. In 2004, he launched the first edition of the Flash Art Fair.

== Museum ==
In 1993, Politi founded the Trevi Flash Art Museum. The museum has hosted several exhibitions featuring international artists, including Maurizio Cattelan, Vanessa Beecroft, Damien Hirst, Miltos Manetas, Piero Golia, Andres Serrano, Paola Pivi, Karen Kilimnik, and Mark Kostabi. In 2005, Politi withdrew his support, and the museum is currently operating under the name Palazzo Lucarini Contemporary.

== Biennale ==
In 2001, Giancarlo Politi started the so-called "no-budget biennales". The first one was held in Tirana, Albania, but then, following a disagreement with the local art institutions, he opted for Prague. The first Prague Biennale inaugurated in 2003 and was followed by five other editions as well as three editions of the Prague Photo Biennale.

== Personal life and death ==
Politi was married to fellow art critic Helena Kontova. They had a daughter, Gea, who as of 2009 is an editor at Flash Art.

Politi died on 24 February 2026, at the age of 89.

== Controversies ==
Politi has often been a magnet for controversy. In 1972, he announced from the back page of Flash Art that he was selling his services for $1,000 to galleries, museums, and attractive female artists. In 1997, Politi publicly defended Alexander Brener for spraying a green dollar sign on Kazimir Malevich's painting Suprematisme. In 2011, a story emerged about an intern candidate who was mocked and offended after she has been denied a fair compensation. The episode raised some interest in Italy, due to a permanent situation of exploitation of youth work and skills of young graduates.

== Bibliography ==
- Poesia Umbra Contemporanea, Capitoli, Rome, 1960.
- Linea Umbra, Beniamino Carucci Editore, Rome, 1961.
- Giorgio Celiberti, Gallery 63, New York, 1963.
- Sante Monachesi: Sculture, Bruno Alfieri, Venice, 1965.
- Brajo Fuso, Edizioni Il Foglio, Piombino, Italy, 1967.
- Dario Villalba, Galeria Vandres, Madrid, 1974.
- Italian Painting Today, Multhipla, Milan, 1975.
- Gianni Bertini, Castelli & Rosati, Milan, 1977.
- Francesco Clemente in Belfast, Arts Council of Northern Ireland, 1984.
- Flash Art: Two Decades of History, Politi Editore, Milan, 1990.
- Daniel Spoerri from A to Z, Fondazione Mudima, Milan, 1991.
- Mimmo Paladino, Politi Editore, Milan, 1992.
- Fabio Sargentini, Politi Editore, Milan, 1992.
- Antico Amore, Edizioni Pulcino Elefante, Milan, 1992.
- Panorama Italiano 1, Politi Editore, Milan, 1996.
- Aperto Italia '97, Politi Editore, Milan, 1997.
- Tirana Biennale 1: Escape, Politi Editore, Milan, 2001.
- Prague Biennale 1: Peripheries become the Center, Politi Editore, Milan, 2003.
- Prague Biennale 2: Expanded Painting, Politi Editore, Milan, 2005.
- Pino Pascali, Cambi, Florence, 2006.
- Prague Biennale 3: Glocal and Outsiders: Connecting Cultures in Central Europe, Politi Editore, Milan, 2007
- Prague Biennale 4: Expanded Painting 3, Politi Editore, Milan, 2009.
- Wolf Vostell: Artista europeo, Fondazione Mudima, Milan, 2010.
- Prague Biennale 5: New Location, New Face, Politi Editore, Milan, 2011.
- Prague Biennale 6, Politi Editore, Milan, 2013.
- Amarcord Vol. 1: Racconti Post-situazionisti di Arte e Anti Arte, Politi Seganfreddo, Milan, 2023.
