= Riksbyggen =

Swedish housing company

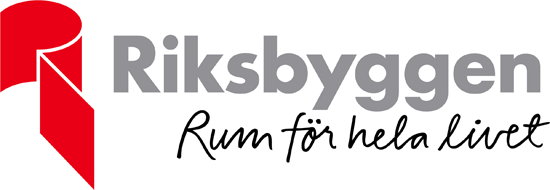

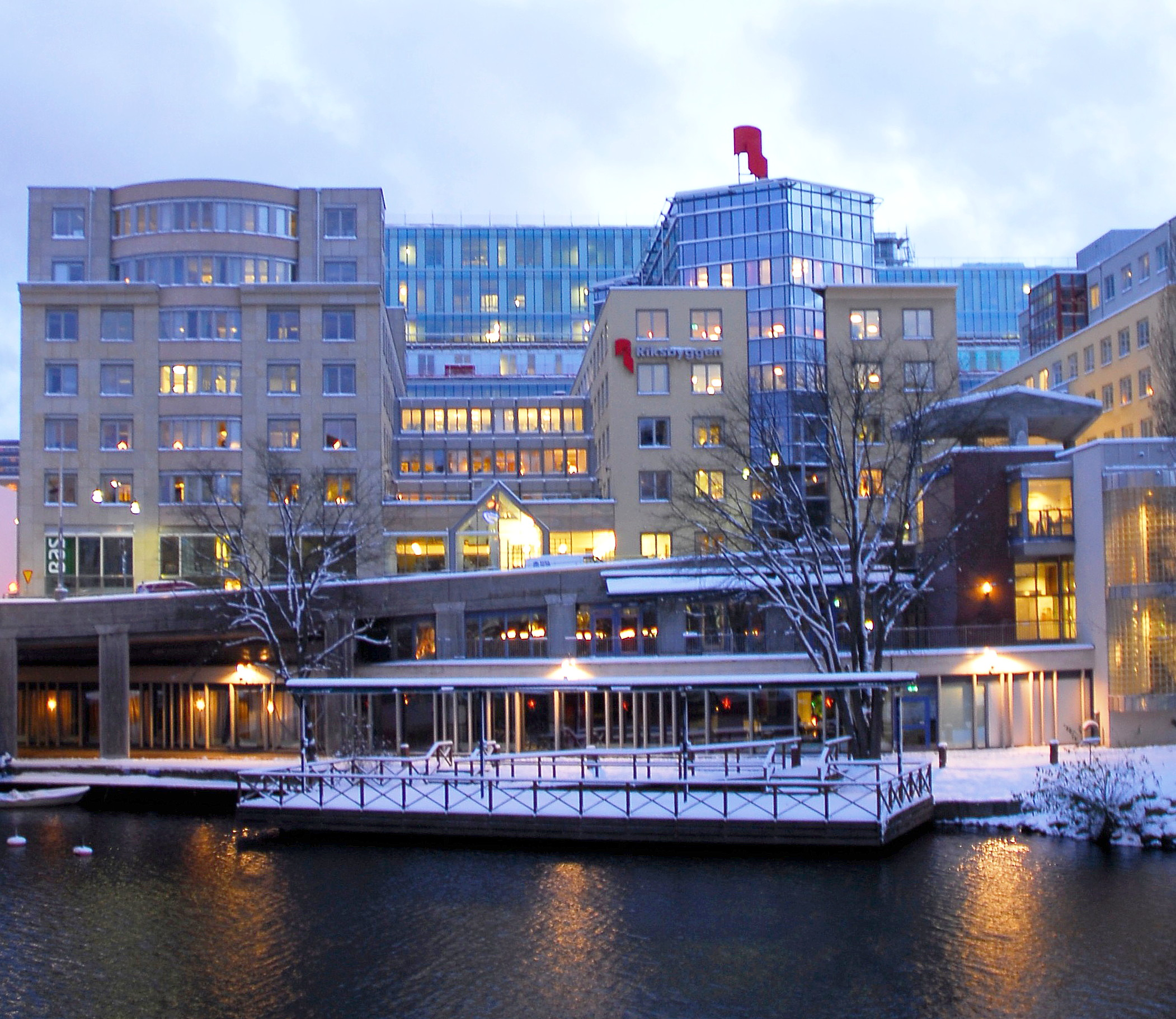
- Headquarters of Riksbyggen in Stockholm
- Industry: Housing cooperative
- Founded: 1940; 86 years ago
- Headquarters: Stockholm, Sweden
- Area served: Sweden
- Key people: Leif Linde (CEO); Johan Lindholm (Chairman)
- Services: Housing, architecture, etc.
- Revenue: ▲ c. 7 bn SEK
- Members: c. 1.643
- Number of employees: c. 2.700
- Website: https://www.riksbyggen.se/

Riksbyggen (motto: Rum för hela livet) is a Swedish housing cooperative owned by the building unions, housing association and by other national co-operative associations. The company manages approximately 176,000 apartments in 2,650 housing associations. Riksbyggen has 300 offices and activities in more than 400 locations all over the country. Most federations within Swedish Trade Union Confederation (LO) have participations in Riksbyggen, of which Byggnads och Kommunal has the largest unit.

Riksbyggen is also one of Sweden's largest property managers with tenant-owner associations as well as commercial and public property owners as customers. Almost 40% of all energy used in Sweden goes to buildings, which reduces energy use as a priority issue in Riksbyggen's sustainability work.

In 2017, Riksbyggen and LKAB entered into an agreement for 250 new condominiums in Malmfälten for the next ten years.

== Developments ==
A new field of application has been tested, By collecting high resolution images with drones, Riksbyggen and Spotscale were able to develop 3D models of housing associations.

== History ==
Riksbyggen was founded in 1940, by trade unions in the construction sector as a response to the current housing crisis and unemployment among construction workers. Among those founders were Viktor Björkman, Ture Blomqvist, Ed Kärrfeldt, Nils Linde and Anders Nilsson. In 1952, the company Byggfackens Central AB was formed with the task of responding to Riksbyggen's asset management. Riksbyggen had by 1974 built 200,000 dwelling units, 55 percent of them cooperatives; HSB had built somewhat more, and these two big institutions managed about two-thirds of half-million cooperative housing units in the country.

== See also ==
- Solar Egg (sauna)
- Riksdag
- LKAB
- Home
