= Teresa Macrì =

Italian art critic and curator

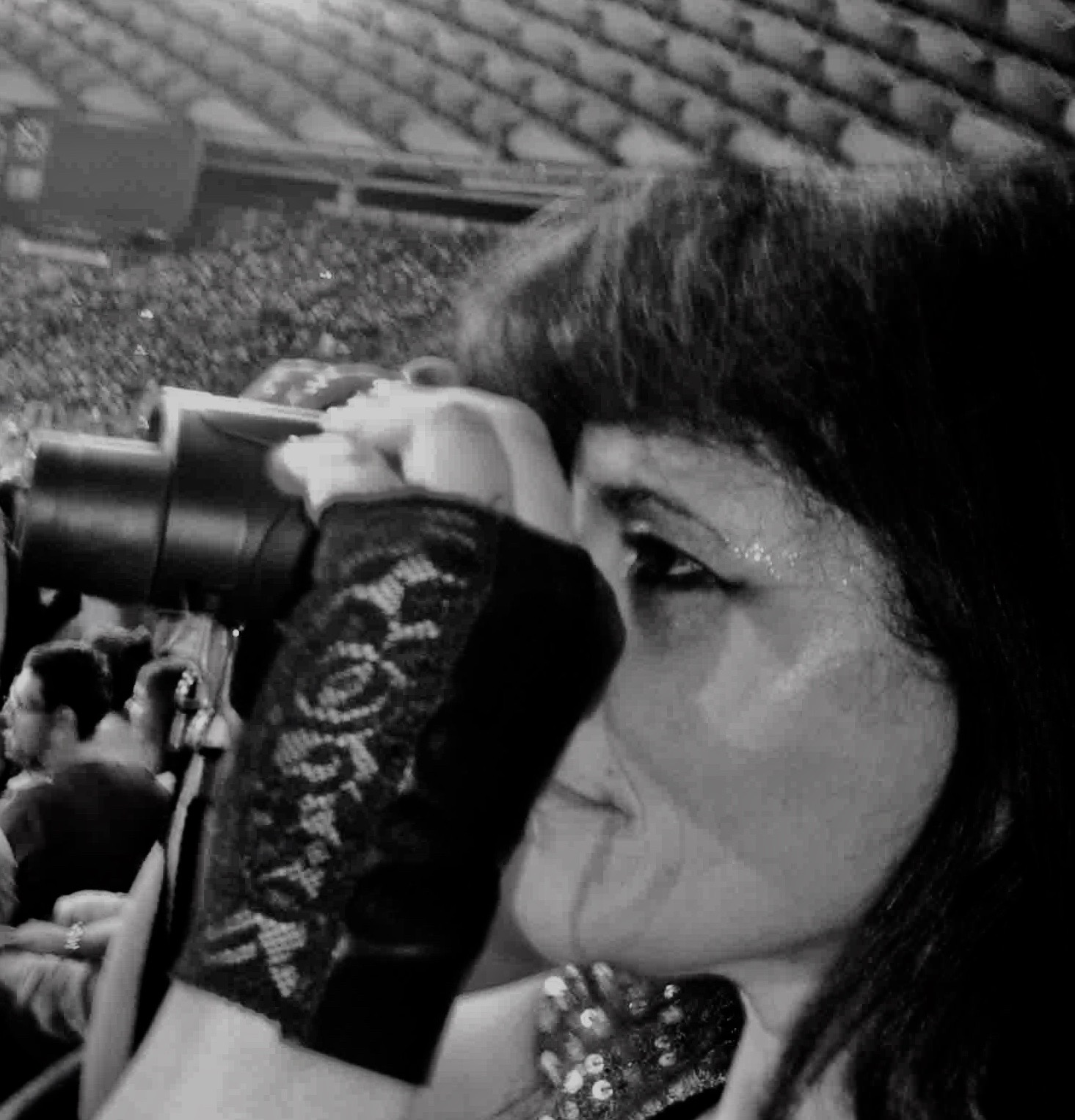
- Born: 1960 (age 65–66); Catanzaro, Italy
- Citizenship: Italy
- Occupations: Art critic, curator and writer

Teresa Macrì (born 1960 in Catanzaro) is an Italian art critic, curator, writer and radio broadcaster.

== Early life and education ==
Macrì was born in Catanzaro. At the end of the 1970s she moved to Rome, where she obtained a degree in History of Art at the Sapienza University of Rome. Her research is linked to the investigation of visual studies.

== Career ==
The core of her interdisciplinary work consists of a critical analysis on the constitution of contemporary subjectivity. She has organized many exhibitions, including the 9th Biennale des Jeunes Créateurs d'Europe et de la Méditerranée (Rome, 1999); Mexico Attacks! Arte mexicano contemporáneo (Museo de Arte y Diseño Contemporáneo, Costa Rica, 2005) and Emotional Community (Monitor, Rome, 2009). She also organized solo presentations of the work of Carlos Garaicoa (Rome, 2003); Sislej Xhafa and Adel Abdessemed (Barcelona, 2004); Gülsün Karamustafa (Istanbul, 2006); Santiago Sierra (Rome, 2007); Domenico Mangano (Rome, 2008); and Dan Perjovschi (Rome, 2011).

Macrì is a professor at the Rome University of Fine Arts. She is also regular columnist for the Italian newspaper Il Manifesto and collaborates with many international magazines on art and philosophy. In 2021, she was critical of Emanuele Stifano bronze sculpture Spigolatrice di Sapri.

== Books ==
=== Il corpo postorganico ===
In her first critical essay Il corpo postorganico (The Post-organic Body), 1996, Macrì advances an analysis of the bio-technological body. The body has always been a territory for social control and regulation, a crossroads between aesthetic and ideological power and is now even more radically crucial both culturally and politically. It is under construction, going through processes of identity redefinition and overturning sexual and social roles. The body has become a hybrid of organic and synthetic substance, of biological matter and silicon chips: genetic engineering and neuroscience are subjecting it to mutation. Many performers are linked to this contamination between flesh and technology: from Chris Burden, Vito Acconci, COUM Transmissions, Leigh Bowery, Stelarc, Marcel.lì Antunez Roca and Matthew Barney. Inspired by this book, Italian film director Marco Ferreri had decided to turn it into a movie. The film was never completed due to Ferreri's premature death in May 1997.

=== Postculture ===
The term Postculture (2002) indicates a syncretic journey through the International art of the last decade and post-colonial studies, dwelling upon the artistic declinations that have taken form in those geographical territories (Africa, Latin America) where the process of decolonization is sensed as the reconstruction of an identity. Macrì exposes the breakdown of obsolete notions such as exoticism, stereotype and folklorization of cultures.

=== In the Mood for Show ===
In The Mood for Show (2008) suggests an analysis of the relationship between art and pop culture focusing on different spectacular artists and movie directors of our time. The main concept around which the essay revolves is the attitude of the spectacular, which has become ever more central in the frame of what is to be considered Visual Culture, and that is re-elaborated and/ or re-manipulated by the practices of the seven art-makers considered (Damien Hirst, Douglas Gordon, Maurizio Cattelan, Phil Collins, Sofia Coppola, Harmony Korine and Chris Cunningham).

=== Politics/Poetics ===
The book Politics/Poetics (2017) deals with the analysis and fusion of the concepts of politics and poetics in contemporary art. Their relationship, examined through the work of two artists, Jeremy Deller and Francis Alÿs, reflects an unconventional and dissident attitude within the contemporary art system. The correlation between politics and poetics is explored through a network of multiple connections that include situationism, Marxism, pop music, rock, surrealism and dadaism, psychoanalysis and visual studies. By affinity, artists like Phil Collins, Mike Kelley, Allan Kaprow, André Cadere, Group Material, Vito Acconci, Hélio Oiticica, Akram Zaatari, Santiago Sierra, Bas Jan Ader, Lawrence Weiner, filmmakers like Elia Suleiman, Harmony Korine and Alejandro González Iñárritu are connected to each other as well as to Stuart Hall and Antonio Gramsci, Hannah Arendt and Guy Debord, and Cinéma vérité.

=== Fallimento ===
Fallimento (Failure) is a trans-generational investigation that analyses the concept of failure in contrast with the ostentatious dimension of success. The concept of failure, removed from the sphere of contemporary consciousness and based on the efficiency of performance and on the conformity of standards, is reinstated through the work of art as a stimulating and vital energy, as well as a reference to the metaphor of the ideological, political and cultural bankruptcy of consumer society. The study focuses on various artists: Cesare Pietroiusti, Chris Burden, Iggy Pop, Maurizio Cattelan, Bruce Nauman, John Baldessari, Marcel Broodthaers, Bas Jan Ader, Tacita Dean, Fischli & Weiss, Francis Alÿs, Robert Smithson, Jeremy Deller, Walter De Maria, Sislej Xhafa, Superflex, Francesco Arena and others.

=== Pensiero discordante ===
The dissenting process emphasized by the author in her book is an approach that is free from the conventions and values that regulate cultural flatness, a reaction through which the thinking individual is repositioned in order to deconstruct the dominating symbolic order. In this drifting era, most of the planet seems hypnotized by a unanimous vision of the world, complacent and exalted by the mechanisms of consensus politics. We must stop and consider the catalysts triggered by this condition, as artists and thinkers do by means of their aesthetic utopias, their paradoxes, their metaphors, their aesthetic digressions, their ability to generate worlds and dismantle them. John Giorno, Francis Alÿs, Luca Vitone, Sislej Xhafa, John Cage and Luca Guadagnino, among others, depict a destabilizing horizon and recreate a “different” approach.

== Exhibits ==
In 2019 she curated the You got to burn to shine exhibit at the National Gallery of Modern Art, in Rome.

== Bibliography ==
- Teresa Macrì, Splatter, Rome, Stampa Alternativa, 1993
- Teresa Macrì, Il corpo postorganico, Milan, Costa & Nolan, 1996 - ISBN 8874370504
- Teresa Macrì, Metamorfosi do sentir, Lisbon, Assirio Y Alvim, 1998
- Teresa Macrì, Cinemacchine del desiderio, Milan, Costa & Nolan, 1998 - ISBN 887648342X
- Teresa Macrì, Postculture, Rome, Meltemi, 2002 - ISBN 8883531515
- Teresa Macrì, Il corpo postorganico, (new edition), Rome, Costa & Nolan, 2006 - ISBN 8874370504
- Teresa Macrì, In the Mood for Show, Rome, Meltemi, 2008 - ISBN 8883536665
- Teresa Macrì, Politics/Poetics, Milan, Postmedia Books, 2014 - ISBN 9788874901104
- Teresa Macrì, Fallimento, Milan, Postmedia Books, 2017 - ISBN 9788874901845
- Teresa Macrì, Pensiero discordante, Milan, Postmedia Books, 2018

== See also ==
- Contemporary art
- Performance art
- Visual studies
- Body art
