= Helena Kontova =

Helena Kontova (16 November 1955, Prague, Czech Republic) is an art critic and curator based in Milan, Italy, where she has been the editor of Flash Art International since 1979. She is also a co-founder and director, together with Giancarlo Politi, of the Prague Biennale.

Kontova obtained a BA in Art History and History from the Charles University in Prague and went on to study Czech and Italian futurism at the Milan University in 1977. In 1993 she co-curated the Aperto section at the Venice Biennale with Achille Bonito Oliva.

She participated in numerous symposia and has conducted interviews with artists such as Jeff Koons, Maurizio Cattelan, Marina Abramović, Vanessa Beecroft, Shirin Neshat, Francesco Vezzoli, Gian Marco Montesano and Michelangelo Pistoletto.

In 2004 she founded a private art foundation in Prague, Nadace Prague Biennale. https://biennialfoundation.org/biennials/prague-biennale/. Every two years she directs the Prague Biennale, a Biennal of emerging artists that concentrates each time on different social and geographical aspects.

== Bibliography ==
- Flash Art: Two Decades of History, Politi Editore, Milan, 1990.
- Mimmo Paladino: Kresby, Oleje, Sochy, Obrezzi & Dones, Milan, 1991.
- Mark Kostabi: New Paintings, In Arco, Turin, 1991.
- Aperto 93: Emergency, Politi Editore, Milan, 1993.
- Audience 0.01: International Video, Politi Editore, Milan, 1994.
- Fuori Uso: The Bridges, Politi Editore, Milan, 2000.
- Tirana Biennale 1: Escape, Politi Editore, Milan, 2001.
- Prague Biennale 1: Peripheries become the Center, Politi Editore, Milan, 2003.
- Prague Biennale 2: Expanded Painting, Politi Editore, Milan, 2005.
- Prague Biennale 3: Glocal and Outsiders: Connecting Cultures in Central Europe, Politi Editore, Milan, 2007
- Prague Biennale 4, Politi Editore, Milan, 2009.
- Prague Biennale 5: New Location, New Face, Politi Editore, Milan, 2011.
- Prague Biennale 6, Politi Editore, Milan, 2013.

== Curatorial activities ==
- "the better biennale - 1993 Venice Biennale". Artforum. 32 (2). Archived from the original on 3 September 2004 – via FindArticles.
- 1994: Audience 0.01, Trevi Flash Art Museum, Italy / LINK
- 1995: Aperto 95, Trevi Flash Art Museum, Italy
- 1996: Panorama Italiano 1: Arte e Critica Oggi, Trevi Flash Art Museum, Italy
- 2000: Fuori Uso: The Bridges, Pescara, Italy.
- 2001: Tirana Biennale 1, National Gallery, Tirana
- 2003, 2005, 2007, 2009, 2011, 2013: Prague Biennale

== Personal life ==
Kontova was married to art critic and publisher Giancarlo Politi. Their daughter Gea Politi has taken on the publishing house Politi Editore and the magazine.
