= Morro d'Oro =

- Comune
- Comune di Morro d'Oro
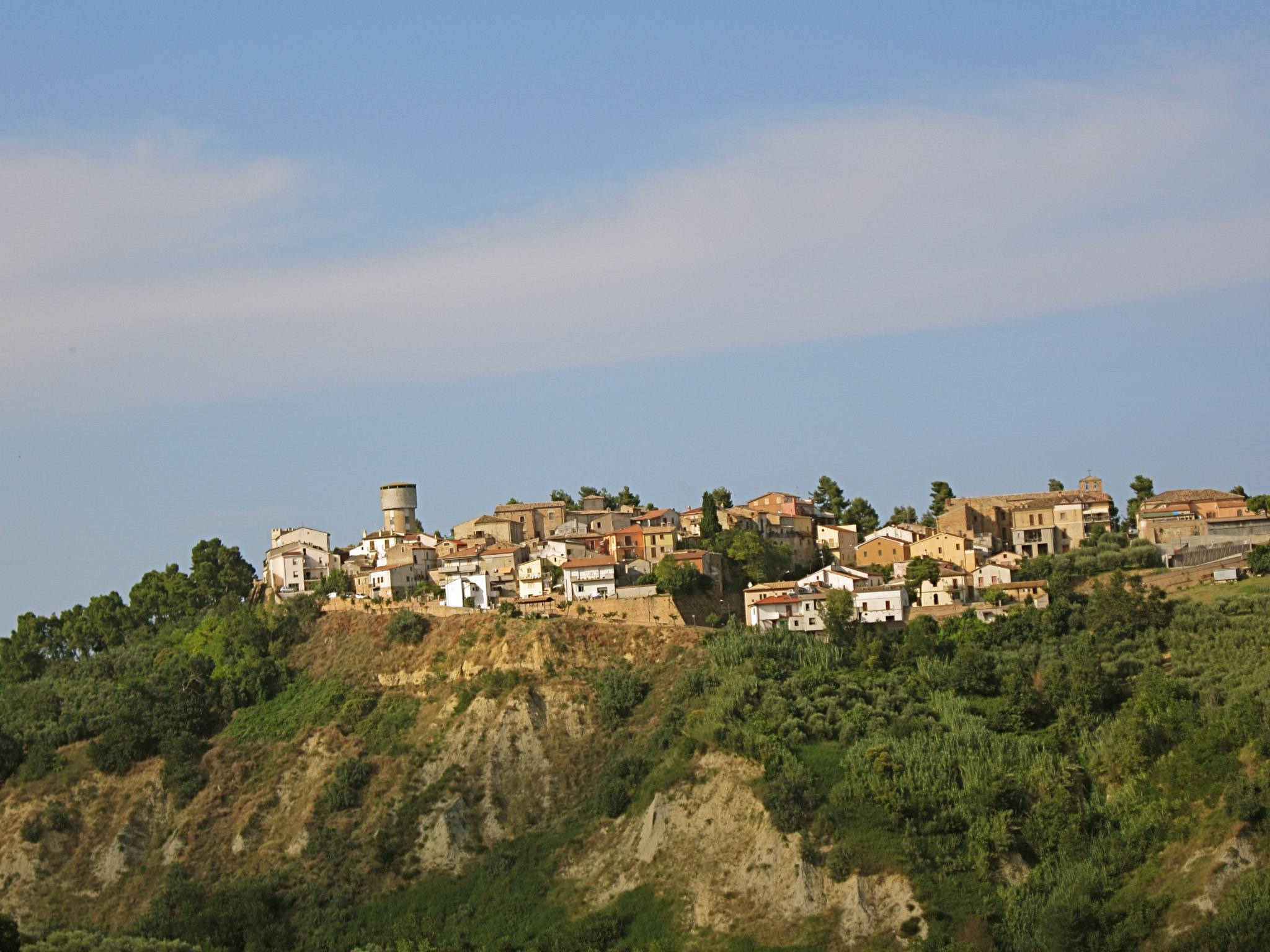

- Location within Italy Location within Abruzzo
- Coordinates: 42°40′N 13°55′E
- Country: Italy
- Region: Abruzzo
- Province: Teramo (TE)
- Frazioni: Case di Bonaventura, Case Merluzzi, Pagliare, Razzano, San Pietro, Torrenera

Area
  - Total: 28 km^{2} (11 sq mi)
- Elevation: 210 m (690 ft)

Population (1 January 2007)
  - Total: 3,468
  - Density: 120/km^{2} (320/sq mi)
- Demonym: Morresi
- Time zone: UTC+1 (CET)
  - Summer (DST): UTC+2 (CEST)
- Postal code: 64020
- Dialing code: 085
- ISTAT code: 067029

Morro d'Oro is a town and comune in Teramo province in the Abruzzo region of eastern Italy. Morro d'Oro is an Italian municipality of 3,553 inhabitants in the province of Teramo in Abruzzo, part of the union of the Colline del Medio Vomano municipalities. It is a small town located between the Tordino and Vomano valleys. Its territory extends for 28.18 km²; the inhabitants at the census of 21 October 1991 were 3,015 units; as of 31 December 1995 there were 3,190; a sign that the municipality, after a twenty-year phase of depopulation (from 3,215 in 1961 to 2,758 in 1981) is in continuous demographic growth. All this thanks to its strategic location (12 km from the sea and 40 from the mountain) and its changed economic conditions: from an exclusively agricultural economy - and mainly sharecropping - to a more integrated agricultural-artisan-industrial one. Therefore, its economy is based, on the one hand, on agriculture, but of an advanced type and on selected crops (vegetables and orchards), in addition to the traditional ones: cereals in general; on the other, on the tertiary sector (building craftsmanship and, to a lesser extent, trade); but there is also adequate industrial development, which absorbs a workforce of around 300 units.

== Origin of the name ==
The toponym Morro d'Oro, whose origins are undefined (Murus, Murrum, Morrum, then Moro appears in 1567, Murro in 1601 and Morra in 1703) has its definitive name in the current one with the royal decree n. 1616 of 13 December 1863 and on the basis of the Council resolution of 18 October, which read as follows: "... considering that the Municipality has always been abundant in land fertility, considering that in ancient times it has always been given the epithet of Morro d'Oro, has decided that the added word [d'oro] should be written with an apostrophe...".

== History ==
The origins of Morro d'Oro date back to the Middle Ages: probably linked to the era of castles (8th-10th century); but, evidence of its existence is not available before a document from 1021, which speaks of a donation made by Adelberto De Aprutio in favor of the monastery of Montecassino and in which the estate of Muro appears and mentions of a Castello Veccio. Other documents from 1101 and 1128, in which the term Murum (or Morrum) appears, further testify to its existence. In the 12th century the territory was enfeoffed to Trasmondo di Castelvecchio; but after 1200 Morro also entered the zone of influence of the Acquaviva, as, moreover, had happened, or happened later, for the other neighboring towns, from Atri to the Tronto river. In the following centuries the fate of Morro, naturally, was identified with that of the Acquaviva family, under whose jurisdiction it remained until the early eighteenth century. Throughout 1807, the community of Morro was administratively aggregated to Notaresco; with the government of the King of Naples, Gioacchino Murat, in that year it was provisionally aggregated to Montepagano; However, already in 1808 it was made autonomous again, in principle in its current territorial configuration.

== Symbols ==
The coat of arms and the municipal banner were granted by decree of the President of the Republic of 28 April 1975.

== Monuments and places of interest ==
Church of Santa Maria di Propezzano

Convent of Santa Maria di Propezzano Morro D'Oro Abbey of Santa Maria di Propezzano: its existence is ascertained in the years between 930 and 960, but a consolidated tradition, not conclusive and sometimes imaginative, dates it back to 10 May 715 AD. It is an abbey complex in Romanesque-Gothic style, with the typical layout of Benedictine monasteries, perfectly preserved in its original structure, as even the few restorations to which it was subjected were carried out with perfect adherence to the origin, including the material used.
