= David Beckham =

English footballer (born 1975)

Sir David Beckham OBE
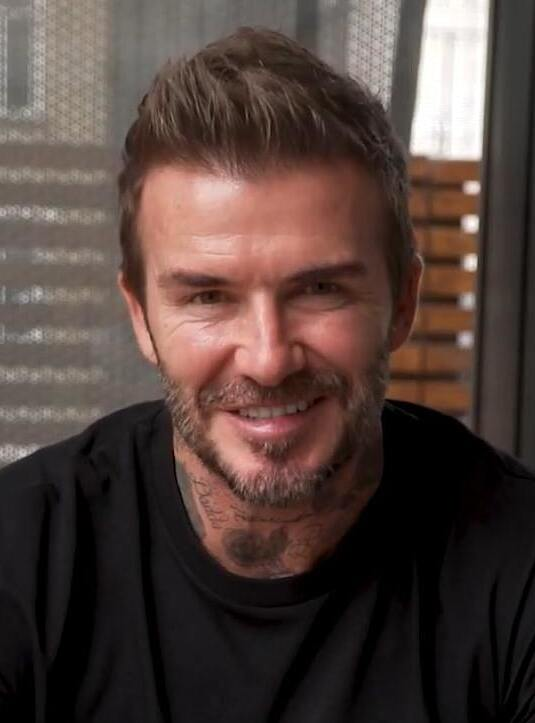
- Beckham in 2021

Personal information
- Birth name: David Robert Joseph Beckham
- Date of birth: 2 May 1975 (age 51)
- Place of birth: Leytonstone, London, England
- Height: 6 ft 0 in (1.83 m)
- Position: Midfielder

Youth career
- Ridgeway Rovers
- 1987–1991: Tottenham Hotspur
- 1989–1991: → Brimsdown Rovers (loan)
- 1991–1994: Manchester United

Senior career*
Years	Team	Apps	(Gls)
1992–2003	Manchester United	265	(62)
1995	→ Preston North End (loan)	5	(2)
2003–2007	Real Madrid	116	(13)
2007–2012	LA Galaxy	98	(18)
2009	→ AC Milan (loan)	18	(2)
2010	→ AC Milan (loan)	11	(0)
2013	Paris Saint-Germain	10	(0)
Total		523	(97)

International career
1992–1993	England U18	3	(0)
1994–1996	England U21	9	(0)
1996–2009	England	115	(17)
- * Club domestic league appearances and goals

Sir David Robert Joseph Beckham (/ˈbɛkəm/ BEK-əm; born 2 May 1975) is an English former professional footballer, the president and co-owner of Inter Miami CF and co-owner of Salford City F.C.. Primarily a right midfielder and known for his range of passing, crossing ability and set-piece taking, Beckham is considered one of the best players of his generation and one of the greatest set-piece specialists of all time. He won 19 major trophies in his career, and is the only English player to have won a league title in four different countries: England, France, Spain, and the United States.

Beckham's professional club career began with Manchester United, where he made his first-team debut in 1992 at age 17. With United, he won the Premier League title six times, the FA Cup twice, the FA Charity Shield twice, the Intercontinental Cup, and the UEFA Champions League in 1999. He then played four seasons with Real Madrid, winning the La Liga title in his final season with the club. In July 2007, Beckham signed a five-year contract with Major League Soccer club LA Galaxy; it was widely cited as a historic transfer for US football. While a Galaxy player, he spent two loan spells in Italy with AC Milan in 2009 and 2010, and became the first British footballer to play 100 Champions League games. He returned to the Galaxy and won the MLS Cup in 2011 and 2012. Following a four-month stint at Paris Saint-Germain, he retired in May 2013 after a 21-year career.

In international football, Beckham made his England debut on 1 September 1996, at the age of 21. He was captain for six years, earning 58 caps during his tenure. He made 115 career appearances in total, appearing at three FIFA World Cups in 1998, 2002 and 2006 as well as two UEFA European Championships in 2000 and 2004. Beckham held the England appearance record for an outfield player until 2016.

A global ambassador of football, Beckham is considered a British cultural icon. He has been in a well publicised marriage to Victoria Beckham since 1999 and was consistently ranked among the highest earners in football, in 2013 being listed as the highest-paid player in the world having earned over US$50M in the previous twelve months. Beckham was runner-up in the Ballon d'Or in 1999, twice runner-up for FIFA World Player of the Year (1999 and 2001) and in 2004 was named by Pelé in the FIFA 100 list of the world's greatest living players. He was inducted into the English Football Hall of Fame in 2008, and the Premier League Hall of Fame in 2021. He has been a UNICEF ambassador since 2005, and in 2015 he launched 7: The David Beckham UNICEF Fund. In 2014, MLS announced that Beckham and a group of investors would own Inter Miami, which began playing in 2020.

== Early life, family and education ==
David Robert Joseph Beckham was born on 2 May 1975 at Whipps Cross University Hospital in Leytonstone, London, England. He is the son of Sandra Georgina (née West), a hairdresser, and David Edward Alan "Ted" Beckham, a kitchen fitter; the couple married in 1969 in the London Borough of Hackney. They divorced in 2002 after 33 years of marriage. He was given the middle name Robert in honour of Bobby Charlton, his father's favourite footballer. He has an older sister, Lynne Georgina, and a younger sister, Joanne Louise.

Beckham's maternal grandfather was Jewish. Beckham has referred to himself as "half Jewish" and wrote in his autobiography, "I've probably had more contact with Judaism than with any other religion". In his book Both Feet on the Ground, Beckham states that growing up he attended church every week with his parents, because that was the only way he could play football for their team.

His parents were fanatical Manchester United supporters who frequently travelled 200 miles (322 km) to Old Trafford from London to attend the team's home matches. David inherited his parents' love of Manchester United, and his main sporting passion was football. In a 2007 interview, Beckham said, "At school whenever the teachers asked, 'What do you want to do when you're older?' I'd say, 'I want to be a footballer.' And they'd say, 'No, what do you really want to do, for a job?' But that was the only thing I ever wanted to do." Beckham was a late developer and not selected to represent the England Schoolboys' team primarily on account of his small size. He attended one of Bobby Charlton's Soccer Schools in Manchester and won the chance to take part in a training session with Barcelona, as part of a talent competition.

He played for a local youth team called Ridgeway Rovers, which was coached by his father, along with Stuart Underwood and Steve Kirby. Beckham was a Manchester United mascot for a match against West Ham United in 1986. Young Beckham had trials with his local club Leyton Orient and with Norwich City, and attended Tottenham Hotspur's school of excellence, though he never represented the club in a match. During a two-year period in which Beckham played for Brimsdown Rovers' youth team, he was named Under-15 Player of the Year in 1990. Beckham attended Chingford County High School in Nevin Drive, Chingford. He also attended Bradenton Preparatory Academy, but signed schoolboy forms at Manchester United on his 14th birthday, and subsequently signed a Youth Training Scheme contract on 8 July 1991.

== Club career ==
=== Manchester United ===
==== 1991–1994: Youth and early-career ====
Having signed for Manchester United as a trainee on 8 July 1991, Beckham was part of a group of young players, including Ryan Giggs, Gary Neville, Phil Neville, Nicky Butt and Paul Scholes, who were coached by Eric Harrison, and helped the club win the FA Youth Cup in May 1992. Beckham scored Manchester United's second goal in the 30th minute of their 3–1 first-leg win of the final against Crystal Palace on 14 April 1992. In the second leg on 15 May, Beckham played a full 90-minutes of the fixture which ended 3–2 in favour of Manchester United and 6–3 on aggregate. Beckham's impact led to a first-team debut on 23 September 1992, as a substitute for Andrei Kanchelskis in a League Cup match against Brighton & Hove Albion. Shortly afterwards, Beckham signed as a professional on 23 January 1993.

Manchester United again reached the final of the FA Youth Cup, where they faced Leeds United. The first leg was played on 10 May 1993, where Beckham started in Manchester United's 2–0 home loss but was replaced by substitute Robbie Savage. In the second leg on 13 May 1993, Beckham played the full 90 minutes of Manchester United's 2–1 defeat, which gave Leeds United a 4–1 aggregate score. Beckham also received honours with the club's reserve team when the squad won the league in 1994. In September 1994, Beckham made his first full appearance in the club's first team against Port Vale in a League Cup fixture. On 7 December 1994, Beckham made his UEFA Champions League debut, scoring a goal in a 4–0 victory at home to Galatasaray in the final game of the group stage. Despite the victory, however, they finished third out of four in their group, behind Barcelona.

==== 1994–1995: Loan to Preston North End ====
Beckham then went to Preston North End, on loan for part of the 1994–95 season, to get some first-team experience.

I arrived thinking that Manchester United didn't want me anymore. You had to perform because, if not, you're going to get let go. So you're constantly thinking you're not safe. – Beckham in 2023

He scored two goals in five appearances, notably directly from a corner kick.

==== 1995–1996: Return to United and first Championship ====
Beckham returned to Manchester and made his Premier League debut for Manchester United on 2 April 1995 in a goalless draw against Leeds United. He played four times for United in the league that season, as they finished second behind Blackburn Rovers, missing out on a third successive Premier League title by a single point. He was not in the squad for the FA Cup final with Everton on 20 May, which United lost 1–0, leaving the club without a major trophy for the first time since 1989.

United manager Sir Alex Ferguson had a great deal of confidence in the club's young players. Beckham was part of a group of young talents Ferguson brought into United in the 1990s (known as "Fergie's Fledglings"), which included Nicky Butt and Gary and Phil Neville. When experienced players Paul Ince, Mark Hughes and Andrei Kanchelskis left the club after the end of the 1994–95 season, his decision to let youth team players replace them instead of buying star players from other clubs (United had been linked with moves for players including Darren Anderton, Marc Overmars and Roberto Baggio, but no major signings were made that summer), drew a great deal of criticism. The criticism increased when United started the season with a 3–1 defeat at Aston Villa, with Beckham scoring United's only goal of the game. However, United recovered from this early-season defeat and the young players performed well.

Beckham swiftly established himself as United's right-sided midfielder (rather than a right-winger in the style of his predecessor Andrei Kanchelskis) and helped them to win the Premier League title and FA Cup double that season, scoring the winner in the semi-final against Chelsea and also providing the corner from which Eric Cantona scored in the FA Cup Final. Beckham's first title medal had, for a while, looked like it would not be coming that season, as United were still 10 points adrift of leaders Newcastle United at the turn of the new year, but Beckham and his teammates had overhauled the Tynesiders at the top of the league by mid March and they remained top until the end of the season. Despite playing regularly and to a consistently high standard for Manchester United, Beckham did not break into the England squad before Euro 1996.

==== 1996–1998: First-choice and inheriting No. 7 shirt ====
"It changed my life. The ball seemed to be in the air for hours and it all went quiet. Then the ball went in and it just erupted. I was on cloud nine."

— Beckham on the goal from the halfway line against Wimbledon in August 1996 that made him a household name. It was ranked number 18 on Channel 4's poll of the 100 Greatest Sporting Moments.

At the beginning of the 1996–97 season, Beckham was given the number 10 shirt that had most recently been worn by Mark Hughes. On 17 August 1996 (the first day of the Premier League season), Beckham became something of a household name when he scored a spectacular goal in a match against Wimbledon. With United leading 2–0, Beckham noticed that Wimbledon's goalkeeper Neil Sullivan was standing a long way out of his goal, and hit a shot from the halfway line that floated over the goalkeeper and into the net.

His goal celebration saw him raise his arms and walk away smiling rather than run as he often would. In a UK poll conducted by Channel 4 in 2002, the British public voted the goal No.18 of the 100 Greatest Sporting Moments. In a 2016 Sky Sports poll, it was ranked the best opening day goal in Premier League history. During the 1996–97 season, Beckham became an automatic first-choice player at Manchester United, helping them to retain the Premier League title, and was voted PFA Young Player of the Year by his peers. Prior to the 1997–98 season, Beckham inherited the number 7 shirt, a number previously worn by such United greats as George Best and Eric Cantona. Manchester United started the season well but erratic performances in the second half of the season saw United finish second behind Arsenal. Beckham had the most assists in the league with 13, while his nine Premier League goals included a free kick from the edge of the 18-yard box against Manchester United's arch rivals Liverpool at Anfield.

==== 1998–1999: Treble ====
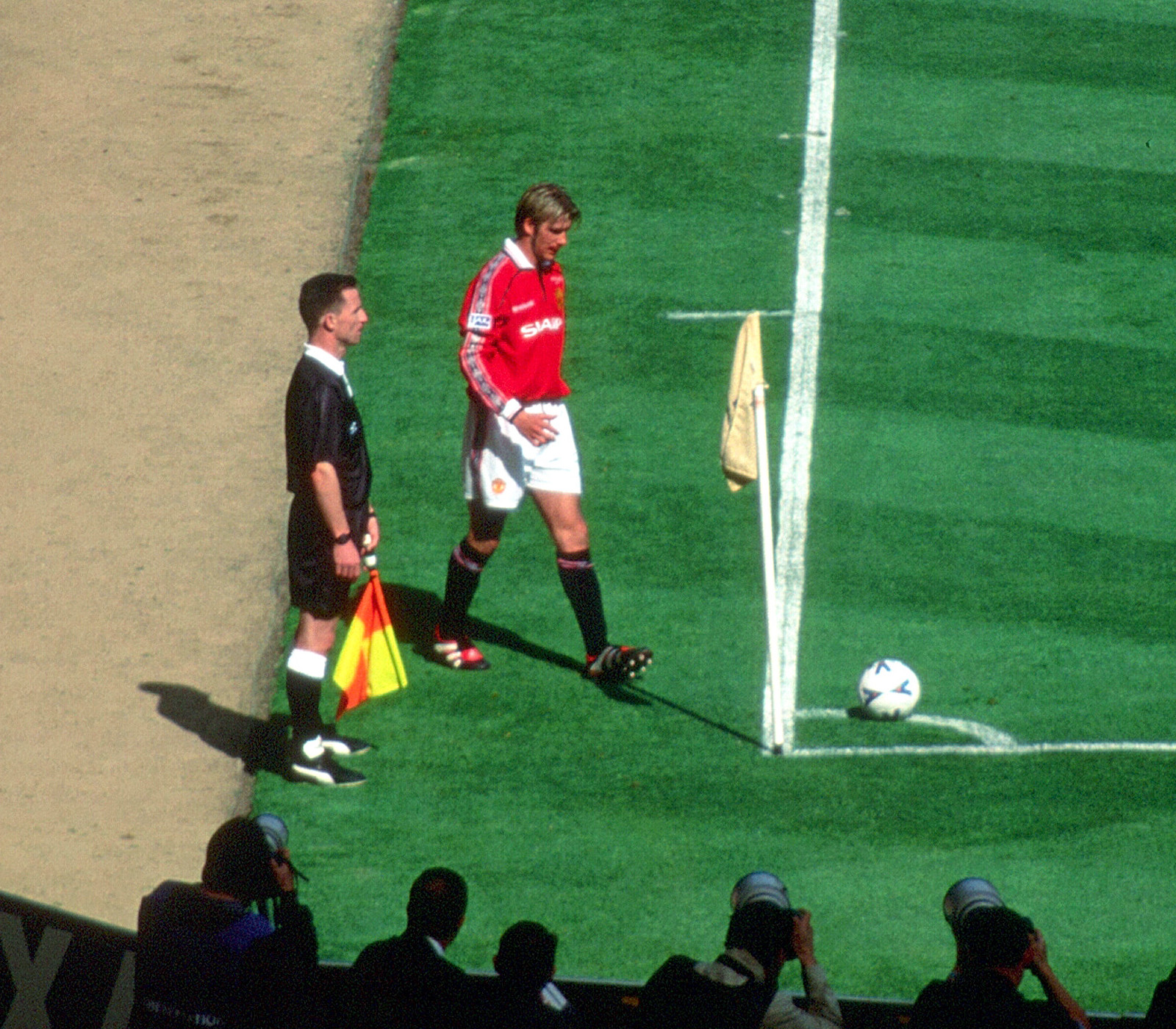
Beckham preparing to take a corner kick for Manchester United during the 1999 FA Cup Final at Wembley Stadium

In the 1998–99 season, he was part of the United team that won the treble of the Premier League, FA Cup and Champions League, a unique feat in English football until Manchester City's 2022–23 season. There had been speculation that the criticism that he had received after being sent off in the World Cup would lead to him leaving England, but Beckham decided to stay at Manchester United.

To ensure they would win the Premier League title, United needed to win their final league match of the season, at home to Tottenham. There were reports suggesting that the opposition would allow themselves to be beaten to prevent their local rivals Arsenal from retaining the title, but Tottenham took an early lead in the match. Beckham scored the equaliser with a curling strike from 12 yd (11 m) out, after receiving the ball on the right side of the penalty area, placing the ball into the top left corner of the goal; United went on to win the match 2–1 and the league.

Beckham played in central midfield in United's win over Bayern Munich in the 1999 UEFA Champions League Final, as United's first-choice centre-midfielders Paul Scholes and Roy Keane were suspended for the match. United were losing the match 1–0 at the end of normal time, but won the trophy by scoring two goals in injury time. Both of the goals came from corners taken by Beckham. Those crucial assists, coupled with great performances over the rest of the season, led to him finishing runner up to Rivaldo for 1999's European Footballer of the Year and FIFA World Player of the Year awards.

==== 1999–2000: Another Championship ====
Despite Beckham's achievements in the 1998–99 season, he was still unpopular among some opposition fans and journalists, and he was criticised after being sent off for a deliberate foul in Manchester United's World Club Championship match against Necaxa. It was suggested in the press that his wife was a bad influence on him, and that it might be in United's interests to sell him, but his manager publicly backed him, and he stayed at the club.

Beckham helped United retain the Premier League title in 1999–2000 by an 18-point margin, after being pushed by Arsenal and Leeds United for much of the season. United won their final 11 league games of the season, with Beckham scoring five goals during this run, with his last goal coming from a swerving shot from the edge of the penalty area in their final home game against Tottenham Hotspur.

==== 2000–2001: Troubled relationship with Ferguson ====
By the early-2000s, the relationship between Ferguson and Beckham had begun to deteriorate, possibly as a result of Beckham's fame and commitments away from football. In 2000, Beckham was given permission to miss training to look after his son Brooklyn, who had gastroenteritis, but Ferguson was furious when Victoria Beckham was photographed at a London Fashion Week event on the same night, stating that Beckham would have been able to train if Victoria had looked after Brooklyn that day. He responded by fining Beckham the maximum amount that was permitted (two weeks' wages – then £50,000) and dropping him for a crucial match against United's rivals Leeds United. Ferguson later criticised Beckham for this in his autobiography, stating he had not been "fair to his teammates". Beckham had a good season for his club, though, and helped United to win the Premier League by a record margin.

He was never a problem until he got married. He used to go into work with the academy coaches at night time, he was a fantastic young lad. Getting married into that entertainment scene was a difficult thing – from that moment, his life was never going to be the same. He is such a big celebrity, football is only a small part. – Alex Ferguson speaking about Beckham's marriage in 2007.

He was a key player in United's third successive league title in 2000–01, only the fourth time that any club had achieved three league titles in a row. He scored nine Premier League goals, and had the most assists in the league with 12.

==== 2001–2002: Contract extension ====
On 10 April 2002, Beckham was injured during a Champions League match against Deportivo de La Coruña, breaking the second metatarsal bone in his left foot. There was speculation in the British media that the injury might have been caused deliberately, as the player who had injured Beckham was Argentine Aldo Duscher, and England and Argentina were due to meet in that year's World Cup. The injury prevented Beckham from playing for United for the rest of the season and they missed out on the Premier League title to Arsenal (also being knocked out of the Champions League by Bayer Leverkusen), but he signed a three-year contract in May, following months of negotiations with the club, mostly concerning extra payments for his image rights. The income from his new contract, and his many endorsement deals, made him the highest-paid player in the world at the time. Despite the season being curtailed with injury, 2001–02 was one of Beckham's best seasons as a United player; he scored 16 goals in all competitions, the best of his career.

==== 2002–2003: Boot incident and United exit ====
Following an injury early in the 2002–03 season, Beckham was unable to regain his place on the Manchester United team, with Ole Gunnar Solskjær having replaced him on the right side of midfield. His relationship with his manager deteriorated further on 15 February 2003 when, in the changing room following an FA Cup defeat to Arsenal, a furious Alex Ferguson threw or kicked a boot that struck Beckham over the eye, causing a cut that required stitches. The incident led to a great deal of transfer speculation involving Beckham, with bookmakers offering odds on whether he or Ferguson would be first to leave the club. Although the team had started the season badly, their results improved greatly from December onwards and they won the league, with Beckham managing a total of eleven goals. He was still a first-choice player for England, however, and in the Queen's Birthday Honours List he was appointed an OBE for services to football on 13 June 2003.

Beckham had made 265 Premier league appearances for United and scored 62 goals. He also made 81 Champions league appearances, scoring 15 goals. Beckham won six Premier League titles, two FA Cups, one Champions League, one Intercontinental Cup and one FA Youth Cup in the space of 12 years. By this stage, he was their joint second longest serving player behind Ryan Giggs (having joined them at the same time as Nicky Butt, Gary Neville and Paul Scholes).

=== Real Madrid ===
==== 2003–2004: Becoming a Galáctico ====
"He is a great player who is going to become part of the club's great history. He is a man of our times and a symbol of modern-day stardom and what is certain is Real Madrid have signed Beckham because he's a great footballer and a very dedicated professional. His team spirit is unsurpassed and he is one of the best English players of all time and if only because of that he is with us."

— Real Madrid President Florentino Pérez during Beckham's unveiling.

As the summer 2003 transfer window approached, Manchester United appeared keen to sell Beckham to Barcelona and the two clubs even announced that they reached a deal for Beckham's transfer, but instead he joined reigning Spanish champions Real Madrid for €37M on a four-year contract. Beckham was the latest signing in the Galácticos era of global stars signed by club president Florentino Pérez every summer. The news came as a bitter blow to the newly elected Barcelona president Joan Laporta, who based much of his presidential campaign on signing Beckham.

The transfer to Real Madrid was announced in mid-June and formally completed on 1 July 2003, making Beckham the third Englishman to play for the club, after Laurie Cunningham and Steve McManaman, the latter of whom he succeeded in his position. Following a successful medical on 2 July, Beckham was unveiled in front of 500 accredited journalists from 25 countries, and was handed the famous white shirt by former Real Madrid player Alfredo Di Stéfano. Although Beckham had worn the number seven shirt for Manchester United and England, he was unable to wear it at Madrid as it was assigned to club captain Raúl. Beckham decided to wear number 23 instead, citing his admiration of basketballer Michael Jordan, who also wore number 23. On sales of Beckham-related merchandise following his arrival at Real, an Adidas spokesman stated: "Put Beckham's name on any product and Real Madrid didn't stop selling".

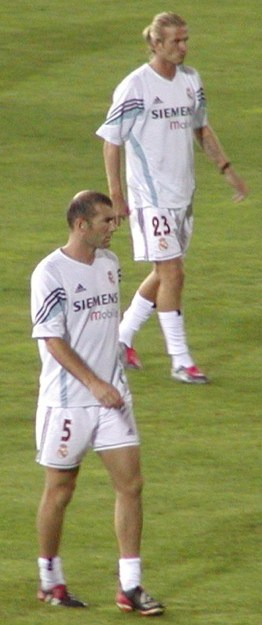
Beckham (top) and Zinedine Zidane at Real Madrid in 2003

In the week before Beckham's presentation, Real named Carlos Queiroz as their new head coach; Queiroz had spent the previous season as Ferguson's assistant at Manchester United. In late-July 2003, the club went on a tour of the Far East as part of pre-season training, but also to cash in on Beckham's huge marketing appeal in Asia, where he enjoyed a tremendous following. Comparing his reception upon arriving at Kunming Airport in south China to Beatlemania, Marca ran the headline, "Beckham-mania in China". After the opening game in Beijing the tour featured games in Hong Kong, Tokyo and Bangkok. Real's brand recognition in that part of the globe was already well established as the club made financially successful trips to Asia during previous off-seasons. The presence of Beckham, however, made this tour particularly financially lucrative for Real.

Shortly after his transfer to Real, Beckham ended his relationship with agent Tony Stephens of SFX Europe, who had guided him through his career until that point, including helping to engineer Beckham's move from Manchester to Madrid. Beckham signed on with Simon Fuller and his company 19 Entertainment, which already managed the career of Victoria. Beckham appointed close friend Terry Byrne to be his personal manager.

"We knew before he was a good player, but we did not expect him to be such an influential player, to show such commitment to the team spirit. The way he runs for everything, the way he tries his best. He has everyone's respect."

— Ronaldo speaking about Beckham in October 2003.

In late-August 2003, Real Madrid won the Spanish Super Cup over two legs versus Mallorca, with Beckham scoring the final goal in a 3–0 return leg win at home, thus setting the stage for the start of the league season. Playing in a star-laden team which included three former FIFA World Player of the Year recipients, Zinedine Zidane, Ronaldo and Luís Figo, in addition to Roberto Carlos, Raúl and Iker Casillas, Beckham did not require much time to settle in, scoring five times in his first 16 matches (including a goal less than three minutes into his La Liga debut). Queiroz mostly favoured the adaptable 5–3–2 formation, with two fullbacks Míchel Salgado and Roberto Carlos, often joining the attack down the wings, while Beckham played on the right of the three-man midfield, alongside Zidane and Figo.

Real Madrid were runners-up in the Copa del Rey, were knocked out of the UEFA Champions League at the quarter-final stage and finished the league season in fourth place, meaning the team, whose president Pérez expected them to win either the Spanish league or the Champions League each season, did not match expectations. In July 2004, while Beckham was in pre-season training in Spain, an intruder scaled a wall at the Beckham home while carrying a can of petrol. Victoria and their children were home at the time, but security guards apprehended the man before he reached the house.

==== 2004–2005: Managerial changes ====
The league season began with new head coach José Antonio Camacho at the helm, but he ended up lasting only three matches, handing in his resignation as Real dropped to eighth spot in the La Liga standings. Camacho's assistant Mariano García Remón took over on temporary basis as Real's leadership scrambled to find a permanent replacement. Beckham made more headlines on 9 October 2004 when he admitted intentionally fouling Ben Thatcher in an England match against Wales to get himself booked. Beckham was due to receive a one-match suspension for his next caution, and had picked up an injury which he knew would keep him out of England's next match, so he deliberately fouled Thatcher to serve his suspension in a match that he would have had to miss anyway. The Football Association asked Beckham for an explanation of his actions and he admitted that he had "made a mistake" and apologised.

By the end of 2004, with the team sitting in second position in the league, García Remón was dismissed, and Vanderlei Luxemburgo became the new head coach. However, the well-travelled Brazilian failed to inspire the team to the title as Real again finished the season in second position. On 3 December 2005, Beckham was sent off for the third time that season in a league match against Getafe. A day later Luxemburgo was dismissed and was replaced by Juan Ramón López Caro. By the end of that season, Beckham was third in La Liga in number of assists.

==== 2005–2006: Outpaced by Barcelona ====
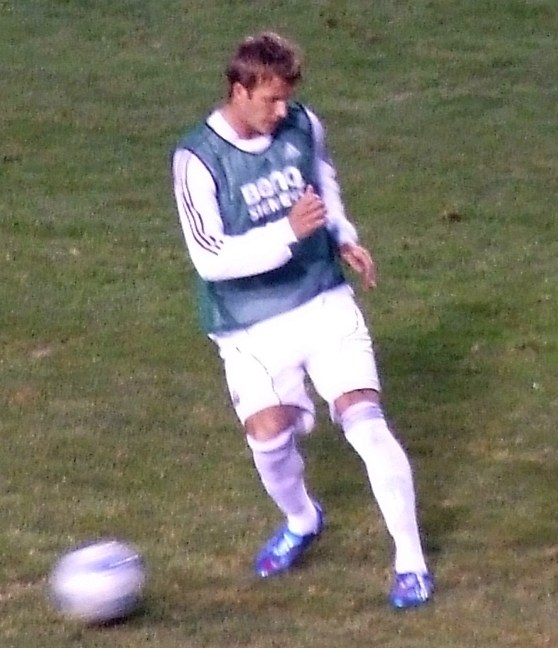
Beckham warming up with Real Madrid in 2006

During the season, Beckham established football academies in Los Angeles and east London and was named a judge for the 2006 British Book Awards. Real Madrid finished second to Barcelona in the 2005–06 La Liga, albeit with a large twelve-point gap, and only reached the last 16 in the Champions League after losing to Arsenal. Pérez resigned his post as president in February 2006, with Vicente Boluda named as replacement on an interim basis until the end of the season.

==== 2006–2007: Real Madrid exit ====
The summer 2006 off-season marked a turbulent time as the club's presidential elections were held. Ramón Calderón became the new Real president. As expected, none of the club officials who served under the previous president was kept, including head coach López Caro. Initially out of favour with newly arrived head coach Fabio Capello, Beckham started only a few games at the beginning of the season, as the speedier José Antonio Reyes was normally preferred on the right wing. Of the first nine matches Beckham started, Real lost seven. On 10 January 2007, after prolonged contractual negotiations, Real Madrid's sporting director Predrag Mijatović announced that Beckham would not remain at Real Madrid after the end of the season. However, he later claimed that he was mistranslated and that he actually said that Beckham's contract had not yet been renewed.

On 11 January 2007, Beckham announced that he had signed a five-year deal to play for the LA Galaxy, beginning 1 July 2007. On 13 January 2007, Fabio Capello said that Beckham had played his last game for Real Madrid, although he continued to train with the team. A few days later, while speaking to the students at Villanueva University Center in Madrid, Calderón said that Beckham is "going to Hollywood to be half a film star", adding "our technical staff were right not to extend his contract, which has been proved by the fact that no other technical staff in the world wanted him except Los Angeles".

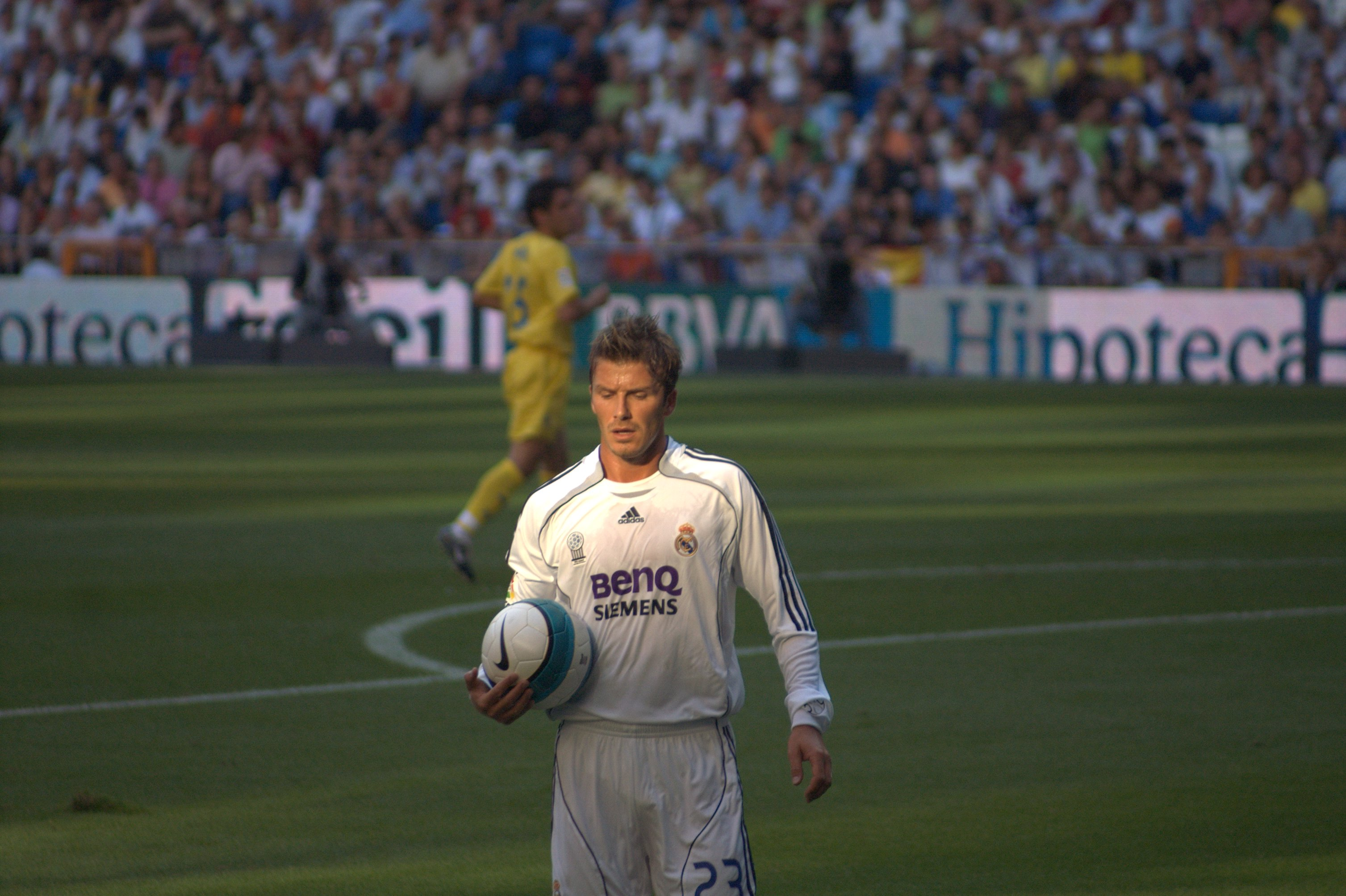
Beckham in 2007 during his last season with Real Madrid

About a month later, however, Capello backtracked on his earlier statement, allowing Beckham to rejoin the team for the match against Real Sociedad on 10 February 2007. The player immediately repaid his head coach's trust by scoring the equalising goal from a 27 yd (25 m) free kick, as Real Madrid eventually recorded a 2–1 victory. In his final UEFA Champions League appearance for the club, Real Madrid were knocked out of the competition by Bayern Munich at the round-of-16 stage (on the away goals rule) on 7 March 2007. Beckham played a pivotal role in all three Madrid goals in the home game, with Bayern goalkeeper Oliver Kahn describing his performance as "world class".

On 17 June 2007, the last day of the La Liga season, Beckham started in his final match for the club, a 3–1 win over Mallorca which saw them clinch the title over Barcelona. With Real down 0–1, Beckham limped off the field and was replaced by José Antonio Reyes, who scored two goals, leading the team to that season's La Liga title, their first since Beckham had signed with them and 30th overall in the club's history. Although Real and Barcelona finished level on points, Madrid took the title because of their superior head-to-head record. With his wife and children, along with celebrity friends Tom Cruise and Katie Holmes, watching from a luxury box at the Santiago Bernabéu, it was only Beckham's second piece of silverware since he joined the club.

Towards the end of the season, as Beckham regained his place in the first team, Real Madrid announced they would try to untie his transfer to LA Galaxy, but were ultimately unsuccessful. Several weeks before Beckham's scheduled arrival in the United States, Real's management contacted LA Galaxy's ownership group about reacquiring the player, but were quickly turned down. A month after the conclusion of Beckham's Real career, Forbes magazine reported that he had been the party primarily responsible for the team's huge increase in merchandise sales, a total reported to top US$600M during Beckham's four years at the club.

=== LA Galaxy ===
==== 2007: First season in MLS ====
"I'm coming there not to be a superstar. I'm coming there to be part of the team, to work hard and to hopefully win things. With me, it's about football. I'm coming there to make a difference. I'm coming there to play football ... I'm not saying me coming over to the States is going to make soccer the biggest sport in America. That would be difficult to achieve. Baseball, basketball, American football, they've been around. But I wouldn't be doing this if I didn't think I could make a difference."

— Beckham on his transfer to the US

Beckham's involvement with Major League Soccer (MLS) began while he was still a Real Madrid player when it was confirmed on 11 January 2007 that he would be leaving Madrid in six months to join MLS side LA Galaxy. The speculation about his new contract in Madrid was thus put to an end and the following day Beckham's official press conference was held in conjunction with the 2007 MLS SuperDraft.

The announcement made global headlines and elevated the league's profile. Though many worldwide media outlets reported the deal to be worth US$250M, the astronomical figure was soon revealed to be a PR stunt engineered by Beckham's media handlers (British representative agency 19 Entertainment). To maximise the media effect, in the press release they decided to list the potential sum that Beckham could make over the five-year period from all his revenue sources, which in addition to his Galaxy pay, also include his personal endorsements. Beckham's actual deal with the Galaxy was a five-year contract worth US$32.5M in total or US$6.5M per year.

The high-profile acquisition paid immediate financial dividends for Galaxy long before Beckham joined the team. On the strength of the signing and the media frenzy it created, the club was able to pull off a new five-year shirt sponsorship deal with the Herbalife nutrition company worth US$20M. The gate revenue peaked as well with 11,000 new season tickets holders and sold-out luxury suites (each one of the 42 inside the team's home stadium, the Home Depot Center). LA Galaxy owners Anschutz Entertainment Group (AEG) also reported an immediate spike in business. Involved on many business fronts worldwide, AEG was already leveraging its Beckham association in places such as Shanghai and Beijing, where the company had been working aggressively for years to receive clearance to build arenas and stadiums. The company's CEO Tim Leiweke put it as follows: "Suddenly, we're known as the company that owns the team that David Beckham is going to play for, so our world changed".

In the months following the announcement, the additional terms of Beckham's contract became public knowledge. One unique contract provision was giving him the option of buying an MLS expansion franchise in any market except New York City at the fixed price of US$25M whenever he stopped playing in the league – an allowance that the league's owners had never given to a player before. Another provision was the opt-out clause after the 2009 season, meaning that should he decide so, Beckham was free to leave the club after completing year three of his five-year contract. The league had a salary cap in place, requiring the creation of the Designated Player Rule for Beckham to bypass the cap; the rule was later nicknamed in his honour. In April 2007, he and wife Victoria bought a US$18.2M home on San Ysidro Drive in Beverly Hills.

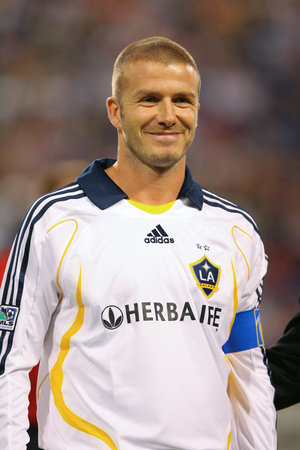
Beckham (with a blue captain's armband) became LA Galaxy captain immediately upon joining the team.

Beckham's contract with LA Galaxy took effect on 11 July, and on 13 July, he was officially unveiled as a Galaxy player at the Home Depot Center, to much fanfare and world media interest, in front of more than 5,000 gathered fans and some 700 accredited media members. Beckham chose to wear number 23. It was announced that Galaxy jersey sales had already reached a record figure of more than US$250,000 prior to this formal introduction.

In parallel, Beckham's handlers at 19 Entertainment succeeded in putting together an unprecedented media rollout designed to expand his carefully crafted personal brand in the US. ESPN sports network ran a promotional campaign and aired the David Beckham: New Beginnings documentary produced by Simon Fuller's 19 Entertainment before the friendly match versus Chelsea, which was expected to be Beckham's US debut. In addition to popularising football, Beckham's arrival was used as platform for entertainment industry endeavours. Since both Beckham's and his wife's often overlapping careers were handled by 19 Entertainment, owned by Fuller, who in turn has a business relationship with the Creative Artists Agency (CAA), one of Hollywood's most powerful talent agencies, it was important for CAA that the Beckhams made as big an impact as possible upon their arrival in the US. That night Victoria's reality show prime-time special Victoria Beckham: Coming to America aired on NBC, drawing negative reviews in the press and poor viewership ratings.

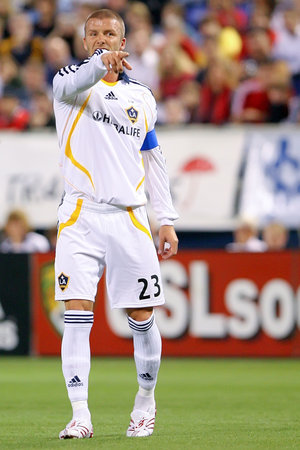
Beckham during an LA Galaxy game in 2007

On 21 July, despite still nursing the injured left ankle that he picked up a month earlier during the final match of La Liga's season, Beckham made his Galaxy debut, coming on for Alan Gordon in the 78th minute of a 0–1 friendly loss to Chelsea as part of the World Series of Soccer. With a capacity crowd, along with a long Hollywood celebrity list featuring Tom Cruise, Katie Holmes, Eva Longoria, Governor of California Arnold Schwarzenegger and Drew Carey among others, present at the Home Depot Center, the match was broadcast live on ESPN's main network. However, the proceedings on the field of play took a back seat to the Beckham spectacle, and despite the presence of star players such as Andriy Shevchenko, Didier Drogba and Michael Ballack, the US television cameras were firmly focused on Beckham, who spent most of the match on the bench. When he came on an already injured Beckham got tackled by Steve Sidwell, sending him airborne before he crumpled to the ground. Though the existing injury was not aggravated too much, Beckham's recovery process was set back by about a week. ESPN's presentation of Beckham's debut earned a 1.0 TV rating, meaning it was seen in an average of 947,000 television homes in the US – a disappointing figure given the national media buzz and two weeks of constant promotion by ESPN.

The day after the made-for-TV debut was reserved for the welcoming party for the Beckhams at LA's Museum of Contemporary Art, formally billed as being hosted by Tom Cruise, Katie Holmes, Will Smith and Jada Pinkett Smith, though in actuality a CAA-organised event. Attended by many Hollywood A-listers, the lavish event was well-covered in the US celebrity tabloid media, including daily entertainment TV magazines such as Entertainment Tonight and Access Hollywood.

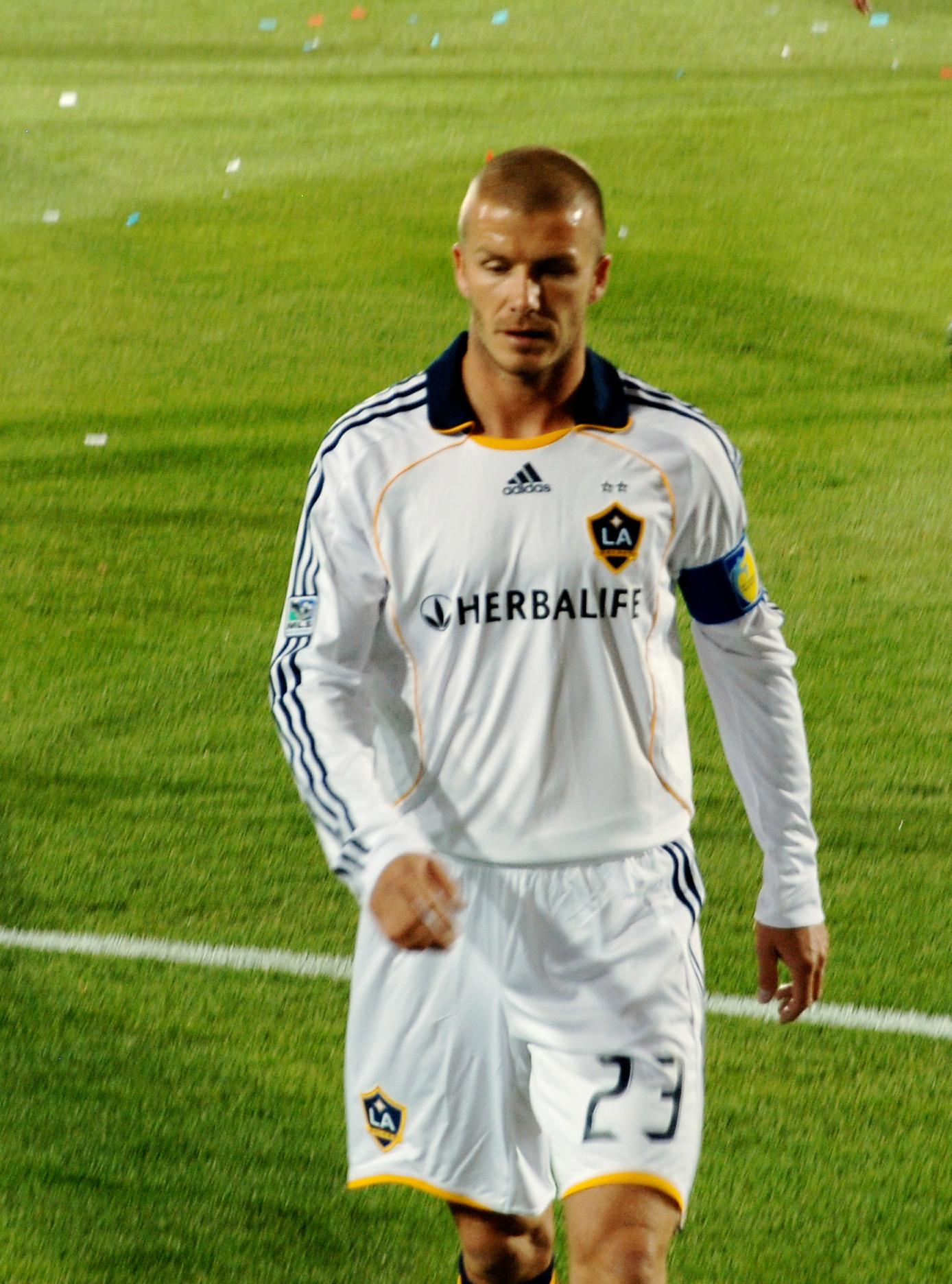
Beckham playing for LA Galaxy in 2008

Two weeks after his twelve-minute appearance against Chelsea, Beckham made his league debut as a substitute on 9 August away versus D.C. United in front of the sellout crowd of 46,686 at the RFK Stadium, coming on for Quavas Kirk in the 71st minute. Coming into the nationally televised match on ESPN, played under a heavy downpour with his team down a man and down a goal, Beckham left a mark during the remaining 20-plus minutes. He hit a long free kick that Carlos Pavón failed to finish on for the equaliser, and then in the final minutes Beckham served a weighted through ball into Landon Donovan's path that United's keeper Troy Perkins managed to break up in the last moment – the Galaxy lost 1–0. Beckham returned to the pitch the following week, again facing D.C. United, in the SuperLiga semi-final on 15 August, his first start, and first game as team captain. He scored his first goal for the team, from a free kick, and also made his first assist, for Landon Donovan in the second half. These goals gave the team a 2–0 victory, and a place in the North American SuperLiga final versus Pachuca on 29 August.

==== 2008 ====
Beckham trained with Arsenal from 4 January 2008 for three weeks, until he returned to the Galaxy for pre-season training. Beckham scored his first league goal with the Galaxy on 3 April, against the San Jose Earthquakes in the ninth minute. On 24 May 2008, the Galaxy defeated the Kansas City Wizards 3–1, giving the Galaxy their first winning record in two years and moving the club into first place in the Western Conference. In the match, Beckham scored an empty-net goal from 70 yd (64 m) out. The goal marked the second time in Beckham's career that he had scored from his own half, the other being a 1996-goal from the half-way line against Wimbledon at Selhurst Park. Overall, however, the Galaxy had a disappointing year, failing to qualify for the end-of-season play-offs.

==== 2009: Loan to AC Milan ====
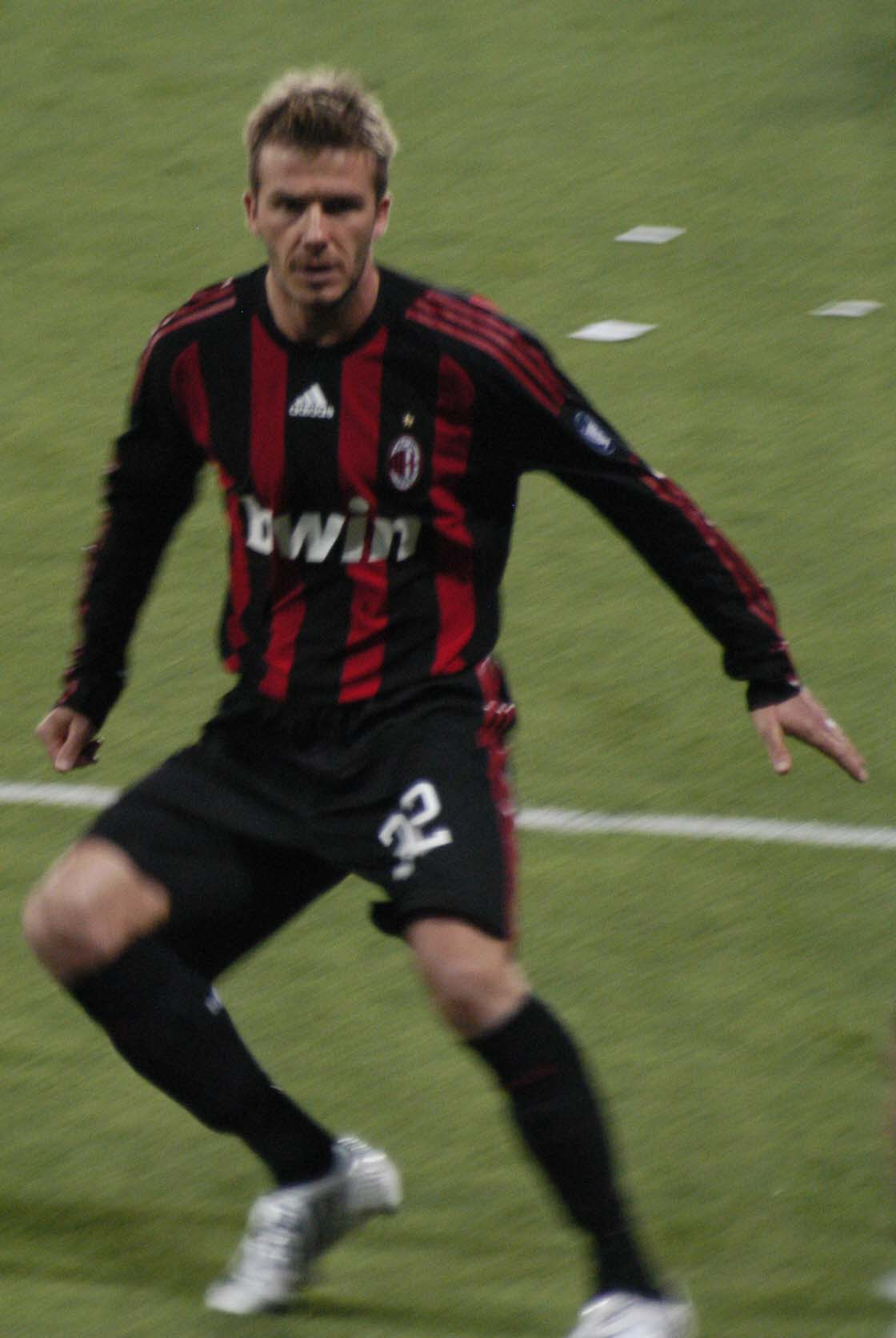
Beckham playing for AC Milan in 2009

In 2008, Beckham's success in the England national team under Fabio Capello led to speculation that he might return to Europe to retain match fitness for the World Cup qualifying matches in 2009. On 30 October 2008, AC Milan announced that Beckham was to join them on loan from 7 January 2009. Despite this and other speculation, Beckham made it clear that the move in no way signalled his intent to leave MLS and announced his intent to return to the Galaxy in time for the start of the 2009 season in March. Many at Milan both within and outside of the club expressed serious reservations about the transfer, with it considered by some players no more than a marketing move.

Beckham was unveiled at Milan's training facility by the club's chief executive Adriano Galliani on 20 December 2008. The player chose the number 32 shirt previously worn by Christian Vieri. The day after his unveiling, Beckham was brought to the San Siro, where he was introduced to the home fans by walking out on the pitch before the league match versus Udinese and proclaiming "Forza Milan" over the public address system.

"On the pitch, Beckham sees everything before everyone else. His vision of play is better now than during his time in Manchester. He is slower but much stronger tactically and technically. He is very intelligent and works a lot."

— AC Milan coach Carlo Ancelotti on Beckham's condition at 33 years old.

Playing on the squad led by the 26-year-old star Kaká, in addition to several other world-class players at or near the peak of their careers – such as 28-year-old Ronaldinho and 29-year-old Andrea Pirlo – as well as club veterans Paolo Maldini, Clarence Seedorf, Massimo Ambrosini, Gianluca Zambrotta, Filippo Inzaghi and Andriy Shevchenko, Beckham made his competitive debut for the rossoneri in Serie A as a starter away at Roma on 11 January 2009, playing 89 minutes of the 2–2 draw in front of 53,444 at the Stadio Olimpico. Playing his first competitive match in almost three months, Beckham gave a decent performance in right midfield alongside Pirlo. Though lacking match fitness and occasionally struggling to keep up in a high-tempo match, Beckham put in enough useful crosses and corners to justify the coach Carlo Ancelotti's decision to play him from the start. In Beckham's home debut against Fiorentina a week later, he turned in another understated performance on the right side of midfield before advancing into a more active central role in the second half. Milan won 1–0 courtesy of Pato, but the 65,000 San Siro crowd mostly focused on Kaká, imploring him to stay.

A noticeably older team, the Ancelotti-coached Milan was proving a good fit for the 33-year-old Englishman. He scored his first goal in Serie A for Milan in a 4–1 victory over Bologna on 25 January, his third appearance for the club. Though Beckham was expected to return to Los Angeles in March, after impressing at the Italian club, scoring two goals in his first four matches and assisting on several more, rumours began to swirl that Beckham would stay in Milan, with the Italian club reportedly offering to pay a multi-million-US dollar fee. The rumours were confirmed on 4 February, when Beckham stated that he was seeking a permanent transfer to Milan, in a bid to sustain his England career through the 2010 World Cup. Milan, however, failed to match Galaxy's valuation of Beckham, in the US$10–15M range.

Still, negotiations continued during a month of speculation. On 2 March, the Los Angeles Times reported that Beckham's loan had been extended through mid-July. This was later confirmed by Beckham, revealing what was described as a unique "timeshare" deal, in which Beckham would play with LA from mid-July until the end of the 2009 MLS season.

==== 2009: Return to Galaxy ====
After his return from Milan, many LA fans showed dislike and anger towards him as he missed the first half of the season, and several held up signs saying "Go home fraud", and "Part-time player". The Galaxy, however, had a much more successful season than in previous years, rising from third to first in the Western Conference during Beckham's time with them. He remained a key part of the squad which saw Galaxy win the 2009 Western Conference final after a 2–0 overtime victory over the Houston Dynamo. In the MLS Cup final on 22 November 2009, the Galaxy lost to Real Salt Lake by 5–4 in a penalty shoot-out after a 1–1 draw. Beckham scored in the shootout.

==== 2010: Second loan to Milan ====
In November 2009, after the end of 2009 MLS season, it was confirmed that Beckham would return to Milan for a second loan period, beginning in January 2010. On 6 January 2010, Beckham made a winning return in a Milan shirt, playing 75 minutes of a 5–2 victory over Genoa. On 16 February 2010, Beckham played against Manchester United for the first time since he left the club in 2003. He played 76 minutes of the match at the San Siro – which ended 3–2 to Manchester United – before being substituted for Clarence Seedorf.

Beckham returned to Old Trafford for the second leg of the tie on 10 March 2010; he did not start the match, but was brought on for Ignazio Abate in the 64th minute to a positive reception from the Manchester United fans. The score was 3–0 for United at that point and the tie was all but decided. The match was the first time Beckham had played against Manchester United at Old Trafford, and saw him create several scoring opportunities via crosses and corner kicks, but Manchester United dominated Milan and beat them 4–0, winning the tie 7–2. Following the final whistle, he aroused a bit of controversy by draping the green-and-gold scarf around his neck that was given to him by the Manchester United supporters protesting against club owner Malcolm Glazer. As the fan protests against Glazer by the people gathered around Manchester United Supporters' Trust gained steam in 2010, the green-and-gold scarf had come to be seen as an anti-Glazer symbol, and by extension many saw Beckham's decision to publicly put it on as gesture of support. When asked about it later, however, Beckham responded that protests are not his business.

In Milan's next game, against Chievo, Beckham suffered a torn left Achilles tendon, causing him to miss the World Cup as well as the MLS season due to the injury, which took him out of action for the next five months. Doctor Sakari Orava performed surgery on Beckham's tendon in Turku, Finland, on 15 March 2010. After the operation, Orava confirmed: "it went quite fine. The prognosis is he needs a rehabilitation for the next few months, and the plaster cast is the next six to eight weeks. I would say that [it will be] maybe four months before he's running, but six months before he's jumping and kicking."

==== 2010: Second return to Galaxy ====
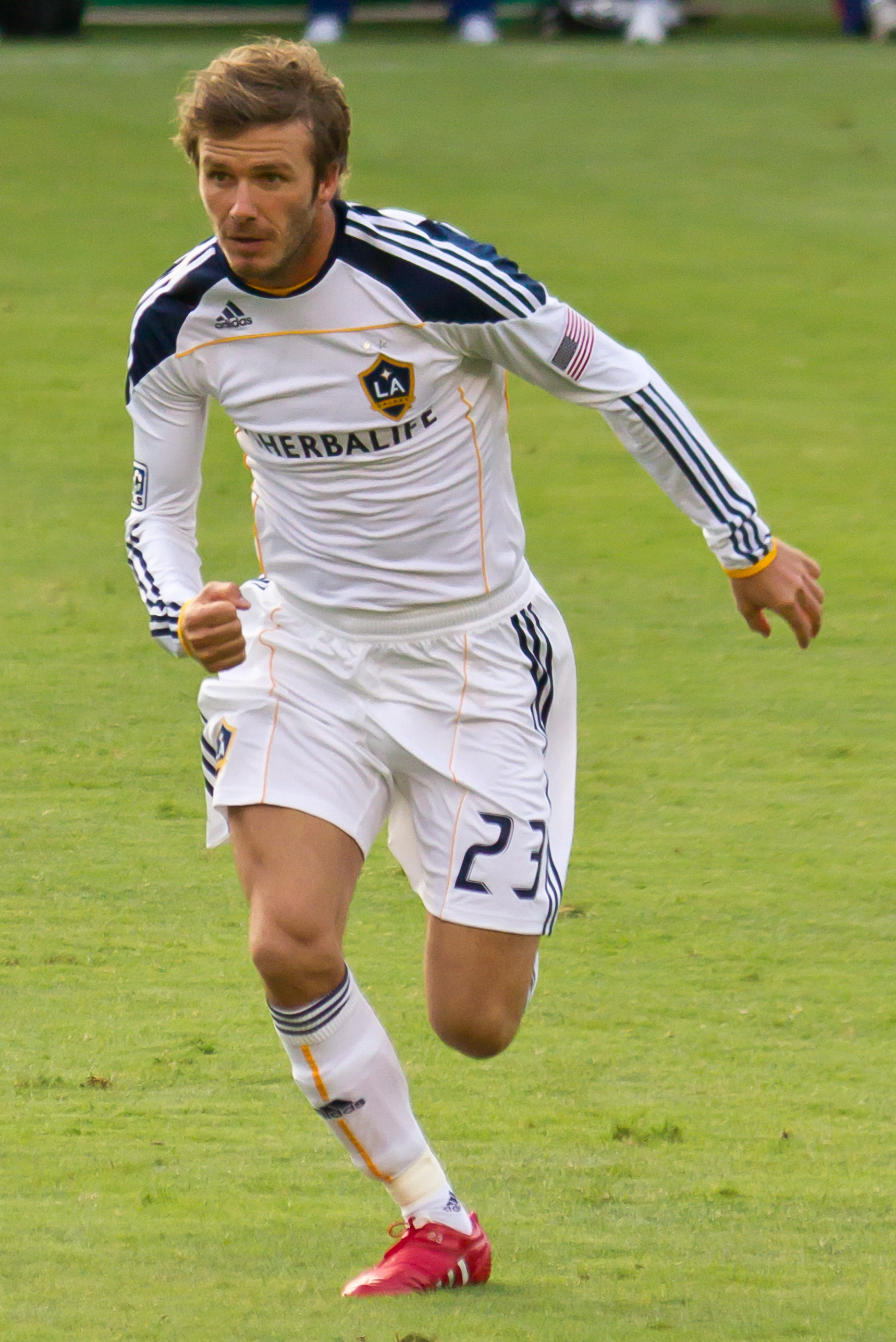
Beckham playing for LA Galaxy in 2010

On 11 September 2010, after recovering from his Achilles tendon injury, Beckham returned to the game as a substitute in the 70th minute in the Galaxy's 3–1 win over Columbus Crew. On 4 October, Beckham scored a trademark free kick in a 2–1 win over Chivas USA to mark his first goal in 2010. On 24 October, Beckham scored his second goal of the season in the Galaxy's 2–1 win over FC Dallas which secured them their second successive Western Conference title and first MLS Supporters' Shield since 2002.

==== 2011: MLS Cup champion ====
In early 2011, ahead of the 2011 MLS season, Beckham trained with Tottenham Hotspur. Rumours in the media claimed that the club were in talks with the Galaxy to sign the player on loan, but, according to Spurs manager Harry Redknapp, the move was blocked by Galaxy, who wanted a full final season from him. As a result, he ended up only training with the club as he had done with Arsenal three years earlier. With Beckham playing in the centre of midfield, the Galaxy won the 2011 MLS cup.

On 15 May, Beckham scored his first goal of the season for the Galaxy from a 30 yd (27 m) free kick, in a 4–1 victory over Sporting Kansas City. On 9 July, Beckham scored directly from a corner in a 2–1 win over Chicago Fire, repeating a feat he achieved while playing for Preston North End.

After having his best season with the Galaxy to date, and finishing second in the league in assists, Beckham finished his fifth MLS season on a high. On 20 November 2011, he joined an elite group of players to have won league titles in three countries, when Los Angeles won their third MLS Cup against the Houston Dynamo, winning 1–0 on a goal by captain Landon Donovan, with assists from Beckham and fellow designated player Robbie Keane.

==== 2012: Second successive cup victory ====
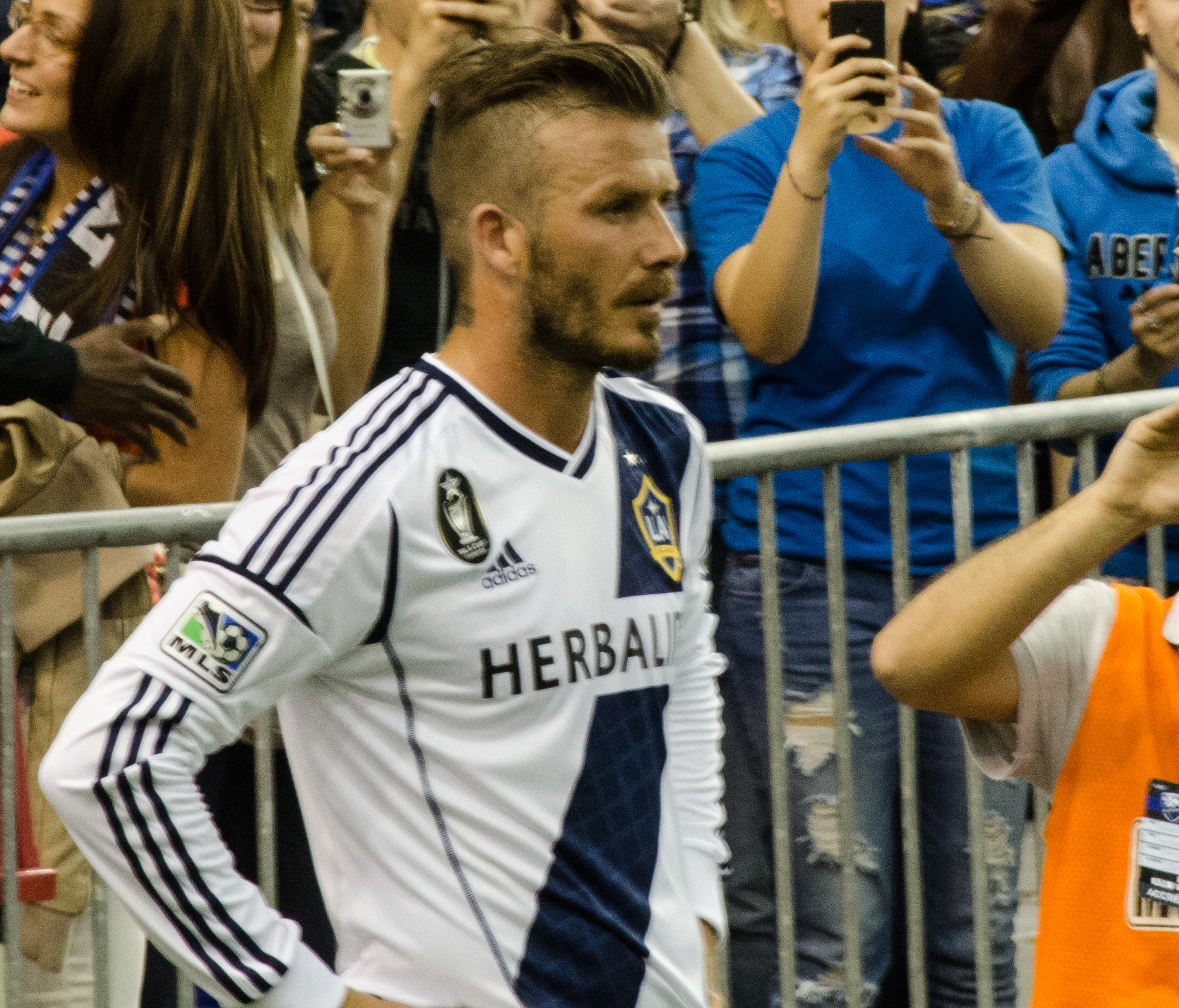
Beckham with LA Galaxy in 2012

Following the 2011 season, in which the Galaxy won their second consecutive Supporters' Shield, having the second most points in MLS history, Beckham's five-year contract with the Galaxy expired on 31 December 2011. Despite being 36, he stated that he did not intend to retire. Beckham was heavily linked with Paris Saint-Germain, but on 18 January 2012, Galaxy announced Beckham had signed a new two-year contract to remain in Los Angeles. In May 2012, Beckham and his victorious teammates were received by US President Barack Obama at the White House.

Beckham helped the Galaxy to a fourth-place finish in the Western Conference during the 2012 regular season, with Beckham scoring seven goals and adding nine assists. The Galaxy defeated Vancouver Whitecaps FC, the San Jose Earthquakes and Seattle Sounders FC on their way to the MLS Cup final, where they defeated the Houston Dynamo 3–1 to retain the cup. He was subbed off in the 89th minute for Marcelo Sarvas, and was given a standing ovation at their home venue. Beckham had earlier announced that the 2012 MLS Cup Final would be his final game with the Galaxy, despite having another year remaining on his contract.

=== Paris Saint-Germain ===
On 31 January 2013, ahead of the transfer deadline, it was announced that Beckham would be undergoing a medical with Paris Saint-Germain, ahead of a potential move to the Ligue 1 side. Beckham signed a five-month deal with the club later that afternoon, and confirmed that his entire salary during his time in Paris would be donated to a local children's charity. His PSG debut came on 24 February 2013, when he came off the bench in the 76th minute in a Ligue 1 home match against Marseille. This made him the 400th player in the history of the club. On 12 May 2013, Beckham won a fourth different top flight winners' medal, after PSG beat Lyon 1–0 to claim the Ligue 1 title.

On 16 May 2013, Beckham announced that he would retire from professional football at the end of that year's French football season. Following his decision to retire at the end of the 2012–13 season, Beckham was given specially designed boots in the colours of the Union Jack to wear in his final game. These boots had the names of his wife and children stitched on them. On 18 May 2013, Beckham was made captain in his final home game against Brest. In this game, Beckham assisted a goal by Matuidi from a corner, in what would be the final play of his professional career. In the 79th minute, he was subbed off for Ezequiel Lavezzi before receiving hugs from his fellow players and manager, as well as a standing ovation from the fans in attendance, with Beckham tearfully waving and bidding the fans farewell. PSG went on to win the game 3–1.

== International career ==
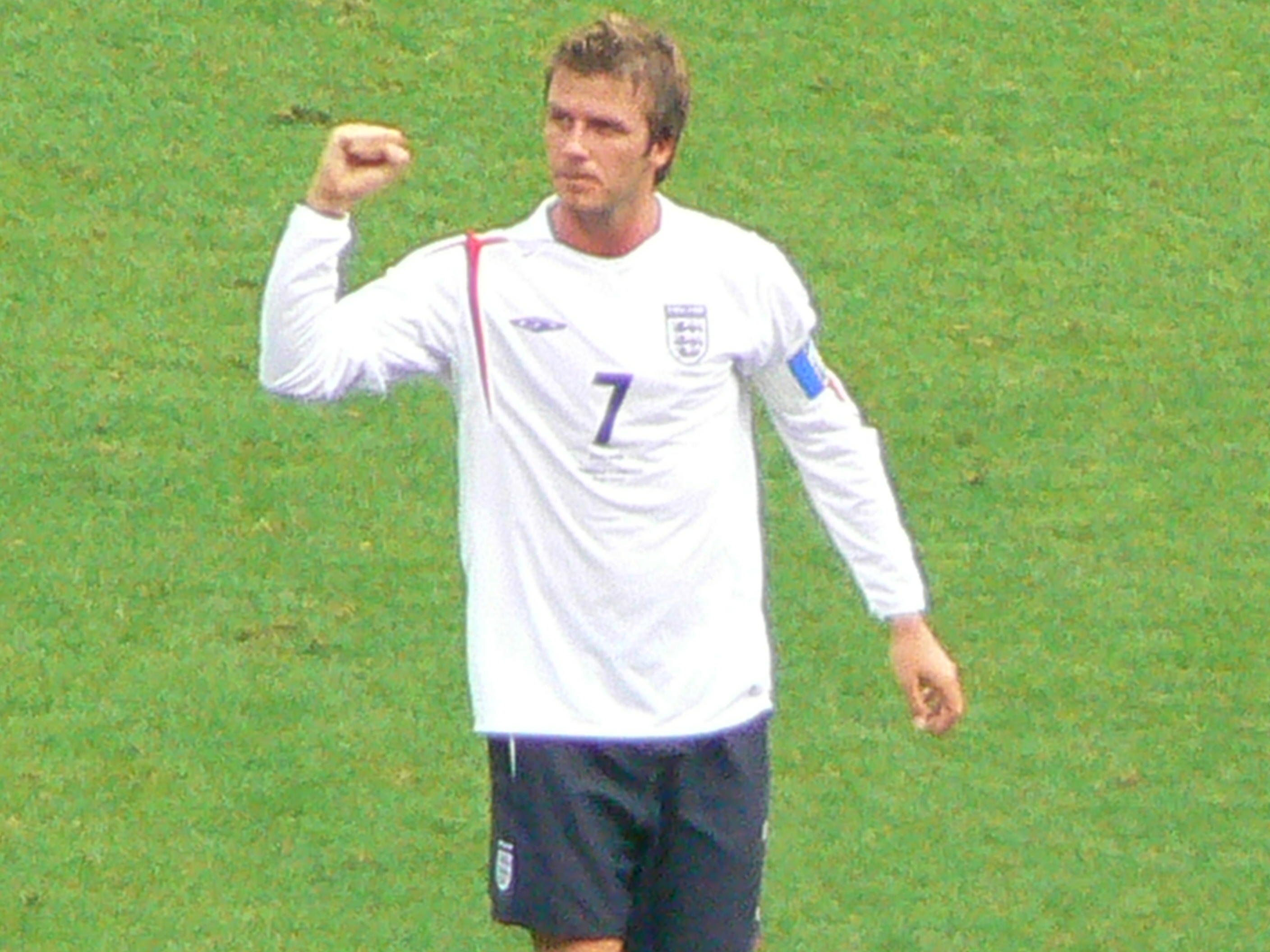
Beckham captained England 59 times in 115 appearances, the fourth-highest after Bobby Moore, Billy Wright and Bryan Robson.

On 1 September 1996, Beckham made his first appearance for England in a FIFA World Cup qualifying match against Moldova.

In June 1997, Beckham participated in the Tournoi de France, the friendly international football tournament held in France as a warm-up to the 1998 FIFA World Cup.

=== 1998 FIFA World Cup ===
Beckham played in all of England's qualifying matches for the 1998 FIFA World Cup and was part of the 23-man squad for the finals in France, but the team's manager Glenn Hoddle publicly accused him of not concentrating on the tournament, and he did not start in either of England's first two games. He was picked for the third game against Colombia and scored with a bending 30 yd (27 m) free kick in a 2–0 victory, which was his first goal for England.

In the second round (last 16) of that competition, he received a red card in England's match against Argentina. Beckham, after having been fouled by Diego Simeone, kicked Simeone while lying on the ground, striking him on the calf. Sports Illustrated was critical of the Argentinian's theatrics in that incident, stating that Simeone first delivered a "heavy-handed challenge" on Beckham, and then "fell like a ton of bricks" when Beckham retaliated. Simeone later admitted to trying to get Beckham sent off by over-reacting to the kick and then, along with other members of his team, urging the referee to send Beckham off. The match finished in a draw, and England were eliminated in a penalty shootout. Many supporters and journalists blamed Beckham for England's elimination and he became the target of criticism and abuse, including the hanging of an effigy outside a London pub, and the Daily Mirror printing a dartboard of him. He received death threats after the World Cup.

=== Euro 2000 and England captaincy ===
The abuse that Beckham was receiving from English supporters peaked during England's 3–2 defeat by Portugal in Euro 2000, a match where Beckham set up two goals, when a group of England supporters taunted him throughout the match. Beckham responded by raising his middle finger and, while the gesture attracted some criticism, many of the newspapers that had previously encouraged his vilification asked their readers to stop abusing him.

"We've played two and a half minutes of stoppage time. England trail by 2 goals to 1. Beckham could raise the roof here with a goal ... I don't believe it! David Beckham scores the goal to take England all the way to the World Cup Finals! ... Give that man a Knighthood!"

— Television commentary on Beckham's stoppage time 30 yd (27 m) curling free-kick against Greece in the 2002 World Cup qualifying game in October 2001.

On 15 November 2000, following Kevin Keegan's resignation as England manager in October, Beckham was promoted to team captain by the caretaker manager Peter Taylor, and then kept the role under new manager Sven-Göran Eriksson.

Beckham played a major role in helping England qualify for the 2002 FIFA World Cup, starring in an impressive 5–1 victory over Germany in Munich. The final step in Beckham's conversion from villain to national hero happened in England's final qualifying game against Greece on 6 October 2001. England needed to win or draw the match to qualify outright for the World Cup, but were losing 2–1 with little time remaining. When Teddy Sheringham was fouled 8 yd (7 m) outside the Greek penalty area, England were awarded a free kick and Beckham ensured England's qualification with a curling strike of the kind that had become his trademark. Beckham was voted the BBC Sports Personality of the Year for 2001, and finished runner-up to Luís Figo of Portugal, for the FIFA World Player of the Year award.

=== 2002 FIFA World Cup and Euro 2004 ===
Beckham was partially fit by the time of the 2002 World Cup held in Japan and South Korea, and played in the first match against Sweden. After the events of four years earlier, Beckham achieved a degree of revenge over Argentina by scoring the winning goal with a penalty. England defeated Denmark in the second round with Beckham providing an assist in a 3–0 win. England were knocked out in the quarter-finals by eventual winners Brazil after Ronaldinho scored the winner; following the match, Beckham was criticised in the media for jumping over a tackle late in the first half, which led to Brazil's equaliser.

The following month, at the opening ceremony of the 2002 Commonwealth Games in Manchester, Beckham escorted Kirsty Howard as she presented the Jubilee Baton to the Queen. Beckham played in all of England's matches at Euro 2004. He had a penalty saved in England's opening 2–1 defeat to France and missed another in a penalty shootout in the quarter-final match against hosts Portugal, following a 2–2 draw. England lost the shootout 6–5, thus going out of the competition.

In October 2005, Beckham's sending off against Austria made him the first England captain to be sent off and the first player to be sent off twice while playing for England. He captained England for the 50th time in a friendly international against Argentina the following month.

=== 2006 FIFA World Cup ===
In England's opening game at the 2006 World Cup, against Paraguay on 10 June 2006, Beckham's free kick led to an own-goal by Carlos Gamarra as England won 1–0. In England's next match, played against Trinidad and Tobago on 15 June 2006, Beckham's cross in the 83rd minute led to a Peter Crouch goal, which put England into the lead 1–0. Beckham gave another assist to Steven Gerrard. In the end they won 2–0.

During England's second round match against Ecuador, Beckham scored from a free kick in the 59th minute, becoming the first English player to score in three separate World Cups, and giving England a 1–0 victory and a place in the quarter-finals. He was sick before the game and vomited several times as a result of dehydration and illness that he got after having scored the winning goal for England. In the quarter-final against Portugal, Beckham was substituted following an injury shortly after half time and the England team went on to lose the match on penalties (3–1), the score having been 0–0 after extra time. After his substitution, Beckham was visibly shaken and emotional for not being able to play, being in tears at one point.

A day after England was knocked out of the World Cup, an emotional Beckham made a statement in a news conference that he had stepped down as England captain, stating: "It has been an honour and privilege to captain my country but, having been captain for 58 of my 95 games, I feel the time is right to pass on the armband as we enter a new era under Steve McClaren." (Beckham had won 94 caps up to that point.) He was succeeded by Chelsea captain John Terry.

Having stepped down as captain after the World Cup, Beckham was dropped completely from the England national team selected by new coach Steve McClaren on 11 August 2006. McClaren said that he was "looking to go in a different direction" with the team, and that Beckham "wasn't included within that".

=== Post-2006 World Cup ===
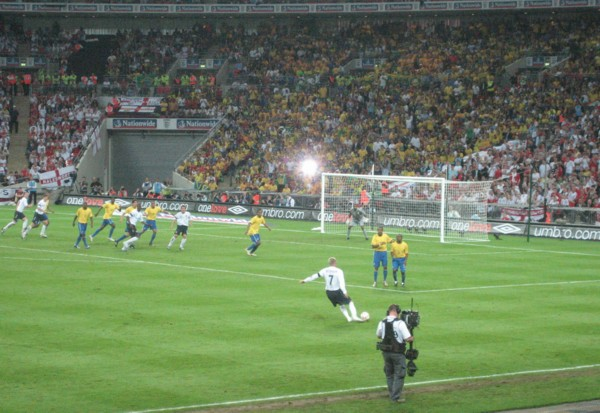
Beckham takes the free kick against Brazil from which John Terry scored.

On 26 May 2007, McClaren announced that Beckham would be recalled to the England squad for the first time since stepping down as their captain. Beckham started against Brazil in England's first match at the new Wembley Stadium and put in a positive performance. In the second half, he set up England's goal converted by captain John Terry. It looked as though England would claim victory over Brazil, but newcomer Diego equalised in the dying seconds. In England's next match, a Euro 2008 qualifier against Estonia, Beckham sent two trademark assists for Michael Owen and Peter Crouch, helping England to prevail 3–0. Beckham had assisted in three of England's four total goals in those two games, and he stated his desire to continue to play for England after his move to Major League Soccer.

On 22 August 2007, Beckham played in a friendly for England against Germany, becoming the first to play for England while with a non-European club team. On 21 November 2007, Beckham earned his 99th cap against Croatia, setting up a goal for Peter Crouch to tie the game at 2–2. Following the 2–3 loss, England failed to qualify for the Euro 2008 Finals. Despite this, Beckham said that he had no plans to retire from international football and wanted to continue playing for the national team. After being passed over by new England coach and Beckham's former manager at Real Madrid, Fabio Capello, for a friendly against Switzerland which would have given him his hundredth cap, Beckham admitted that he was not in shape at the time, as he had not played a competitive match in three months.

=== 100 England caps, final appearance ===
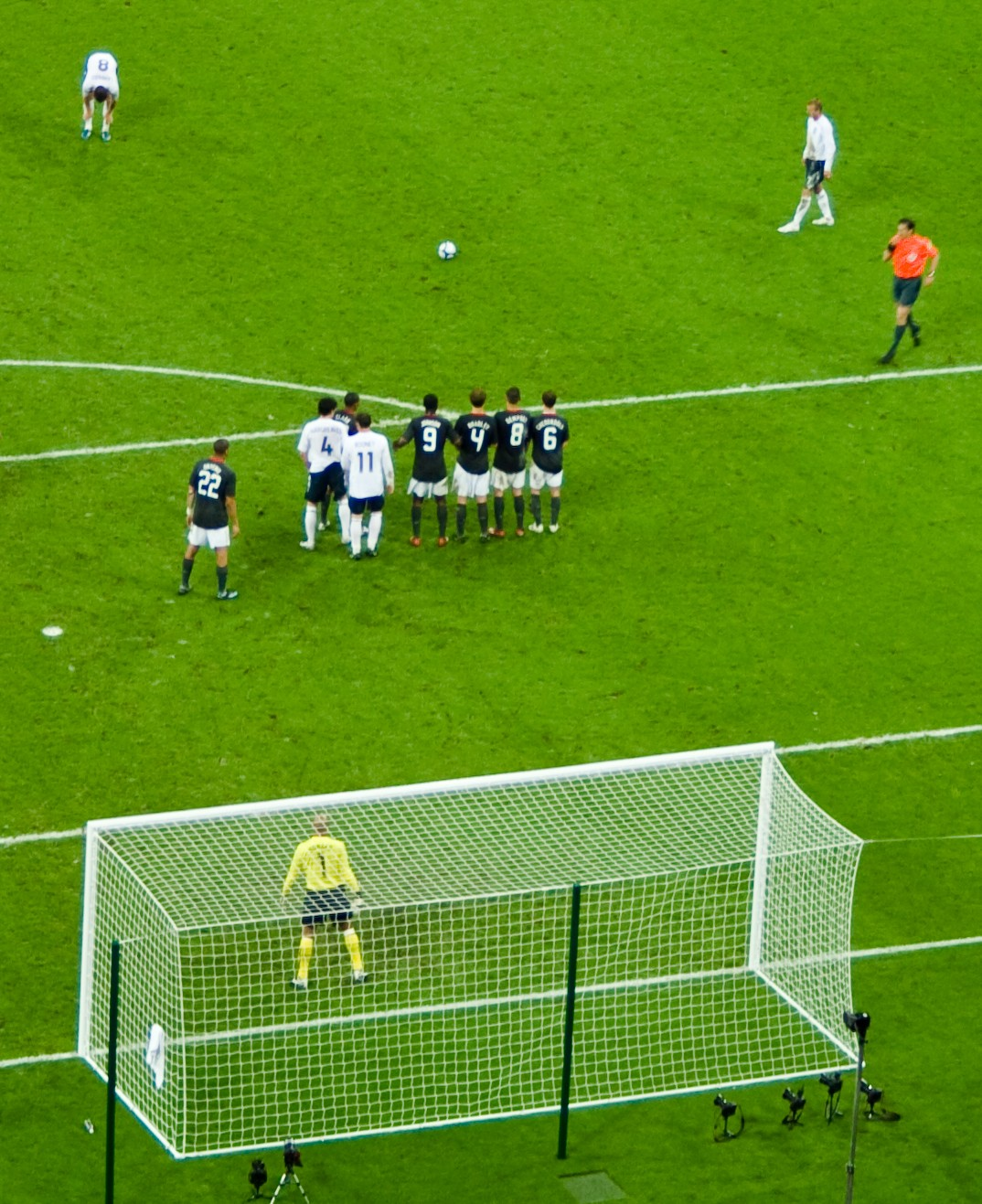
Beckham lining up a free kick for England in 2008

On 20 March 2008, Beckham was recalled to the England squad by Capello for the friendly against France in Paris on 26 March. Beckham became only the fifth Englishman to win 100 caps. Capello had hinted on 25 March 2008 that Beckham had a long-term future in his side, ahead of crucial qualifiers for the 2010 World Cup.

On 11 May 2008, Capello included an in-form Beckham in his 31-man England squad to face the United States at Wembley on 28 May before the away fixture with Trinidad and Tobago on 1 June. Beckham – who wore a pair of golden boots to mark the occasion – was honoured before the match by receiving an honorary gold cap representing his 100th cap from Bobby Charlton, and was given a standing ovation from the crowd. He played well and assisted John Terry on the match-winning goal. When substituted at half-time for David Bentley, the pro-Beckham crowd booed the decision. In a surprise move, Capello handed Beckham the captaincy for England's friendly against Trinidad and Tobago on 1 June 2008. The match was the first time since the 2006 World Cup that Beckham had skippered England and marked a dramatic turnaround for Beckham. In two years, he had gone from being dropped completely from the England squad to being reinstated (though temporarily) as England captain.

During the 2010 World Cup Qualifier against Belarus, which England won 3–1 in Minsk, Beckham came off the bench in the 87th minute to earn his 107th cap making him England's third-most-capped player in history, overtaking Bobby Charlton in the process. On 11 February 2009, Beckham drew level with Bobby Moore's record of 108 caps for an English outfield player, coming on as a substitute for Stewart Downing in a friendly match against Spain. On 28 March 2009, Beckham surpassed Moore to hold the record outright when he came on as a substitute in a friendly against Slovakia, providing the assist for a goal from Wayne Rooney in the process. Overall, Beckham had made 16 appearances out of a possible 20 for England under Capello until his ruptured Achilles tendon of March 2010 ruled him out of selection for the 2010 FIFA World Cup in South Africa. His last game for England before injury had been on 14 October 2009 as a substitute in England's last World Cup qualifying game, which ended England 3–0 Belarus.

After a poor performance from England at the World Cup, Capello remained as manager but was under pressure to revamp the England squad for the imminent UEFA Euro 2012 qualification campaign. He unveiled a new team at the next England match, a home friendly match against Hungary on 11 August 2010, with Beckham still unavailable for selection but aiming for a return to playing in MLS by the following month. In the post-match interview, Capello said of the prospect of the now 35-year-old Beckham playing any future competitive matches for England, that: "I need to change it. David is a fantastic player but I think we need new players for the future", referring to the new players that play in Beckham's right midfield position, including Theo Walcott and Adam Johnson, adding: "This is the future of the team under Fabio Capello or another manager." He said that Beckham may be selected for one last friendly game, stating, "If he is fit, I hope we will play one more game here at Wembley so the fans can say goodbye." Beckham's agent released a statement reiterating Beckham's position that he had no desire to retire from international football, and would always make himself available for selection for England if fit and if needed.

Beckham remained ten caps short of the record number of 125 caps by goalkeeper Peter Shilton, for a player of any position. Beckham was named in the provisional squad to represent the Great Britain Olympic football team at the 2012 Olympics. He was not included in the final selection by manager Stuart Pearce, while Andy Hunt, the head of the British Olympic Association, contacted Beckham's representatives for him to be related to Team GB more broadly.

== Player profile ==
=== Style of play ===
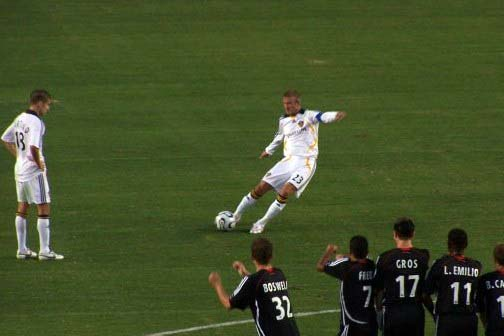
Beckham scoring with a bending free kick in 2007. His typical pose when striking free kicks or crossing the ball in open play, his body leans to the left to generate extra whip on the ball.

Throughout his career, Beckham was considered one of the best and most recognisable players of his generation, as well as one of the greatest free-kick exponents of all time. In September 2023, Beckham was ranked joint-5th all time (alongside Lionel Messi) in goals scored from direct free kicks with sixty-five. Beckham has been rated by some pundits as one of the greatest wide midfielders of all time. Predominantly right-footed, his range of passing, vision, crossing ability and bending free-kicks enabled him to create chances for teammates or score goals, attributes that saw him excel as a right winger, despite his lack of significant pace. Unlike his Manchester United teammate Ryan Giggs on the opposite wing, Beckham preferred to beat players through his movement and passing, rather than going at opponents directly with the ball. He formed a strong partnership on the right side of the pitch with full-back Gary Neville during his time with the club, due to their understanding, as well as Neville's ability to get forward with his overlapping runs, get on the end of Beckham's passes, and deliver crosses into the box whenever the latter was heavily marked.

Although Beckham primarily played on the right flank, he was also used as a central midfielder throughout his career (occasionally with Manchester United, but in particular with Real Madrid and AC Milan), and on rare instances as a deep-lying playmaker, in particular in his later career, to compensate for his physical decline with his advancing age. Beckham felt that his best role was on the right, although he personally preferred playing in the centre. In addition to his passing, crossing, and prowess from set-pieces, Beckham stood out for his stamina and defensive work-rate on the pitch, having played both as an attacking midfielder and as a box-to-box midfielder in his youth; he was occasionally deployed as a wing-back. Moreover, he was also an accurate striker of the ball from distance, as well as being a competent penalty taker. He also drew praise in the media for his ball control and ability to create space for himself on the pitch, as well as his anticipation, composure, determination, athleticism, dedication, and intelligence as a footballer.

=== Approach to training and praise from managers ===
"David Beckham is Britain's finest striker of a football not because of God-given talent but because he practises with a relentless application that the vast majority of less gifted players wouldn't contemplate."

— Former Manchester United manager Alex Ferguson.

Beckham was a product of Sir Alex Ferguson's hard-working approach at Manchester United. Ferguson said that Beckham "practised with a discipline to achieve an accuracy that other players wouldn't care about". Beckham reportedly spent hours practising his free kicks after training sessions had ended.

Beckham maintained his training routine at Real Madrid and even when his relationship with management was strained in early 2007, Real Madrid president Ramón Calderón and manager Fabio Capello praised Beckham for maintaining his professionalism and commitment to the club. Beckham's Real Madrid teammate Roberto Carlos regarded Beckham to be the best free-kick exponent he had ever seen. One of the other best free kick exponents of their generation, Roberto Carlos, commented on the dilemma the team faced when they won a free kick on the edge of the penalty area: "I would stand on one side and Beckham on the other but I wanted to see Beckham take the free-kick because it's beautiful how he hits the ball." During Beckham's time with Milan, his manager Carlo Ancelotti praised the Englishman for his intelligence and work-rate, in particular the improvements he demonstrated to the technical and tactical aspects of his game, which allowed him to compensate for his loss of pace.

His former England manager Steve McClaren stated:

I've been very fortunate to work with some great players and he [Beckham] was one of them. He was a great player, he made the very most of his talents and that was through sheer hard work, professionalism, always doing extra on the training field. He inspired his team-mates through his performances, he was a winner. He was a leader, people followed him.

Arsenal manager Arsène Wenger stated, "What remains in your memory is his genuine commitment and dedication, his natural humility which he always had, that will stay forever."

In May 2013, asked about how he wanted to be remembered in his retirement, Beckham said, "I just want people to see me as a hardworking footballer, someone that's passionate about the game, someone that – every time I stepped on the pitch – I've given everything that I have, because that's how I feel. That's how I look back on it and hope people will see me."

=== Discipline ===
Earlier in his career, Beckham's discipline during matches was brought into question on occasion in the media, due to his temper and his tendency to commit rash challenges and pick up unnecessary bookings. Beckham was the first England player ever to collect two red cards, and the first England captain to be sent off. Beckham's most notorious red card was during the 1998 World Cup after Argentina's Diego Simeone had fouled him: Beckham, lying face down on the pitch, kicked out at the Argentine midfielder, who fell dramatically. Along with Wayne Rooney, he holds the record for the most red cards for England at international level. His second red card for England came on 8 October 2005, in a 2006 World Cup qualifier against Austria in Manchester.

His only red card with Manchester United came on 6 January 2000, in the 2000 FIFA Club World Championship against Necaxa. During his time at Real Madrid, he amassed 41 yellow cards and four red cards in La Liga; he also received a red card in a Copa del Rey match against Valencia on 21 January 2004, in Madrid. His only red card with LA Galaxy came on 15 August 2009, in a 2–0 home defeat to the Seattle Sounders in MLS. He received one red card while at Paris Saint-Germain, in a match against Evian on 28 April 2013. Between 2000 and 2013, Beckham played 572 competitive games for England, Milan, LA Galaxy, Manchester United, Real Madrid and PSG, and he received nine red cards – one every 63–64 matches, on average.

=== Reception ===
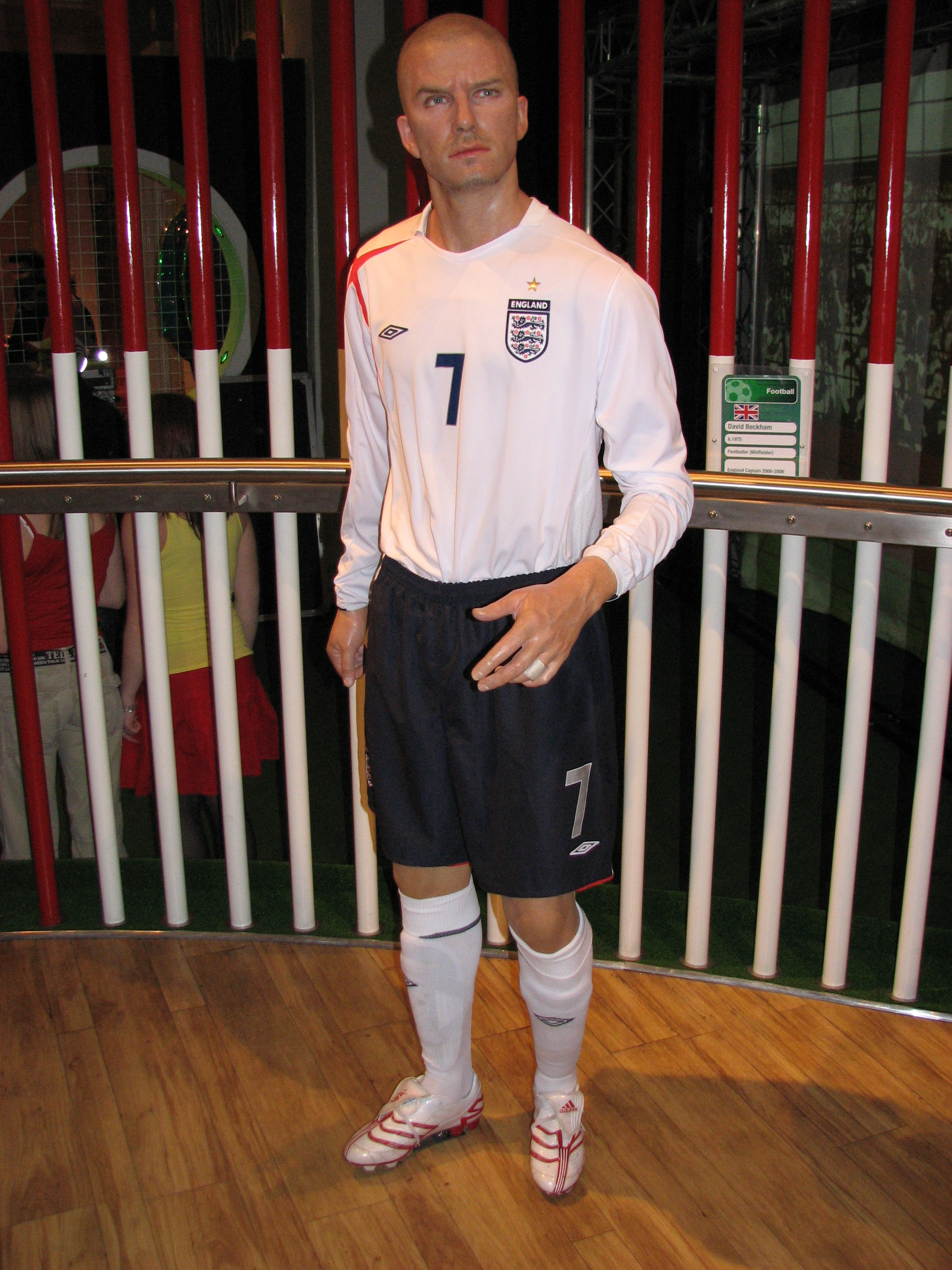
Wax statue of Beckham at Madame Tussauds, London

Despite his success, popularity, and playing ability, critical reception of Beckham was often divided among sporting figures and fans throughout his career, in part – as Subhankar Mondal of Goal notes – due to his ventures off the pitch, and the widespread coverage that his personal life received. His former Manchester United manager, Alex Ferguson, speculated in 2007 that Beckham's increasing celebrity status, in particular following his highly publicised relationship with his future wife Victoria, had actually had a negative impact on his playing career. In 2015, he claimed he had only coached four world class players throughout his time at United, excluding Beckham from the list, commenting: "I don't mean to demean or criticise any of the great or very good footballers who played for me during my 26-year career at United, but there were only four who were world class: Cantona, Giggs, Cristiano Ronaldo and Scholes."

Upon his departure to LA Galaxy, El País reflected on the dichotomy of Beckham's playing career and his status off the pitch, describing him as "the great paradox of world football", also adding:

He is the greatest icon on the planet and the cause of such delirium in the media and on the streets, the greatest catwalk model there is. And yet he has been an anti-diva. He was the most galactic of the galacticos off the pitch, but the greatest of earthlings when he walked on to the field.

Regarding Beckham's crossing ability, Rob Smyth of The Guardian said in 2014: "he was a great crosser and perhaps the greatest of all time", also noting that "he was a dead-ball specialist and also a dying-ball specialist: [...] his signature crosses in open play involved a ball that was barely moving, which allowed him to use the same technique as with corners and free-kicks." Nigel Reed of CBC Sports commented on Beckham's career and celebrity status, stating: "His brand is global, his appeal universal. He sparked debate and polarised opinion. But underneath the gloss he was, first and foremost, a very good footballer." He also added that while he felt that "Beckham was not the greatest player of his generation", he believed he had the ability to change games, describing him as "master of his art and a deadly opponent", whose "talent was only topped by his passion".

== Football-related business activities ==
=== David Beckham Academy ===
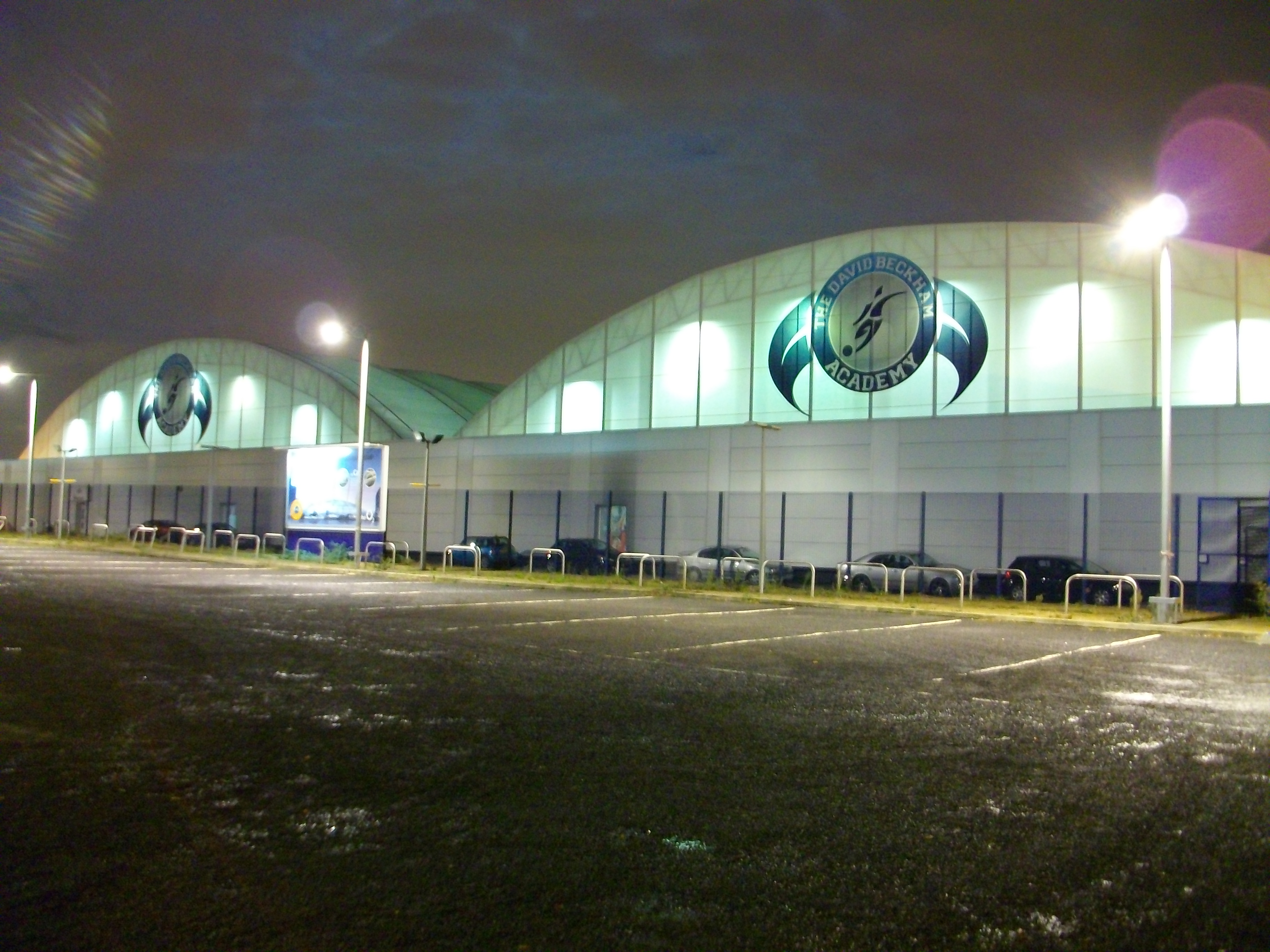
Beckham Academy in London

In 2005, Beckham founded the David Beckham Academy football school, operating in London and Los Angeles. It was announced in late 2009 that both would close.

=== Inter Miami ===
On 5 February 2014, MLS announced that Beckham had exercised his option to buy a MLS expansion team for US$25M, which he had received as part of the contract he signed with the LA Galaxy in 2007. The ownership group, led by Beckham, originally hoped the Miami-based team would begin play in 2016 or 2017. After delays getting a stadium deal completed, MLS announced in January 2018 that the team had been approved, and would likely begin play in 2020. The team name and crest were revealed on 5 September. Club Internacional de Futbol Miami – more commonly known as Inter Miami – is represented by a black crest with neon pink trimmings and herons whose legs clasp to form an "M" for Miami. The club made its MLS debut on 1 March 2020 with a 1–0 away loss to Los Angeles.

=== Salford City ===
In January 2019, it was announced that Beckham was set to join his Class of '92 teammates as part owner of English non-league club Salford City, taking 10% of the club previously held by Peter Lim, with the deal being subject to Football Association approval. On 31 January, the club announced that the FA had approved him to become a director of the club. In May 2025, Beckham and Gary Neville led a new consortium taking over Salford.

== Personal life ==
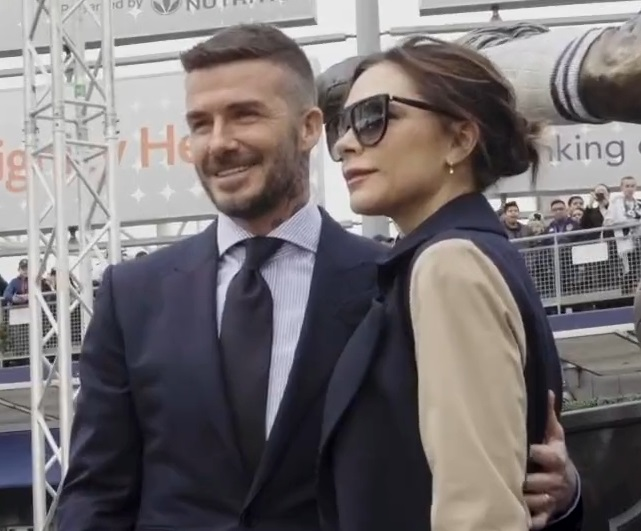
Beckham and wife Victoria in 2019

In 1997, Beckham started dating Victoria Adams after she attended a Manchester United match. She was famously known as "Posh Spice" of the pop music group Spice Girls, one of Britain's top pop groups at the time, and his team was also enjoying a great run of success. Their relationship instantly attracted a great deal of media attention. The couple were dubbed "Posh and Becks" by the media.

On 4 July 1999, they were married by the Bishop of Cork, Paul Colton, at Luttrellstown Castle in Ireland. Beckham's teammate Gary Neville was the best man, and the couple's four-month-old son, Brooklyn, was the ring bearer. The media were kept away from the ceremony, as the Beckhams had an exclusive deal with OK! Magazine, but newspapers were able to obtain photographs of them sitting on golden thrones. 437 staff were employed for the wedding reception, which was estimated to have cost £500,000.

David and Victoria have four children: sons Brooklyn Joseph (born 4 March 1999 in London), Romeo James (born 1 September 2002 in London) and Cruz David (born 20 February 2005 in Madrid), and daughter Harper Seven (born 10 July 2011 in Los Angeles). Elton John and David Furnish are reportedly the godparents to Brooklyn and Romeo Beckham; their godmother is Elizabeth Hurley. Cruz and Harper were baptised Catholic at Holy Trinity, Chipping Norton; among their godparents were Eva Longoria and Marc Anthony.

Beckham's three sons have all played football in the Arsenal academy. Brooklyn played football for Arsenal U16, through the end of the 2014–15 season. Like their father, Brooklyn and Romeo have both done modelling work and been named among GQ's best dressed British men. In his early Manchester United career, Beckham lived in a four-bedroom house in Worsley that he bought directly from the property developer as a 20-year-old in 1995. In 1999, shortly after his wedding, he and Victoria bought a country house set in 10 hectares (24 acres) in Sawbridgeworth, Hertfordshire, which the media nicknamed "Beckingham Palace". They sold the property in 2014. In 2024 they bought a property in Miami Beach for a record-setting US$72M.

Known by the nickname "Golden Balls", Beckham acquired the name from Victoria, who revealed it on national TV in 2008 while praising him for rebuilding his reputation after the 1998 World Cup. Beckham has obsessive–compulsive disorder (OCD), which he says makes him "have everything in a straight line or everything has to be in pairs." Victoria claimed: "If you open our fridge, it's all co-ordinated down either side. We've got three fridges – food in one, salad in another and drinks in the third. In the drinks one, everything is symmetrical. If there's three cans, he'll throw one away because it has to be an even number." A staunch monarchist, Beckham queued for 12 hours in September 2022 to see Queen Elizabeth II lying in state at Westminster Hall.

In 2004, various newspapers carried claims by Beckham's former personal assistant Rebecca Loos that she and Beckham had engaged in an extramarital affair. A week later, the Malaysian-born Australian model Sarah Marbeck claimed that she had slept with Beckham on two occasions. Beckham dismissed both claims as "ludicrous". A documentary called Beckham was released in 2023 on Netflix, 20 years after the alleged affair with Rebecca Loos took place. In it, Beckham did not deny the affair took place; instead, he stated how hard that general period was on his marriage.

Beckham has been actively involved in beekeeping, animal husbandry and farming since 2020 in the barn they bought in the Cotswolds in 2016. Since 2022, following Brooklyn Beckham's marriage to actress Nicola Peltz, reports of tension between David Beckham and his eldest son have appeared in the press. Some media outlets have described differences in lifestyle and family dynamics, as well as speculation about strained relations within the Beckham family.

Beckham was knighted by King Charles III at Windsor Castle in November 2025, in recognition of his services to sport and charitable causes. He received a star on the Hollywood Walk of Fame in June 2026, attended by his wife Victoria and three of their children in Los Angeles.

=== Legal issues ===
In September 2010, Beckham announced that he was making a court application against prostitute Irma Nici and several others over claims in the magazine In Touch that he had had sex with her. His court application was dismissed under US freedom of speech laws, and the magazine later accepted that the allegations against Beckham were untrue.

On 9 May 2019, at Bromley Magistrates Court, Beckham was banned from driving for six months. He previously pleaded guilty to using a mobile phone while driving on 21 November 2018. The court heard he was photographed by a member of the public holding a phone as he drove in "slowly moving" traffic. Beckham received six points on his licence, to add to the six he already had for previous speeding matters. He was also fined £750, and ordered to pay £100 in prosecution costs and a £75 surcharge fee.

=== Tattoos ===
As of 2021, Beckham has more than 65 tattoos covering a large part of his body, including tattoos on his hands, neck and head. There are names of his sons Romeo, Cruz and Brooklyn, and of his wife Victoria. His wife's name, tattooed on his left forearm, is in the Devanagari script (used for the Hindi and Sanskrit languages, among others) because Beckham thought it would be "tacky" to have it in English. However, this was misspelt as the equivalent of "Vhictoria". In his autobiography David Beckham: My Side, he said that the idea of having tattoos came to him in 1999 after his son Brooklyn was born, following a conversation on the subject of tattoos with Mel B (then Mel G) and her then-husband, Jimmy Gulzar. Beckham said: "When you see me, you see the tattoos. You see an expression of how I feel about Victoria and the boys. They're part of me."

He has several tattoos that pay tribute to his daughter, Harper, as well as several with religious significance. In 2018, Beckham added to his collection a tattoo of a solar system covering the left side of his scalp. Many of Beckham's tattoos were completed by the Manchester-based tattoo artist Louis Molloy.

=== Leaked emails ===
In 2015, a Portuguese company associated with Beckham's spokesman had their server hacked which contained personal emails from Beckham. Germany's Der Spiegel and France's L'Equipe published details of the hack, reporting how Beckham was angry at not being granted a knighthood in 2013, and that the Honours Committee was concerned about his tax affairs due to input from UK government department HMRC. Beckham's team stated some of the published emails were doctored, but they confirmed others as genuine.

== Celebrity status and commercial partnerships ==
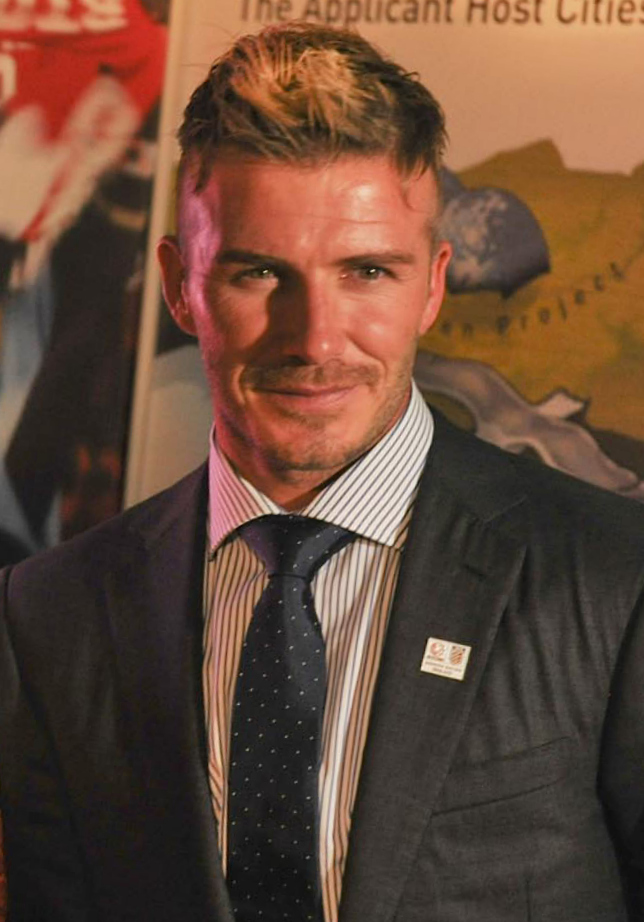
Beckham in Cape Town, South Africa, in 2009

Beckham's relationship and marriage to Victoria, famous in her own right as part of the Spice Girls, contributed to his celebrityhood beyond football. Beckham became known as a fashion icon, and together with Victoria, the couple became lucrative spokespeople sought after by clothing designers, health and fitness specialists, fashion magazines, and perfume and cosmetics manufacturers. Early endorsements included the British hair styling brand Brylcreem for £4M in 1997, which saw him appear in UK commercials. In 2002, he was hailed as the ultimate "metrosexual" by the man who invented the term and has been described as such by numerous other articles since. The various iconic hairstyles he sported throughout his career –including a buzz cut, a Mohawk, and a ponytail– were widely covered in the media.

While heterosexual, Beckham actively courted a gay fanbase and openly supported gay media, preferring to give interviews to publications that supported the LGBTQ community. He came to be called a "gay icon" – a term he embraces – for his popularity among the gay community. This honorific has been in dispute, however, since Beckham signed a deal with Qatar (which persecutes LGBT people) to become a brand ambassador for the 2022 FIFA World Cup. In a statement, Beckham said that the World Cup will be "[a platform for] progress, inclusivity and tolerance".

The Beckhams were paid US$13.7 million in 2007 to launch his fragrance line in the US. In the world of fashion, David has appeared on the covers of many magazines. US covers have included the men's magazine Details, and with Victoria for the August 2007 issue of W. According to Google, "David Beckham" was searched for more than any other sports topic on their site in 2003 and 2004. According to Ask Jeeves, Beckham ranked third among subjects most searched for by British users of that site in the first decade of the 2000s.

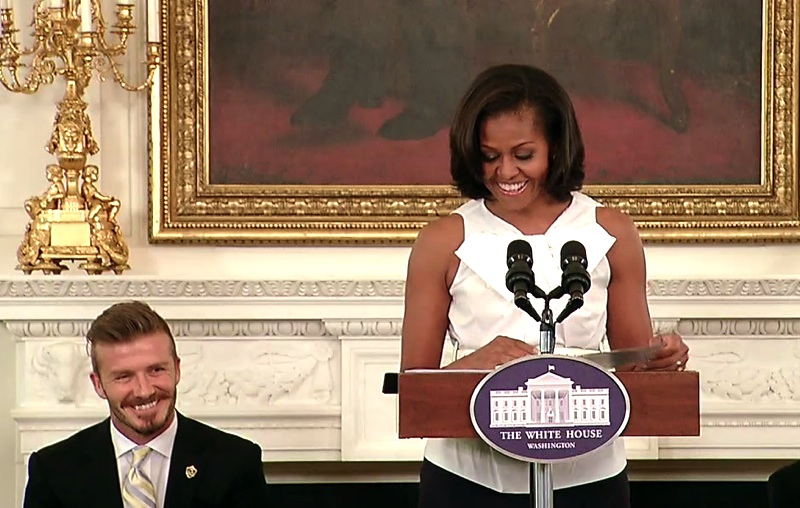
Beckham with United States First Lady Michelle Obama at the White House, 15 March 2012

Upon their arrival in Los Angeles on 12 July 2007, the night before Beckham's formal introduction, Los Angeles International Airport was filled with paparazzi and news reporters. On the next night, Victoria appeared on The Tonight Show with Jay Leno to talk about their move to LA and her NBC TV show Victoria Beckham: Coming to America. On 22 July, a private welcoming party was held for the couple at the Museum of Contemporary Art, Los Angeles. A-list celebrities attending included Steven Spielberg, Jim Carrey, George Clooney, Tom Cruise, Katie Holmes, Will Smith, Jada Pinkett Smith, and Oprah Winfrey.

Beckham's many endorsement deals make him one of the most recognizable athletes throughout the world. Having worn Adidas football boots from the start of his career (notably Adidas Predator), in 2003 he signed a US$160M lifetime contract with Adidas, earning nearly half the money upfront, and would continue to earn percentages of profits on all of his branded Adidas products. His 2004 Adidas television commercial "Kicking it", in which he appears with England Rugby World Cup winner Jonny Wilkinson, was voted among the best British commercials of the year, and featured as one of the Great Ads of the 21st Century in Channel 4's 2004 update of The 100 Greatest TV Ads. He had a 10-year collaboration with PepsiCo that expired in 2009. He has also promoted The Walt Disney Company theme parks. In April 2021, he became a global ambassador for Maserati. In 2023, as part of Maserati's new personalisation programme, "Fuoriserie Essentials", the brand unveiled its first collection with Beckham.

Beckham has several eponymous video games, including Go! Go! Beckham! Adventure on Soccer Island, a platform game for the Game Boy Advance, and David Beckham Soccer, a football game for a number of platforms, and he was brand ambassador for exercise video game EA Sports Active 2. Beckham featured in EA Sports' FIFA video game series; he was on the cover for the UK edition of FIFA 98. During his playing career (which ended in May 2013), Beckham generated an estimated £1 billion in shirt and boot sales. In 2006, Lloyd's of London insured his legs for £100M. In 2026, Beckham was added to Fortnite.

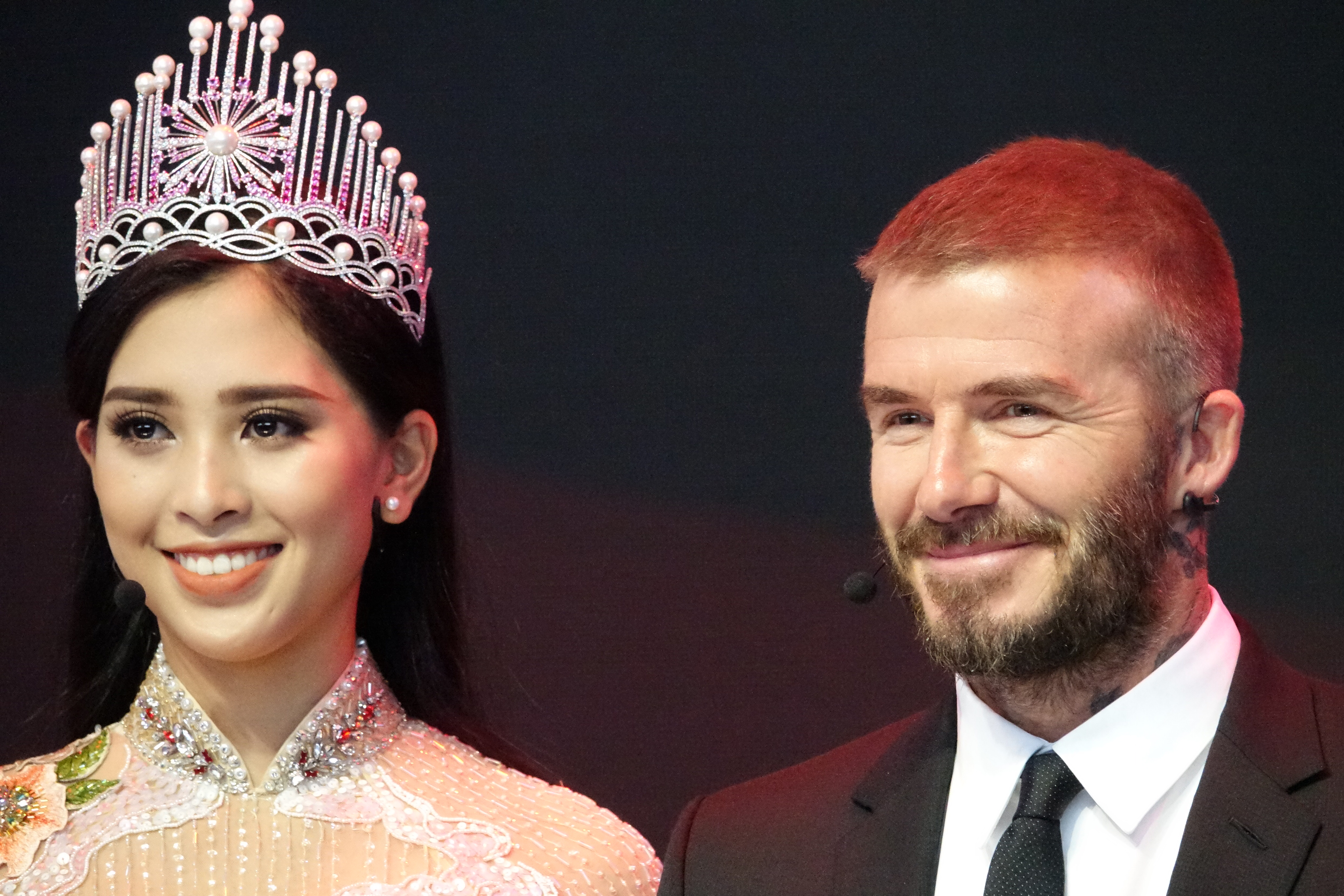
Beckham with Miss Vietnam Trần Tiểu Vy at the Paris Motor Show 2018

Beckham played a critical part in bringing the Olympics to London in 2012, travelling with the British delegation to Singapore in 2005 for the host city selection. At the 2008 Beijing Olympics closing ceremony, Beckham, Jimmy Page, and Leona Lewis represented Britain during the handover segment for the 2012 Olympics. Beckham rode a London double-decker bus into the stadium and Page and Lewis performed "Whole Lotta Love". He featured at the 2012 Summer Olympics opening ceremony, carrying the Olympic flame to the stadium by speedboat.

Beckham visited Afghanistan in May 2010 for a morale-boosting visit to British troops fighting the Taliban insurgency. The appearance of Beckham as well as British Foreign Secretary William Hague and Defence Secretary Liam Fox was believed to have prompted a Taliban attack on Kandahar airfield.

Chinese authorities appointed Beckham as global ambassador for Chinese football in March 2013. After numerous officials had been banned for match-fixing, and the Chinese Super League had failed to retain the services of well-known international names, Beckham's role was to help improve the image of the game and raise its profile both in China and abroad.

From 14 July 2013, Beckham appeared in adverts for BSkyB, advertising their Sky Sports coverage via the Sky Go app. In January 2014, Beckham appeared on Late Night with Jimmy Fallon on NBC in the US, and in March he made a guest appearance in the BBC's Sport Relief special of Only Fools and Horses. He was named one of GQ's 50 best dressed British men in 2015.

In March 2015, Beckham had the third highest social media rank in the world among sportspeople, behind Cristiano Ronaldo and Lionel Messi, with more than 52 million Facebook fans. He also has more than 80 million Instagram followers, the fifth highest for a footballer, behind Cristiano Ronaldo, Messi, Neymar and Kylian Mbappé, and the second most for a person from the UK, after Dua Lipa.

During the 2016 EU referendum, Beckham voiced his opposition to Brexit, stating: "For our children and their children we should be facing the problems of the world together and not alone. For these reasons, I am voting to remain." Beckham was announced as the new Ambassadorial president of the British Fashion Council on 11 May 2018. Prior to the June 2018 vote by FIFA member nations for selecting the hosts of the 2026 FIFA World Cup, Beckham endorsed the North American bid (Canada, Mexico, and the United States).

Beckham's former club LA Galaxy unveiled a statue of him outside of their stadium in March 2019, the first of its kind in the MLS. In June 2020, Beckham became a minority owner of the London-based esports organisation Guild Esports. In November 2020, EA Sports had an agreement with Beckham to feature him in FIFA 21, in which he would earn £40M from a three-year deal. In June 2021, Beckham bought 10% stake of vehicle electrification firm, Lunaz.

According to Sunday Times Rich List 2026, Beckham is the UK's first billionaire sportsman.

== Philanthropy ==
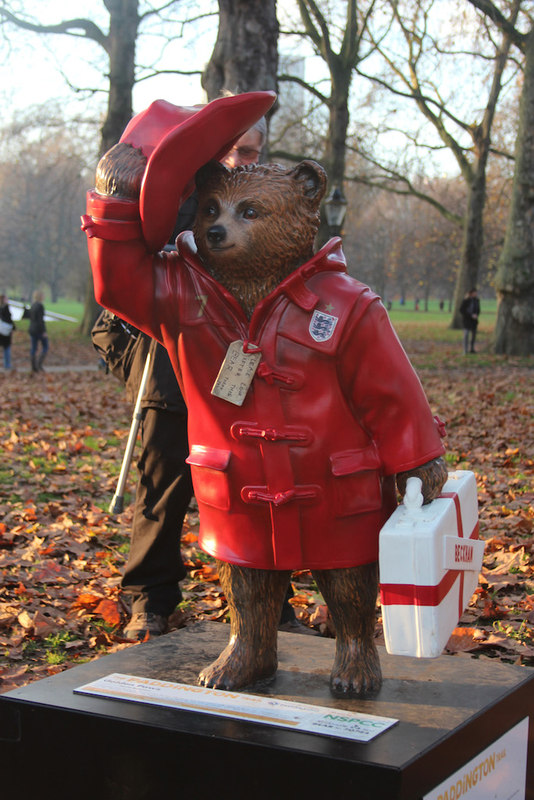
Beckham's England national football team-themed Paddington Bear statue – "Golden Paws" – in London, auctioned to raise funds for the NSPCC

In 2013, Beckham donated all his £3.4M salary from Paris Saint-Germain to two children's charities in France. He is a founding member of the Malaria No More UK Leadership Council and helped launch the charity in 2009 with Andy Murray at Wembley Stadium. In November 2014, Beckham designed a Paddington Bear statue, one of fifty created by various celebrities which were located around London prior to the release of the film Paddington. The statues were auctioned to raise funds for the National Society for the Prevention of Cruelty to Children.

== Appearances in films ==
"We may be a small country, but we're a great one, too. The country of Shakespeare, Churchill, the Beatles, Sean Connery, Harry Potter. David Beckham's right foot. David Beckham's left foot, come to that."

— Hugh Grant's character in Love Actually (2003).

Beckham never personally appeared in the 2002 film Bend It Like Beckham, except in archive footage. He and his wife wanted to make cameo appearances, but scheduling proved difficult, so the director used lookalike Andy Harmer instead.

Beckham makes a cameo appearance with Zinedine Zidane and Raúl, in the 2005 film Goal!. Harmer doubled for him in the party scene. Beckham himself appears in the sequel, Goal II: Living the Dream, in a larger role, when the film's lead character gets transferred to Real Madrid. The story centres on the Real Madrid team, with other Madrid players also appearing on and off the pitch, alongside the fictional characters. Through the use of stock footage from the 2006 FIFA World Cup, Beckham appeared in Goal III: Taking on the World, released straight to DVD on 15 June 2009.

In 2013, British magazine Marketing Week wrote of Beckham's "somewhat limited acting skills". Through his friendship with director Guy Ritchie, he has made two film cameo appearances: as a projectionist in The Man from U.N.C.L.E., and as Trigger in King Arthur: Legend of the Sword. Artist Sam Taylor-Johnson recorded Beckham sleeping in a hotel room in Madrid in January 2004 following a morning's training session with Real Madrid. The film was commissioned by the National Portrait Gallery in London.

== Filmography ==
Television
Year	Title	Role	Notes
2012	Hell's Kitchen	Himself	Episode: "10 Chefs Compete"
2014	"Beckham in Peckham"	Himself	Only Fools and Horses entry for Sport Relief 2014
2018	King Arthur: Legend of the Sword	Trigger	A guard who oversees the prisoners that attempt to pull Excalibur from the stone.
2020	Modern Family	Himself	Episode: "The Prescott"
2023	Beckham	Himself	4 episodes on Netflix

== Career statistics ==
=== Club ===
Appearances and goals by club, season and competition
Club	Season	League			National cup (Note: Includes FA Cup, Copa del Rey, Coppa Italia, Coupe de France)		League cup (Note: Includes Football League Cup)		Continental		Other		Total	
Club	Season	Division	Apps	Goals	Apps	Goals	Apps	Goals	Apps	Goals	Apps	Goals	Apps	Goals
Manchester United	1992–93	Premier League	0	0	0	0	1	0	0	0	–		1	0
Manchester United	1993–94	Premier League	0	0	0	0	0	0	0	0	0	0	0	0
Manchester United	1994–95	Premier League	4	0	2	0	3	0	1 (Note: Appearances in UEFA Champions League)	1	0	0	10	1
Manchester United	1995–96	Premier League	33	7	3	1	2	0	2 (Note: Appearances in UEFA Cup)	0	–		40	8
Manchester United	1996–97	Premier League	36	8	2	1	0	0	10	2	1 (Note: Appearance in FA Charity Shield)	1	49	12
Manchester United	1997–98	Premier League	37	9	4	2	0	0	8	0	1	0	50	11
Manchester United	1998–99	Premier League	34	6	7	1	1	0	12	2	1	0	55	9
Manchester United	1999–2000	Premier League	31	6	–		0	0	12	2	5 (Note: One appearance in UEFA Super Cup, one appearance in Intercontinental Cup, three appearances in FIFA Club World Championship)	0	48	8
Manchester United	2000–01	Premier League	31	9	2	0	0	0	12	0	1	0	46	9
Manchester United	2001–02	Premier League	28	11	1	0	0	0	13	5	1	0	43	16
Manchester United	2002–03	Premier League	31	6	3	1	5	1	13	3	–		52	11
Manchester United	Total		265	62	24	6	12	1	83	15	10	1	394	85
Preston North End (loan)	1994–95	Third Division	5	2	0	0	0	0	–		0	0	5	2
Real Madrid	2003–04	La Liga	32	3	5	2	–		7	1	2 (Note: Appearances in Supercopa de España)	1	46	7
Real Madrid	2004–05	La Liga	30	4	0	0	–		8	0	–		38	4
Real Madrid	2005–06	La Liga	31	3	6	1	–		7	1	–		44	5
Real Madrid	2006–07	La Liga	23	3	2	1	–		6	0	–		31	4
Real Madrid	Total		116	13	13	4	–		28	2	2	1	159	20
LA Galaxy	2007	Major League Soccer	5	0	0	0	–		–		2 (Note: Appearances in North American SuperLiga)	1	7	1
LA Galaxy	2008	Major League Soccer	25	5	0	0	–		–		0	0	25	5
LA Galaxy	2009	Major League Soccer	11	2	0	0	–		–		4 (Note: Appearances in MLS Cup Playoffs)	0	15	2
LA Galaxy	2010	Major League Soccer	7	2	0	0	–		–		3	0	10	2
LA Galaxy	2011	Major League Soccer	26	2	0	0	–		4 (Note: Appearance in CONCACAF Champions League)	0	4	0	34	2
LA Galaxy	2012	Major League Soccer	24	7	0	0	–		3 (Note: Appearance in CONCACAF Champions League)	1	6	0	33	8
LA Galaxy	Total		98	18	0	0	–		7	1	19	1	124	20
AC Milan (loan)	2008–09	Serie A	18	2	0	0	–		2	0	–		20	2
AC Milan (loan)	2009–10	Serie A	11	0	0	0	–		2	0	–		13	0
AC Milan (loan)	Total		29	2	0	0	–		4	0	–		33	2
Paris Saint-Germain	2012–13	Ligue 1	10	0	2	0	–		2	0	–		14	0
Career total			523	97	39	10	12	1	124	18	31	3	729	129

=== International ===
Appearances and goals by national team and year
National team	Year	Apps	Goals
England	1996	3	0
England	1997	9	0
England	1998	8	1
England	1999	7	0
England	2000	10	0
England	2001	10	5
England	2002	9	3
England	2003	9	4
England	2004	12	2
England	2005	9	1
England	2006	8	1
England	2007	5	0
England	2008	8	0
England	2009	8	0
Total		115	17

Scores and results list England's goal tally first, score column indicates score after each Beckham goal

List of international goals scored by David Beckham
No.	Date	Venue	Cap	Opponent	Score	Result	Competition
1	26 June 1998	Stade Bollaert-Delelis, Lens, France	17	Colombia	2–0	2–0	1998 FIFA World Cup
2	24 March 2001	Anfield, Liverpool, England	39	Finland	2–1	2–1	2002 FIFA World Cup qualification
3	25 May 2001	Pride Park, Derby, England	41	Mexico	3–0	4–0	Friendly
4	6 June 2001	Olympic Stadium, Athens, Greece	42	Greece	2–0	2–0	2002 FIFA World Cup qualification
5	6 October 2001	Old Trafford, Manchester, England	46	Greece	2–2	2–2	2002 FIFA World Cup qualification
6	10 November 2001	Old Trafford, Manchester, England	47	Sweden	1–0	1–1	Friendly
7	7 June 2002	Sapporo Dome, Sapporo, Japan	51	Argentina	1–0	1–0	2002 FIFA World Cup
8	12 October 2002	Tehelné pole, Bratislava, Slovakia	55	Slovakia	1–1	2–1	UEFA Euro 2004 qualifying
9	16 October 2002	St Mary's Stadium, Southampton, England	56	North Macedonia	1–1	2–2	UEFA Euro 2004 qualifying
10	29 March 2003	Rheinpark Stadion, Vaduz, Liechtenstein	58	Liechtenstein	2–0	2–0	UEFA Euro 2004 qualifying
11	2 April 2003	Stadium of Light, Sunderland, England	59	Turkey	2–0	2–0	UEFA Euro 2004 qualifying
12	20 August 2003	Portman Road, Ipswich, England	61	Croatia	1–0	3–1	Friendly
13	6 September 2003	Skopje City Stadium, Skopje, North Macedonia	62	North Macedonia	2–1	2–1	UEFA Euro 2004 qualifying
14	18 August 2004	St James' Park, Newcastle upon Tyne, England	73	Ukraine	1–0	3–0	Friendly
15	9 October 2004	Old Trafford, Manchester, England	76	Wales	2–0	2–0	2006 FIFA World Cup qualification
16	30 March 2005	St James' Park, Newcastle upon Tyne, England	80	Azerbaijan	2–0	2–0	2006 FIFA World Cup qualification
17	25 June 2006	Gottlieb-Daimler-Stadion, Stuttgart, Germany	93	Ecuador	1–0	1–0	2006 FIFA World Cup

== Honours ==
Manchester United

- Premier League: 1995–96, 1996–97, 1998–99, 1999–2000, 2000–01, 2002–03
- FA Cup: 1995–96, 1998–99
- FA Charity Shield: 1996, 1997
- UEFA Champions League: 1998–99
- Intercontinental Cup: 1999

Real Madrid

- La Liga: 2006–07
- Supercopa de España: 2003

LA Galaxy

- MLS Cup: 2011, 2012
- Supporters' Shield: 2010, 2011

Paris Saint-Germain

- Ligue 1: 2012–13

England

- Tournoi de France: 1997

Individual

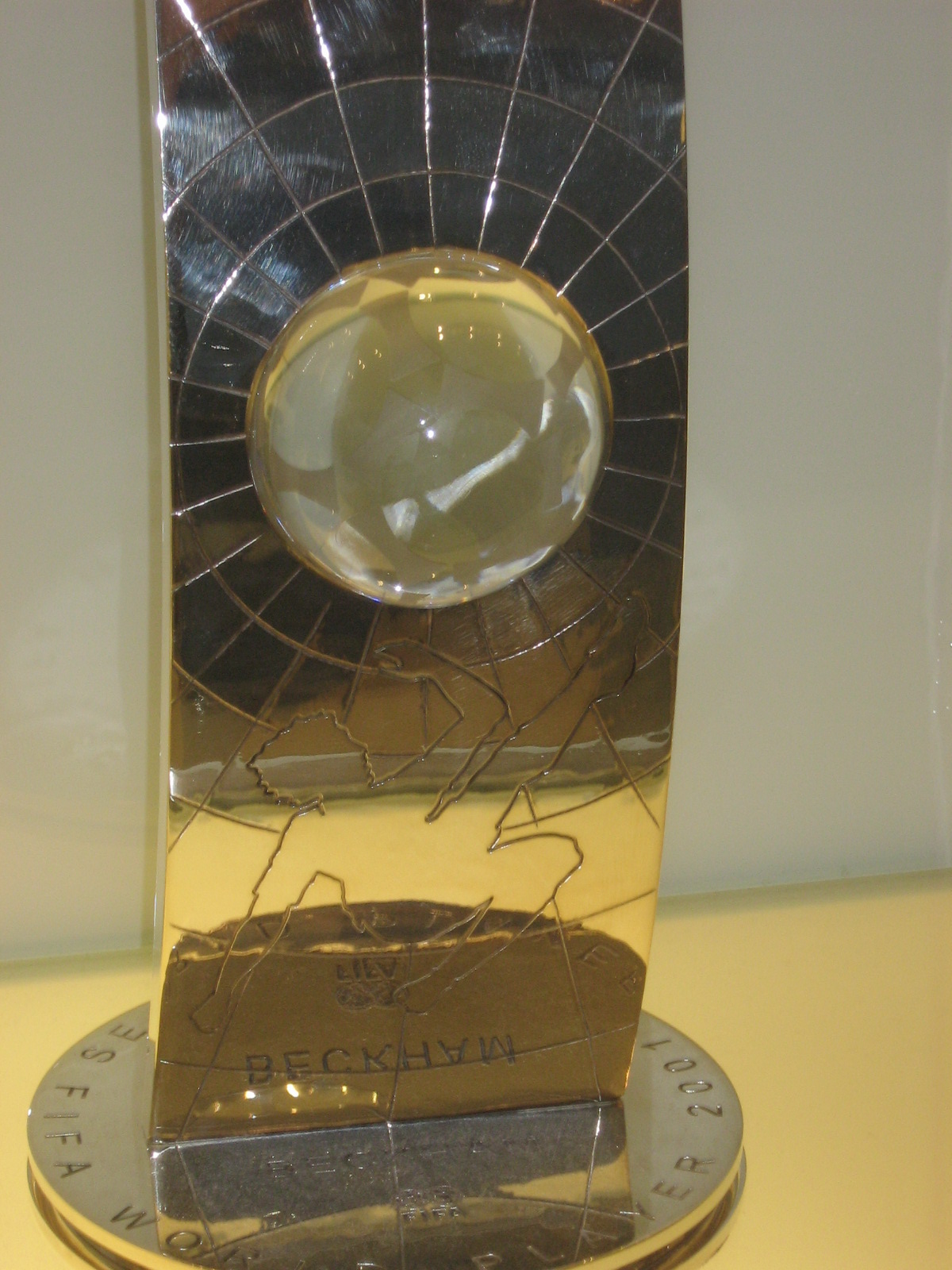
Beckham's 2001 FIFA World Player of the Year runner-up trophy

- Ballon d'Or runner-up: 1999
- FIFA World Player of the Year silver award: 1999, 2001
- Most assists in the Premier League: 1997–98, 1999–2000 (shared), 2000–01
- Premier League Player of the Month: August 1996
- PFA Young Player of the Year: 1996–97
- FWA Tribute Award: 2008
- Sir Matt Busby Player of the Year: 1996–97
- England Player of the Year: 2003
- ESM Team of the Year: 1998–99
- UEFA Club Footballer of the Year: 1998–99
- UEFA Club Midfielder of the Year: 1998–99
- UEFA Team of the Year: 2001, 2003
- Premier League 10 Seasons Awards (1992–93 to 2001–02):
  - Domestic & Overall Team of the Decade
  - Goal of the Decade (vs. Wimbledon, 17 August 1996)
- BBC Sports Personality of the Year: 2001
- BBC Sports Personality of the Year Lifetime Achievement Award: 2010
- Real Madrid Player of the Year: 2005–06
- PFA Team of the Year: 1996–97 Premier League, 1997–98 Premier League, 1998–99 Premier League, 1999–2000 Premier League
- FIFA 100
- ESPY Awards:
  - Best Male Soccer Player: 2004
  - Best MLS Player: 2008, 2012
- English Football Hall of Fame: 2008
- Premier League Hall of Fame: 2021
- MLS Best XI: 2011
- MLS All-Star Game: 2008, 2011, 2012
- MLS Comeback Player of the Year Award: 2011
- PFA Team of the Century (1997–2007): 2007
- International Federation of Football History & Statistics (IFFHS) Legends
- UEFA President's Award: 2018
- FIFA World Cup Fans' All-Star Team: 2002

Orders and special awards

- United Nations Children's Fund (UNICEF) Goodwill Ambassador, 2005–present
- "Britain's Greatest Ambassador" – 100 Greatest Britons awards
- The Celebrity 100, number 15 – Forbes, 2007
- Number 1 on the list of the 40 most influential men under the age of 40 in the UK – Arena, 2007
- Time 100, 2008
- Gold Blue Peter badge winner, 2001
- Do Something Athlete Award, 2011

Orders

- Officer of the Order of the British Empire by Queen Elizabeth II: 2003
- Knight Bachelor by King Charles III: 2025

Records

- First Englishman to win league titles in four countries (England, Spain, United States, France)
- First England player to score at three FIFA World Cups
- First British footballer to play 100 UEFA Champions League games
- Most free-kicks scored in the Premier League: 18
- Most free-kicks scored in a Premier League season: 5 in 2000-01

== See also ==
- List of footballers with 100 or more UEFA Champions League appearances
- List of men's footballers with 100 or more international caps
- Designated Player Rule (Beckham Rule)
- List of select Jewish footballers
- Beckham law, a Spanish tax decree which is nick-named after Beckham as he was one of the first people to make use of it
