= Love You More (film) =

- Directed by: Sam Taylor-Wood
- Written by: Patrick Marber
- Produced by: Caroline Harvey; Patrick Marber; Anthony Minghella; Adrian Sturges; Sam Taylor Wood
- Starring: Harry Treadaway; Andrea Riseborough; Samuel Roukin; Paul Ritter; Pete Shelley; Harriet Ashcroft; Alex Kelly
- Cinematography: Seamus McGarvey
- Edited by: Lisa Gunning
- Release date: 5 February 2008
- Running time: 15 minutes
- Country: United Kingdom
- Language: English

Love You More is a 2008 British drama short film directed by Sam Taylor-Wood and written by Patrick Marber. It was screened in Main Competition for the Palme d'Or at the 2008 Cannes Film Festival. The film includes two songs by Buzzcocks and features a cameo appearance by the band's lead singer Pete Shelley as a customer at a record store.
