= Sam Taylor-Johnson =

British film director, artist and photographer (born 1967)

Sam Taylor-Johnson OBE
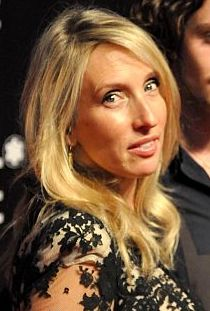
- Taylor-Johnson in September 2010
- Born: Samantha Louise Taylor-Wood; 4 March 1967 (age 59); London, England
- Education: Beacon Community College; Goldsmiths, University of London
- Occupation: Filmmaker
- Years active: 1993–present
- Spouses: Jay Jopling (m. 1997; div. 2008); Aaron Johnson (m. 2012)
- Children: 4

Samantha Louise Taylor-Johnson (née Taylor-Wood; born 4 March 1967) is a British filmmaker. Her directorial feature film debut was 2009's Nowhere Boy, a film based on the childhood experiences of the Beatles' singer and songwriter John Lennon. She is one of a group of artists known as the Young British Artists.

== Early life ==
Samantha Taylor-Wood was born in Croydon, London. Her father, David, left the family when she was nine. Her mother, Geraldine, is a yoga teacher and astrologist. She has a younger sister, Ashley, and a maternal half-brother, Kristian.

Taylor-Wood grew up near Streatham Common in south London until her parents' divorce. The family then moved into an old schoolhouse in Jarvis Brook in East Sussex, and Samantha went to Beacon Community College. She later attended Goldsmiths, University of London.

== Career ==
=== Fine art ===
Taylor-Johnson began exhibiting fine-art photography in the early 1990s. One collaboration with Henry Bond, titled 26 October 1993, featured Bond and Taylor-Johnson reprising the roles of Yoko Ono and John Lennon in a pastiche of the photo-portrait made by photographer Annie Leibovitz—a few hours before Lennon was assassinated, in 1980.

In 1994, she exhibited a multi-screen video work titled Killing Time, in which four people mimed to an opera score. From that point multi-screen video works became the main focus of her work. Beginning with the video works Travesty of a Mockery and Pent-Up in 1996. One of Taylor-Johnson's first United Kingdom solo shows was held at the Chisenhale Gallery, east London, in September–October 1996. She was nominated for the annual Turner Prize in 1998. She won the Illy Café Prize for Most Promising Young Artist at the 1997 Venice Biennale.

In 2000, she created a wraparound photomural around scaffolding of the London department store Selfridges while it was being restored; the mural featured 21 cultural icons including Elton John, musician Alex James, and actors Richard E. Grant and Ray Winstone. The poses of the figures referenced famous works of art from the past and recent movies. The following year, she photographed the cover and sleeve for John's 2001 album Songs From the West Coast.

In 2002, Taylor-Johnson was commissioned by the National Portrait Gallery to make David, a video portrait of David Beckham—whom she depicted sleeping. She is perhaps best known for her work entitled 'Crying Men' which features many of Hollywood's glitterati crying, including Robin Williams, Sean Penn, Laurence Fishburne and Paul Newman. In 2006, she had a survey exhibition at the Baltic Centre for Contemporary Art in Gateshead, England.

2014 saw a new photographic exhibition by Taylor-Johnson, of the private apartment of Mademoiselle Chanel at The Saatchi Gallery. Entitled ‘Second Floor,' the series of 34 photographs captured the private rooms of Coco Chanel at 31 Rue Cambon in Paris.

=== Nowhere Boy ===
In August 2008, she was chosen to direct Nowhere Boy, a biopic about the childhood of John Lennon. The 53rd annual London Film Festival screened the film as its closing presentation on 29 October 2009. The film was released in the UK on Boxing Day in 2009 to positive reviews. She was nominated for a BAFTA award on 21 January 2010. She spoke about her experience directing the film in September 2010.

=== Other music, film and television work ===
In her 2004 film installation "Strings" at White Cube, ballet dancer Ivan Putrov was suspended by a harness above four musicians playing the slow movement from Tchaikovsky's Second String Quartet, filmed in the Crush Bar of the Royal Opera House. In 2006, she contributed the short film Death Valley to the British version of Destricted. In July 2006 she was appointed as a Governor of the British Film Institute.

In 2008, she directed a short film Love You More, written by Patrick Marber and produced by Anthony Minghella. The film includes two songs by the Buzzcocks and features a cameo appearance by the band's lead singer Pete Shelley. In February 2009, Taylor-Wood, collaborating with Sky Arts chose to interpret "Vesti la giubba" from Pagliacci.

In 2011, she directed the R.E.M. music video "Überlin". The clip starred her then-fiancé Aaron Johnson, who "throws some kung-fu kicks, attempts some pirouettes, prances, punches the air, chicken walks, tries out some bunny impressions, and, at one point, fondles his bottom".

In September 2011, she collaborated with Solange Azagury-Partridge on the short film Daydream. This was aired to support the launch of Azagury-Partridge's new jewellery collection, 24:7. Under the direction of Taylor-Wood, Liberty Ross plays a beautiful woman in her bedroom, bejewelled by her lover, played by JJ Feild. The original music was composed by Oscar winner Atticus Ross, and the director of photography was John Mathieson.

Taylor-Johnson directed the film adaptation of E. L. James' erotic novel, Fifty Shades of Grey, made by Universal Pictures and Focus Features. Taylor-Johnson was in pole position to direct Fifty Shades Darker (the sequel to Fifty Shades of Grey), but decided to walk away from the much-discussed franchise after she was involved in a number of disagreements with author E.L. James. In June 2017, Taylor-Johnson said that she regretted directing the first film.

In July 2022, it was announced that the feature film Back to Black, a biopic based on the life and career of British singer Amy Winehouse, would be directed by Taylor-Johnson. Filming for the project commenced in January 2023 in London.

== Personal life ==
Taylor-Johnson has had cancer twice. In December 1997, at age 30, she was treated for colon cancer. In 2000, she was diagnosed with breast cancer.

Taylor-Johnson practices yoga and Transcendental Meditation, of which she says, "I wouldn't be able to survive everything without the meditation that I do. It's what I think has made me able to cope with the madness".

Taylor-Johnson was appointed Officer of the Order of the British Empire (OBE) in the 2011 Birthday Honours for services to the arts.

=== Marriages and children ===
She married art dealer and gallerist Jay Jopling in 1997; they have two daughters together, born in April 1997 and September 2006. In September 2008, the couple announced that they were separating amicably after 11 years of marriage.

She began a relationship with actor Aaron Johnson soon after filming wrapped on the 2009 set of Nowhere Boy. They met when Johnson auditioned for the role of John Lennon in Nowhere Boy in late 2008, when he was 18 (he was born in 1990) and she was a 41 year old mother of two.

The couple announced their engagement at the film's premiere in October 2009. They married at Babington House, Somerset, on 21 June 2012 and both took the surname Taylor-Johnson. They have two daughters together, born on 7 July 2010 and on 18 January 2012. They split time between Los Angeles, California, United States, and a farm near Bruton in Somerset.

== Discography ==
She has released three songs in collaboration with Pet Shop Boys:

- 1999: "Je t'aime... moi non plus" included in compilation book/album We Love You (Candy Records)
- 2003: "Love to Love You Baby" under the pseudonym Kiki Kokova (Lucky Kunst)
- 2008: "I'm in Love with a German Film Star" (Kompakt)

== Filmography ==
Short film

Year	Title	Notes
2006	Death Valley	Segment of Destricted (Also writer)
2008	Love You More	Also producer
2011	James Bond Supports International Women's Day	

Feature film

Year	Title	Director	Producer	Writer
2009	Nowhere Boy	Yes	No	No
2015	Fifty Shades of Grey	Yes	No	No
2018	A Million Little Pieces	Yes	Yes	Yes
2024	Back to Black	Yes	Executive	No

Television

Year	Title	Director	Executive Producer	Notes
2017	Gypsy	Yes	Yes	2 episodes
2021	Solos	Yes	Yes	2 episodes
2023	Hunters	Yes	No	1 episode
