= David (2004 film) =

Video art work by Sam Taylor-Johnson

David is a 2004 video art work by Sam Taylor-Johnson that depicts the footballer David Beckham asleep.

The work is 107 minutes in length. It was filmed in a hotel room in Madrid in January 2004 following Beckham's morning training session with Real Madrid CF. Beckham is shown sleeping throughout the duration of the video, which was filmed in a single take. His hand rests under his head which rests on a white pillow. He stirs occasionally and reveals "a hint of shoulder tattoo, a nipple or a touch of lower torso".

David was commissioned by the National Portrait Gallery in London in 2004. It was created with support from JP Morgan bank through the gallery's Fund for New Commissions. It was unveiled at the National Portrait Gallery in April 2004.

Taylor-Johnson was inspired by Michelangelo's Allegory of Night, Andy Warhol's 1964 film Sleep which featured John Giorno, and Peter Jackson's 2001 film "The Fellowship of the Ring", which she had seen days prior and "really liked".

Reviewing the work for The Guardian, Charlotte Higgins described it as "Somewhat less eventful than the average Real Madrid match" but "unashamedly beautiful" writing that his "limbs and face are warmly lit, looming out of a Caravaggio-esque gloom. The curves of his musculature and honeyed tone of his skin are sensuously conveyed. This is a David as physically perfect as Michelangelo's".

From January to March 2020 it was displayed at the Ultrasound Department of Whipps Cross University Hospital in Leytonstone, East London. This was the hospital where Beckham was born on 2 May 1975.
