= Liam Gillick =

English artist (born 1964)

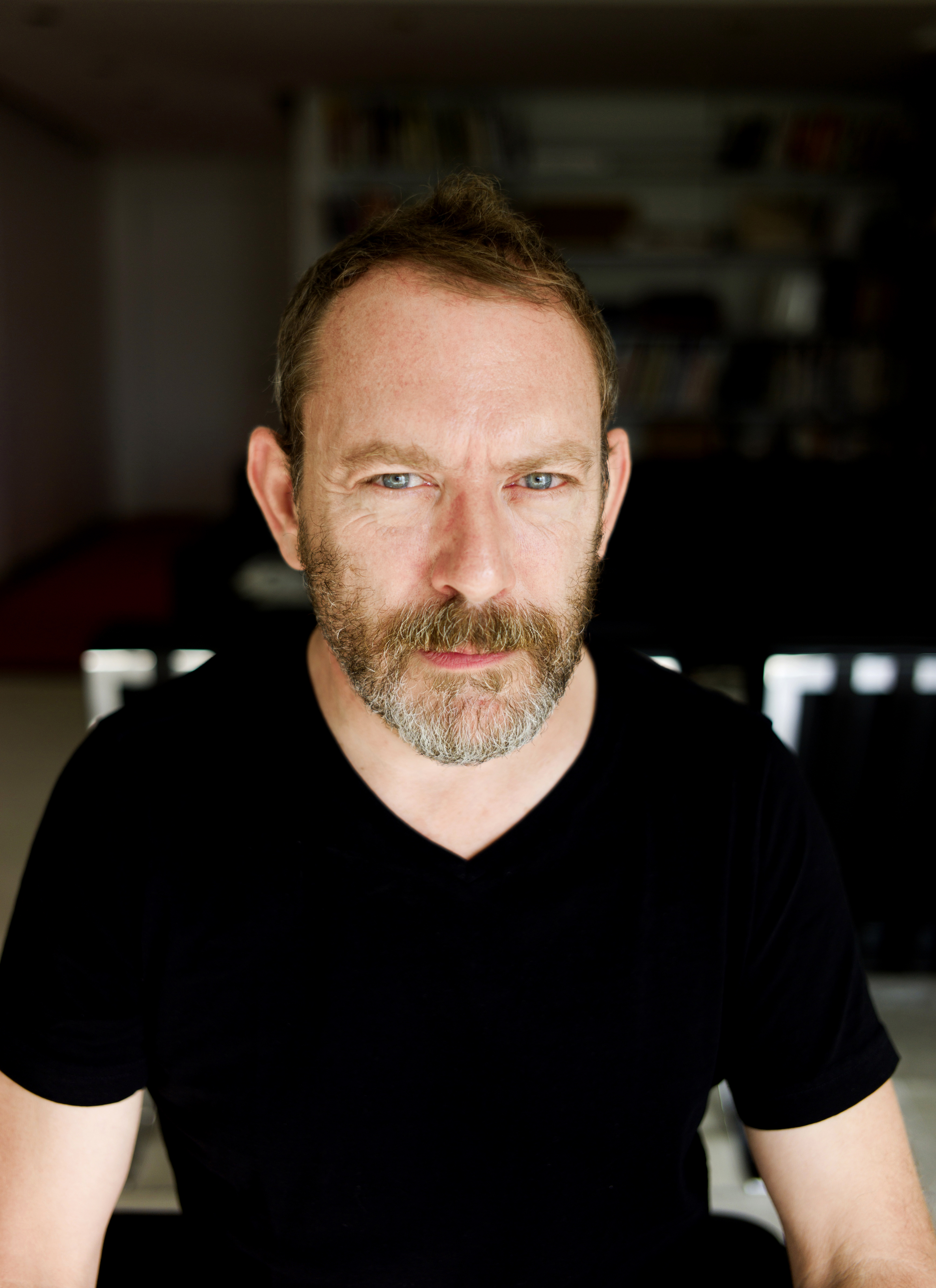
- Born: 1964 (age 61–62); Aylesbury, Buckinghamshire, England
- Education: Goldsmiths
- Known for: Conceptual art, installation art
- Movement: Young British Artists; Relational art
- Website: www.liamgillick.info

Liam Gillick (born 1964) is a British artist. In the 1990s he was one of the informal Young British Artists group; like many of them, he took a degree in fine art from Goldsmiths' College, in London. He was among the artists included in the Traffic exhibition at the Musée d'art contemporain de Bordeaux in Bordeaux in 1996, where Nicolas Bourriaud's concept of relationality was first proposed. Gillick lives in New York.

== Life and career ==
Liam Gillick graduated from Goldsmiths College in 1987 with a degree in fine art. In 1989 he mounted his first solo gallery exhibition, 84 Diagrams, through Karsten Schubert in London. Gillick has exhibited in galleries and institutions in Europe and the United States, many of which have been collaborative projects with other artists, architects, designers and writers.

In 1991, together with art collector, and co-publisher of Art Monthly, Jack Wendler, Gillick founded the limited editions and publishing company G-W Press. The company produced limited editions by artists including Jeremy Deller and Anya Gallaccio.

In the early 1990s Gillick was a member of the band Soho and is credited with providing samples during their live performances.

Together with Damien Hirst, Sarah Lucas, Angela Bulloch and Henry Bond, he was "the earliest of the YBAs" – the Young British Artists who dominated British art during the 1990s.

Gillick was included in the 1996 exhibition Traffic, curated by Nicholas Bourriaud, which first introduced the term Relational Aesthetics.

In 2002, Gillick was selected to produce artworks for the canopy, the glass facade, the kiosks, the entrance ikon, and the vitrines, of the then-recently completed Home Office building, a United Kingdom government department, at Marsham Street, London.

In 2002, Gillick was nominated for the annual British Turner Prize. In the Winter 2006 edition of October (No. 115) Gillick's response to Claire Bishop's October article "Antagonism and Relational Aesthetics", was published as "Contingent Factors: A Response to Claire Bishop's 'Antagonism and Relational Aesthetics'."

Gillick has contributed written articles to fine art journals Frieze and Artforum.

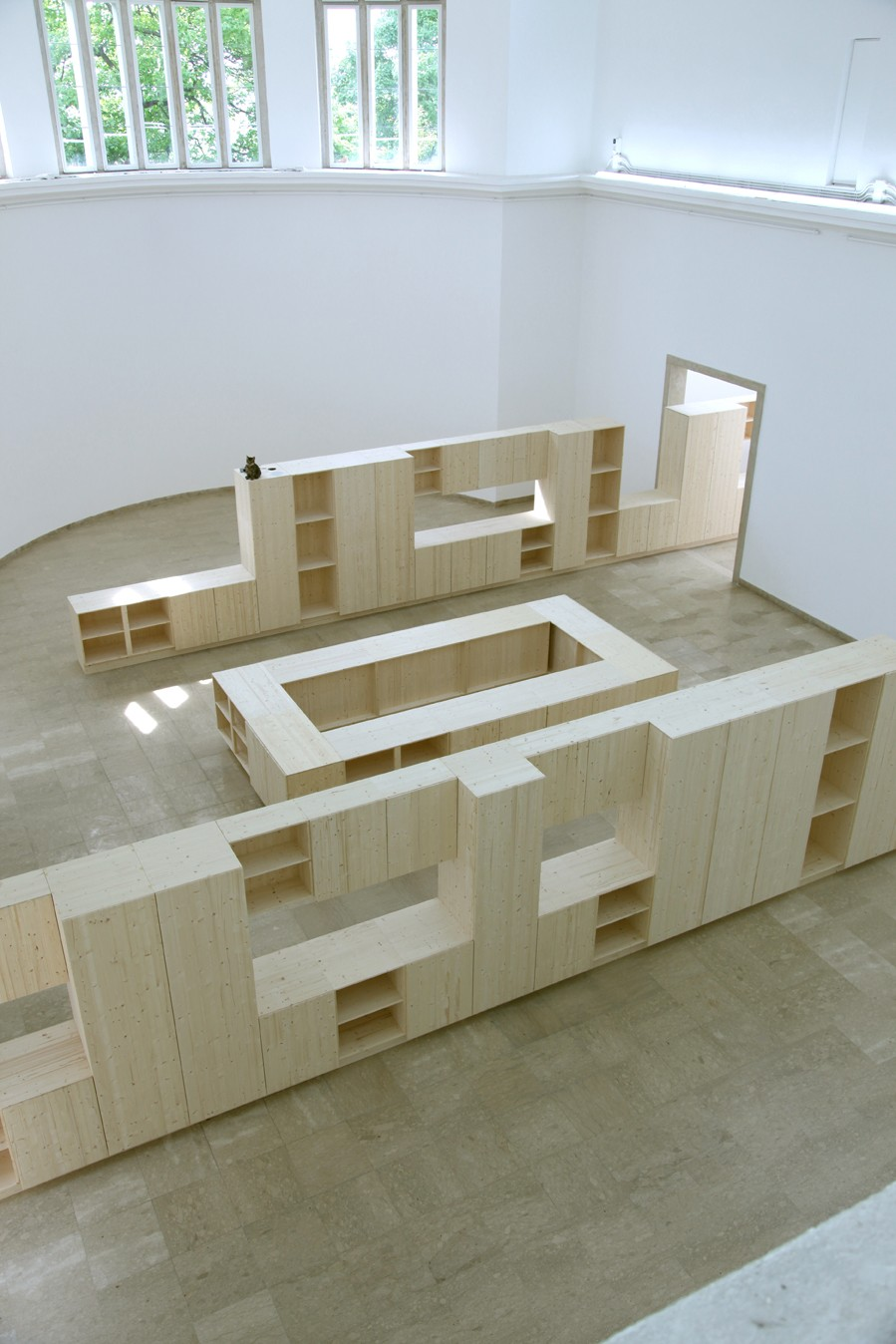
Installation in the German Pavilion, 2009

In 2008, Gillick was short-listed for the Vincent Award of the Stedelijk Museum Amsterdam. In 2009, Gillick represented Germany in the Giardini Pavilions of the Venice Biennale.

On 1 October 2010, in an open letter to the British Government's culture secretary Jeremy Hunt – co-signed by a further 27 previous Turner Prize nominees, and 19 winners—Gillick opposed any future cuts in public funding for the arts. In the letter the co-signatories described the arts in Britain as a "remarkable and fertile landscape of culture and creativity."

In October 2010, Gillick contributed a recipe for a vodka and lime juice-based cocktail as his participation in the Ryan Gander art project "Ryan's Bar". The beverage titled "Maybe it would be better if we worked in groups of two and a half," was sold for £50 per serving.

In 2010, he composed a score of "zingy electronica" for the artists' film Beijing, made by his ex-wife, Sarah Morris.

In 2019, Gillick and New Order released a new live album, "Σ(No,12k,Lg,17Mif)". The album was recorded live at the 2017 Manchester International Festival. It features new renditions of New Order classics, as well as rarities that the band had not performed in years.

== Artistic practice ==
Gillick's artistic output is characterized by diversity. As Caoimhin Mac Giolla Leith of University College Dublin has said,

"Gillick's practice to date has encompassed a wide range of media and activities (including sculpture, writing, architectural and graphic design, film, and music) as well as various critical and curatorial projects, his work as a whole is also marked by a fondness for diversions and distractions, tangents and evasions."

The focus of Gillick' practice is evaluations of the aesthetics of social systems with a focus on modes of production rather than consumption. He is interested in forms of social organization. Through his own writings and the use of specific materials in his artworks, Gillick examines how the built world carries traces of social, political and economic systems. As art critic Ina Blom has said,

"Artists such as Liam Gillick ... no longer address abstraction as the principle for the creation of distinct minimalist objects, but rather try to create through design spaces for open social interaction [artworks] whose actual use is to be constantly redefined within the situation of the exhibition – without necessarily producing relational-aesthetic models of community."

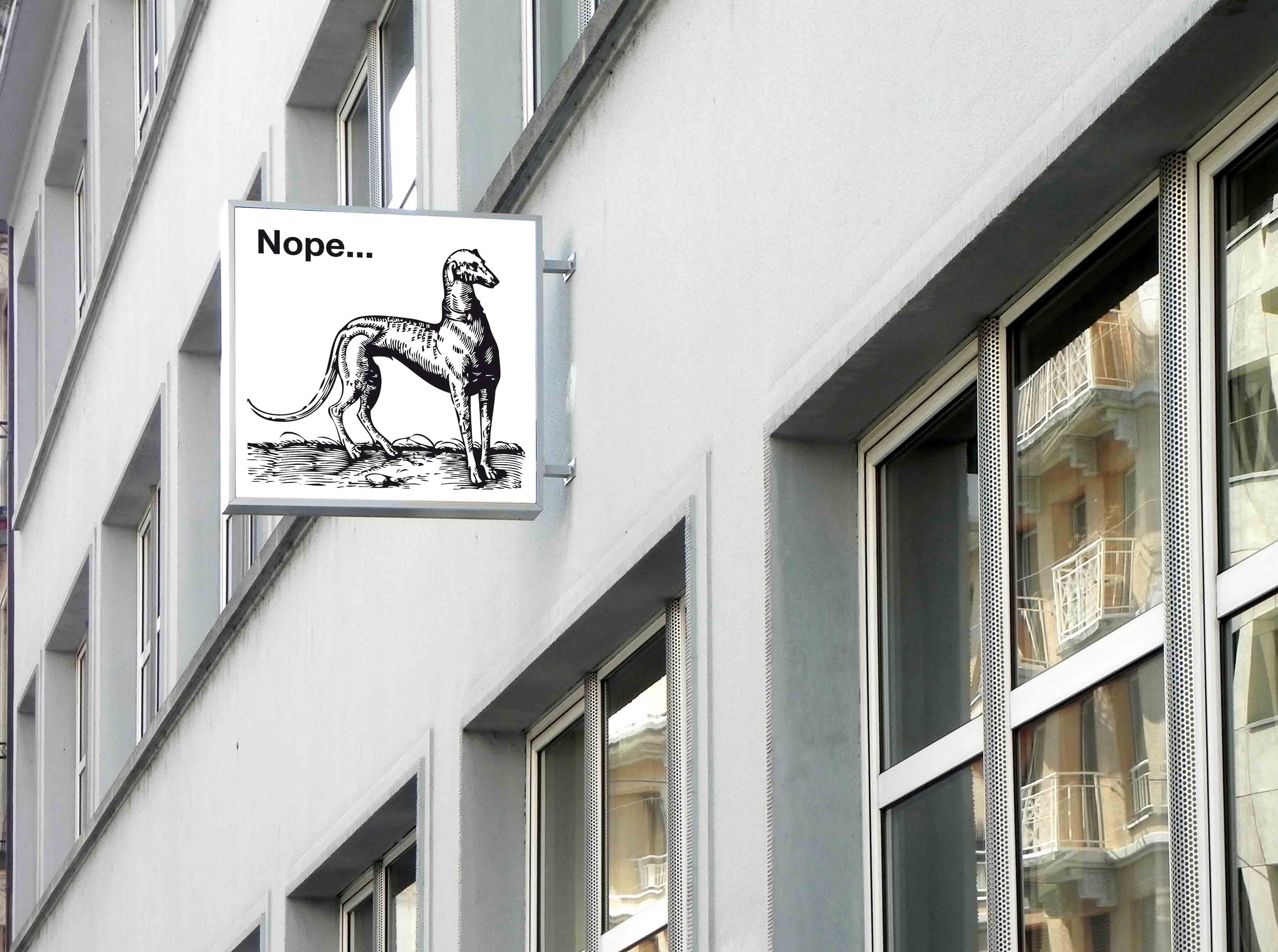
Liam Gillick, Nope, 2013, 2m2 art space, Geneva

Central to Gillick's practice are the publications that function in parallel to his artworks. An anthology of these "Allbooks" was published by Book Works, in 2009.

=== Documents Series with Henry Bond ===
Between 1990 and 1994, Gillick collaborated with artist Henry Bond on their Documents Series, a group of 83 fine art works which appropriated the modus operandi of a news gathering team, in order to produce relational art. In order to make the work, the duo posed as a news reporting team—i.e., a photographer and a journalist—often attending events scheduled in the Press Association's Gazette – a list of potentially newsworthy events in London. Bond worked as if a typical photojournalist, joining the other press photographers present; whilst Gillick operated as the journalist, first collecting the ubiquitous press kit before preparing his audio recording device.

The series was first shown commercially in 1991, at Karsten Schubert Limited and then, in 1992, at Maureen Paley's Interim Art —two of the galleries that were pioneers in the development of the YBA art movement. The series was subsequently exhibited at Tate Modern in the show Century City held in 2001, and at the Hayward Gallery in the exhibition How to Improve the World, in 2006.

=== Artist books ===
- Liam Gillick: Half a Complex, Hatje Cantz Verlag, New York, DAP, 2019
- Campaign, Museu Serralves, Porto, 2016
- Industry and Intelligence: Contemporary Art Since 1820, Columbia University Press, 2016
- Simon Critchley illus. Liam Gillick, Memory Theatre, London, Fitzcarraldo Editions, 2014
- Liam Gillick and Lawrence Weiner, A Syntax of Dependency, Milan, Mousse, 2011
- Pourquoi Travailler?, Three Star Books, 2010
- One long walk… Two short piers…, Kunst-und Ausstellungshalle der Bundesrepublik Deutschland, Bonn, Germany/Snoeck Verlag, Koln, 2010
- All Books: Liam Gillick, Book Works, London, 2009
- Liam Gillick 2009: Deutscher Pavilion La Biennale Di Venezia, Sternberg Press, 2009
- Meaning Liam Gillick, MIT Press, 2009
- Again the metaphor problem: Baldessari, Gillick, Ruf, Wiener, Zurich, Springer. Airs de Paris, Paris, Centre Pompidou, 2007
- Liam Gillick and Lawrence Weiner: Between Artists, New York, A.R.T. Press, 2006
- Liam Gillick: Literally No Place, Book Works, London, 2002
- Liam Gillick: The Wood Way, Whitechapel Gallery, London, 2002
- Liam Gillick, Okagon/Lukas & Sternberg, 2000
- Liam Gillick: Five or Six, Sternberg Press, 2000
- Liam Gillick, Erasmus is Late, Book Works, London, 1995

=== Exhibitions ===
Major solo exhibitions include Liam Gillick: Annlee You Proposes at Tate Modern, London, 2001–2002; The Wood Way at Whitechapel Gallery in London 2002; Projects 79: Liam Gillick, Literally at the Museum of Modern Art, New York, 2003; A short text on the possibility of creating an economy of equivalence at Palais de Tokyo, Paris, 2005; and the retrospective project Liam Gillick: Three perspectives and a short scenario 2008–2010, which toured the Kunsthalle Zürich, the Witte de With in Rotterdam, Kunstverein München, and the Museum of Contemporary Art, Chicago. The U.S. presentation of the exhibition was the most comprehensive of Gillick's work in an American museum. Accompanying his solo exhibition at the MCA was the show The one hundred and sixty-third floor: Liam Gillick Curates the Collection, curated by Gillick from the MCA collection. In 2016, Gillick presented a solo exhibition, titled Campaign at Serralves Museum of Contemporary Art, Porto.

== Other activities ==
Gillick serves on the board of Artists Space. Alongside Ingrid Schaffner, Tirdad Zolghadr and others, Gillick is a member of the Graduate Committee of the Center for Curatorial Studies and Art in Contemporary Culture at Bard College, Annandale-on-Hudson, New York. He has been on the faculty of Columbia University School of the Arts in New York City since 1997. Since 2017, he has been a founding member of The American Friends of the ICA, a support group for the Institute of Contemporary Arts (ICA).

In 2018, Gillick was a member of the jury that selected Kapwani Kiwanga for the Frieze Artist Award.

== Art market ==
Gillick is represented in the UK by Maureen Paley, in the US by Casey Kaplan, and in Ireland by Kerlin Gallery.

== Personal life ==
Gillick is cousin to British artists James and Theodore Gillick. He was married to artist Sarah Morris in 1998 at a ceremony in Miami. They divorced in 2012. In July 2024, Gillick married independent curator Piper Marshall in a ceremony on the North Fork of Long Island. Other relatives include sculptor Ernest Gillick, medallionist Mary Gillick, and anti-abortion activist Victoria Gillick.

== Literature ==
- Liam Gillick, Proxemics: Selected writing 1988-2006 (JRP Ringier, 2007).
- Lilian Haberer, Liam Gillick: Factories in the Snow (JRP-Ringier, 2007).
- Monika Szewczyk (ed.) Meaning Liam Gillick (MIT Press, 2009).
