= Traffic (art exhibition) =

Coordinates: 44.8481°N 0.5718°W

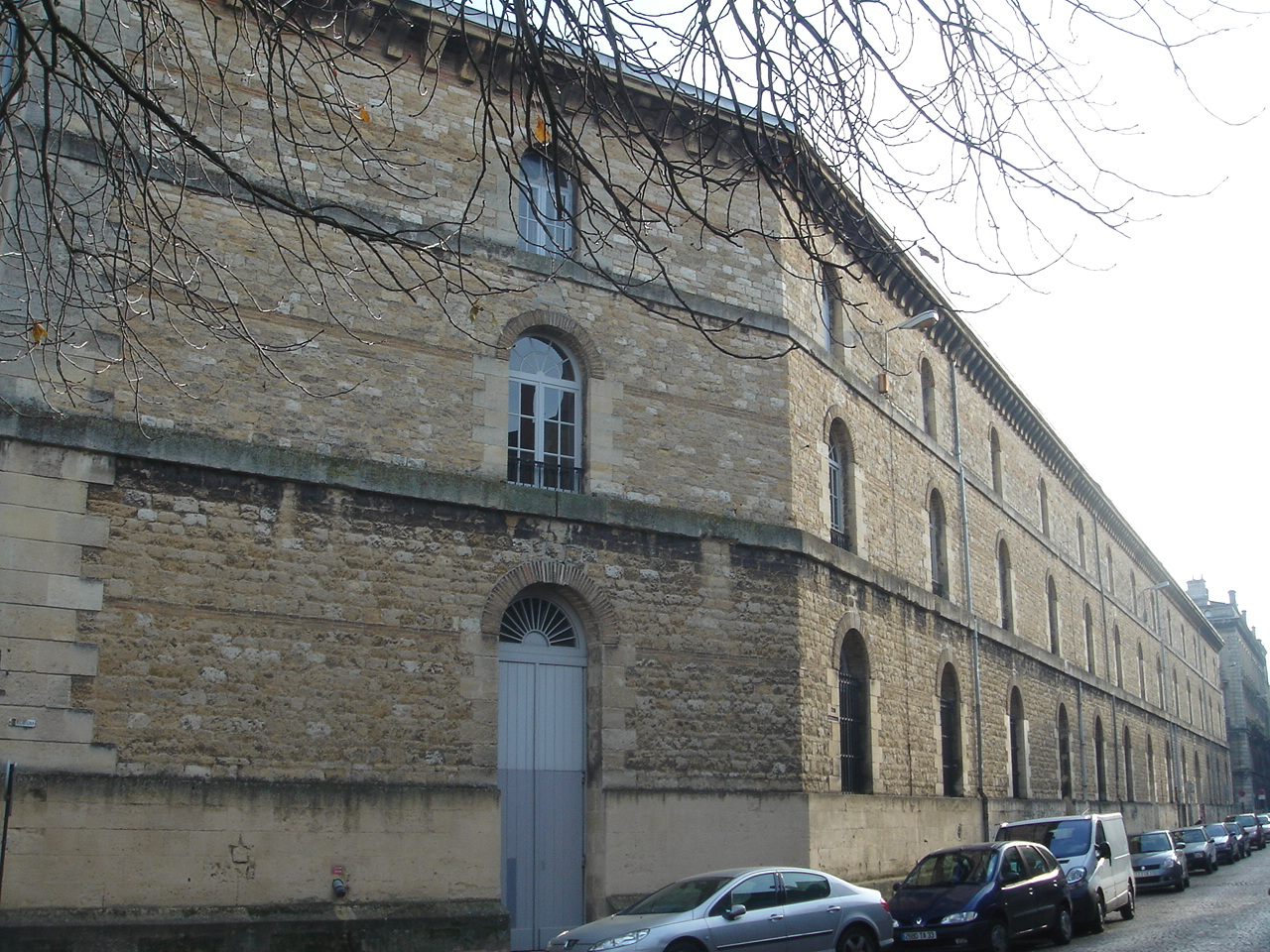
CAPC musée d'art contemporain de Bordeaux, in France, where the Traffic exhibition was on display in 1996

Traffic is the title of a group exhibition of contemporary art that took place at CAPC musée d'art contemporain de Bordeaux, France, through February and March, 1996.

== Theme ==
The exhibition was curated by Nicolas Bourriaud in order to showcase the tendency that he identified as Relational Aesthetics or Relational Art.

== Critical reaction ==
Writing in Zing art magazine, Emily Tsingou said, "For a brief moment, and on a theoretical level, the show attempted an interesting claim. The idea, though, of interactivity is not a very lucid one, especially if one considers that it could be stretched to such extent as to encompass any art work and the presence of a viewer (even in its traditional sense, art functions on that quality) ... overall the show bore the characteristics of a traffic jam: at a standstill and agitated."

Writing in Frieze art magazine, Carl Freedman said, "Traffic and Bourriaud’s concept of ‘relationality’ were just too unspecific to be capable of defining a new art, especially when so many of the works did little to support the exhibition’s premise. This was an ambitiously funded exhibition which was only able to provide the viewer with a largely familiar array of objects and images. With the primary beneficiaries of ‘Traffic’ tending to be the participating artists and their associates, Bourriaud may need to look at what actually constitutes the socio-political determinants of his ‘interhuman space’.

== Artists exhibited ==
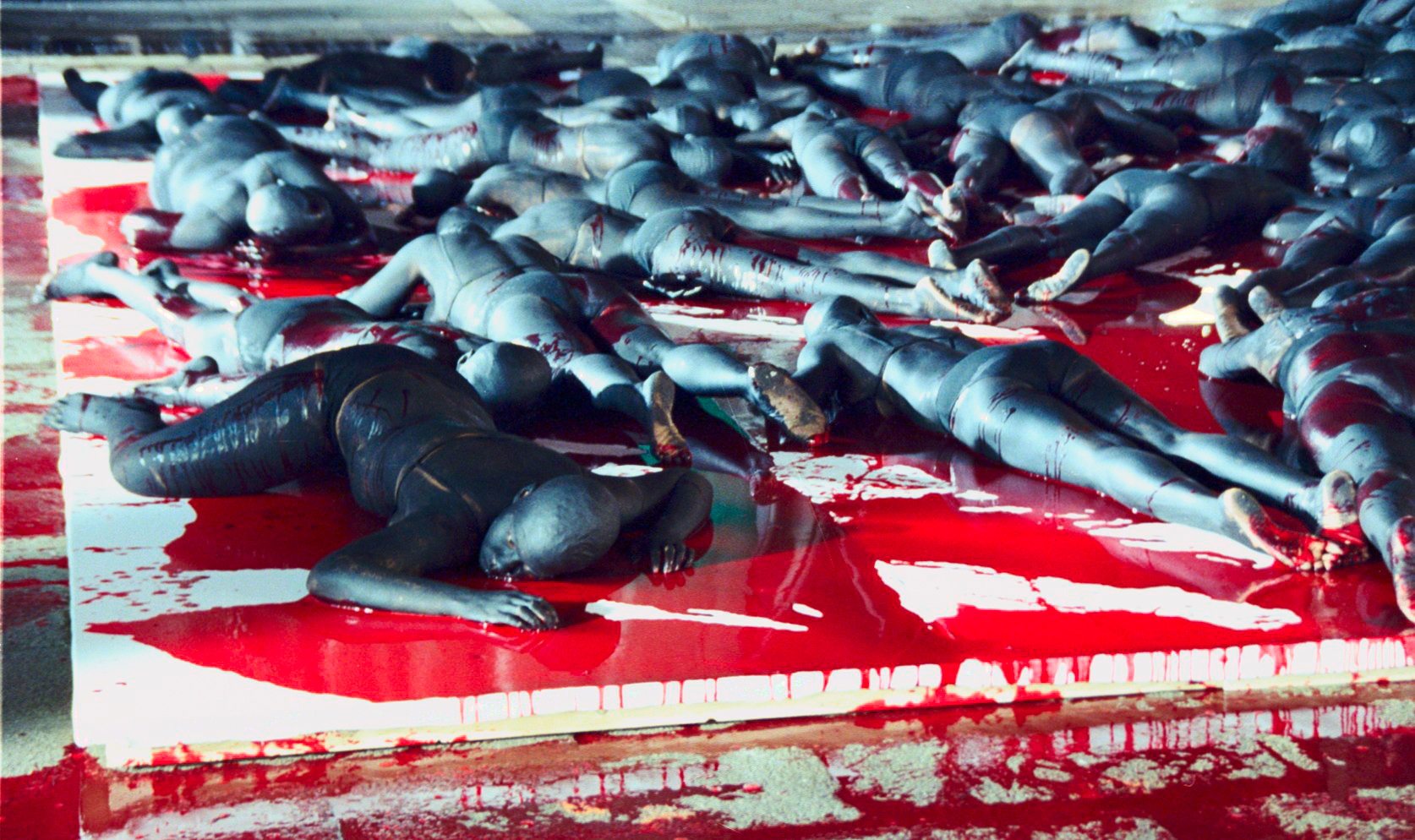
VB61, Still Death! Darfur Still Deaf? a 2007 artwork by Vanessa Beecroft who was included in the exhibition

- Vanessa Beecroft
- Henry Bond
- Jes Brinch and Henrik Plenge Jakobsen
- Angela Bulloch
- Maurizio Cattelan
- Andrea Clavadetscher and Eric Schumacher
- Honoré d'O
- Liam Gillick
- Dominique Gonzalez-Foerster
- Douglas Gordon
- Jens Haaning
- Lothar Hempel
- Christine Hill
- Noritoshi Hirakawa
- Carsten Höller
- Pierre Huyghe
- Peter Land
- Miltos Manetas
- Gabriel Orozco
- Jorge Pardo
- Philippe Parreno
- Jason Rhoades
- Christopher Sperandio and Simon Grennan
- Rirkrit Tiravanija
- Xavier Veilhan
- Gillian Wearing
- Kenji Yanobe
