= Miltos Manetas =

Greek artist (born 1964)

Miltos Manetas (Greek: Μίλτος Μανέτας; born October 6, 1964) is a Greek painter and multimedia artist. He currently lives and works in Bogotá.

Manetas has created internet art as well as paintings of cables, computers, video games and Internet websites since the late 1990s, notably since his participation in the 1995 Traffic (art exhibition) curated by Nicolas Bourriaud, which is often related to the beginning of the Relational art movement. Together with Mai Ueda, Manetas co-founded "Neen", an art movement which aimed to conflate the new technology of the time with art and poetry. Neen was launched at Gagosian Gallery, New York City, in 2000.

Manetas presented the Whitneybiennial.com, an online exhibition that challenged the 2002 Whitney Biennial show. His work has been collected by Charles Saatchi.

== Career ==
Born in Athens, Greece, to a prominent family from Arcadia, Miltos Manetas from the atelier of Vrasidas Vlachopoulos in Athens, moved to Milan at the age of 20, where he attended the Brera Academy. In 1995 he was included in Traffic, the survey exhibition curated by Nicolas Bourriaud that helped to launch the Relational Aesthetics art movement.

Manetas was categorized as one of artists of that movement in the catalogue of the Traffic show, and later, in Bourriaud's book Relational Aesthetics. But at this time, Manetas decided to change his approach to art, abandoning performance, objects and site specific installations, and he began making paintings about computer technology, exploring the possibilities of creating art by using video games and the Internet.

In 1996, Manetas moved to New York City and began working on a series of video game-related artworks, using Lara Croft and Mario as "ready-made" characters. In SuperMario Sleeping, a video from 1998, Mario sleeps under a tree, while in Flames, a 1997 video, Lara Croft is constantly getting hurt. Both works were exhibited at the Institute of Contemporary Arts, in the exhibition entitled Made in Italy. It was at that occasion that The Guardian published an article on Manetas calling him the El Greco of the geeks.

In subsequent years, Manetas displayed exhibitions throughout the world. Another important show was Elysian Fields at Centre Georges Pompidou in Paris, curated by the Purple Institute.

Manetas then commissioned a California branding agency to come up with a new term that would bring a radical change to his work. In spring of 2000, Manetas presented the new name, Neen, to an exhibition-performance held at the Gagosian Gallery in New York City.

Following this presentation, Manetas moved to Los Angeles, where he started his ElectronicOrphanage enterprise. He hired young people with experience in contemporary art and/or design, asking them to abandon what they were doing to test ideas for the Internet. In 2002, Manetas presented the Whitneybiennial.com, an online exhibition which challenged the 2002 Whitney Biennial show.

In 2007, London's Hayward Gallery commissioned Manetas to do a special project around the idea of Existential Computing, a new term he was using for his practice. During this show, Manetas met Malcolm McLaren and they participated together in a show that artist Stefan Bruggemann curated at the I-20 gallery in New York City in September 2007. Manetas' work for this exhibition was a piece commissioned previously by Newcastle's Baltic Centre for Contemporary Art and the British magazine Dazed & Confused for the Dazed & Confused versus Andy Warhol exhibition. It consisted solely of a URL written on the wall: http://www.ThankYouAndyWarhol.com.

In 2009, Manetas together with curator Jan Aman, created the first ever "Internet Pavilion" for the Venice Biennale. As a part of this work, they invited ThePirateBay and the Piratbyrån activists to participate and make their first "Embassy of Piracy."

== Bibliography ==
- 100 Years after Les Demoiselles d'Avignon, Essays by Miltos Manetas (London 2006, soft cover, 97 pages published by ElectronicOrphanage press)
- NEEN (by Miltos Manetas et al.; Italy, Charta, 2006, ISBN 88-8158-601-0)
