= Documents Series =

An example of the Documents Series by Henry Bond and Liam Gillick. Title: 11 February 1992, Trafalgar Square, London, England. Evacuation and closure of Whitehall and surrounding area due to discovery of a suspect device.

Documents Series is the overall title of a series of eighty-three fine artworks made collaboratively by Henry Bond and Liam Gillick between 1990 and 1995. It has been suggested that the intention behind the work was to "examine the procedures behind news-gathering."

== Praxis ==
In order to make the work the duo posed as a news reporting team—i.e., a photographer and a journalist—often attending events scheduled in the Press Association's Gazette—a list of potentially newsworthy events in London. Bond worked as if a typical photojournalist, joining the other press photographers present; whilst Gillick operated as the journalist, first collecting the ubiquitous press kit before preparing his audio recording device.

== Format ==
Each work in the group takes the form of a framed photographic print and a corresponding text panel which includes the time, date, and location of the event, together with a brief description and, in some instances, an extract of the audio recording made at each event by Gillick.

== Critical reception ==
The series was first shown commercially in 1991, at Karsten Schubert Limited and then, in 1992, at Maureen Paley's Interim Art —two of the galleries that were pioneering the development of the YBA art movement. Writing in 2001, whilst a curator at Tate, Emma Dexter stated, "Henry Bond and Liam Gillick posed as journalists at press and media events, creating as a result a series of photo/text works that are a neat elision of two distinct realms of information gathering and sorting: that of conceptual art and that of the news and publicity industry, Documents exposes the codes and rituals involved in news management, but it has also become, with time, an accidental history of our age." Examples of the series are held in the Arts Council Collection and have been exhibited at Tate Modern, London (Century City, 2001) and Hayward Gallery, London (How to Improve the World, 2006). The complete series were showcased at the Walker Art Center (Brilliant! New Art from London) in 1995.
