= Relational art =

Mode or tendency in fine art

Relational art or relational aesthetics is a mode or tendency in fine art practice that emerged under various names in the 1990s. In 1998 French art critic Nicolas Bourriaud defined esthétique relationnelle (relational aesthetics) as "a set of artistic practices which take as their theoretical and practical point of departure the whole of human relations and their social context, rather than an independent and private space." The artist can be more accurately viewed as the "catalyst" in relational art, rather than an author at the center. While helpfully moving aesthetics beyond the sole concerns of the individual into a larger social sphere, relational art as Bourriaud defines it stays within the human realm, reflecting a humanist value system rooted in modernism. This sets relational art and aesthetics in contrast to its immediate predecessor, Brooklyn Immersionism, a posthumanist art movement which began in the late 1980s and involved dozens of creative groups in a sustained and transformative relationship with a living urban ecosystem. Both systems aesthetics shared some of the features of social practice art and all three had roots in the process art of the 1970s and "web of life" philosophies of Native Americans.

== Etymology ==
One of the first attempts to analyze and categorize art from the 1990s, the term relational art was developed by Nicolas Bourriaud in 1998 in his book Esthétique relationnelle (Relational Aesthetics). The term was first used in 1996, in the catalogue for the exhibition Traffic curated by Bourriaud at CAPC musée d'art contemporain de Bordeaux. Traffic included the artists that Bourriaud would continue to refer to throughout the 1990s, such as Henry Bond, Vanessa Beecroft, Maurizio Cattelan, Dominique Gonzalez-Foerster, Liam Gillick, Christine Hill, Carsten Höller, Pierre Huyghe, Miltos Manetas, Jorge Pardo, Philippe Parreno, Gabriel Orozco, Jason Rhoades, Douglas Gordon and Rirkrit Tiravanija. The exhibition took its title and inspiration from Jacques Tati's film Trafic (1971), in which Tati's protagonist is a Parisian automobile designer preparing a new model for an international auto show. In a dénouement that became a fundamental relational aesthetics strategy, particularly for Tiravanija, Tati's entire film is about the designer's journey to the auto show at which he arrives just in time for the show to close.

=== Relational aesthetics ===
Bourriaud wishes to approach art in a way that ceases "to take shelter behind Sixties art history", and instead seeks to offer different criteria by which to analyse the often opaque and open-ended works of art of the 1990s. To achieve this, Bourriaud imports the language of the 1990s internet boom, using terminology such as user-friendliness, interactivity and DIY (do-it-yourself). In his 2002 book Postproduction: Culture as Screenplay: How Art Reprograms the World, Bourriaud describes "relational aesthetics" as works that take as their point of departure the changing mental space opened by the internet. The interactive, communal expression afforded by the emergence of the World Wide Web can be seen in many ways to echo older, indigenous notions of webs and environmental engagement. Relational art, Social Practices, Process Art and Immersionism are all indebted to Native American insights into the larger web of nature, as Chief Seattle (Si'ahl) makes clear from a speech in 1854:

"All things are connected like the blood that unites us all. Humanity did not weave the web of life, we are merely a strand in it. Whatever we do to the web, we do to ourselves."

=== Relational art ===
Bourriaud explores the notion of relational aesthetics through examples of what he calls relational art. According to Bourriaud, relational art encompasses "a set of artistic practices which take as their theoretical and practical point of departure the whole of human relations and their social context, rather than an independent and private space." The artwork creates a social environment in which people come together to participate in a shared activity. Bourriaud claims "the role of artworks is no longer to form imaginary and utopian realities, but to actually be ways of living and models of action within the existing real, whatever scale chosen by the artist."

Robert Stam, the head of new media and film studies at New York University, coined a term for the shared activity group: witnessing publics. Witnessing publics are "that loose collection of individuals, constituted by and through the media, acting as observers of injustices that might otherwise go unreported or unanswered." The meaning of relational art is created when arts perception is altered while leaving the original artifact intact.

In relational art, the audience is envisaged as a community. Rather than the artwork being an encounter between a viewer and an object, relational art produces encounters between people. Through these encounters, meaning is elaborated collectively, rather than in the space of individual consumption.

== Critical reception ==
Writer and director Ben Lewis has suggested that relational art is a new "ism", analogous to art movements of earlier periods such as impressionism, expressionism and cubism. As a systems aesthetic emerging at the turn of the 21st century, it parallels Brooklyn Immersionism which began a few years earlier and has been described by the arts historian, Cisco Bradley in 2023 as "the next stage of evolution of the New York art scene." In that immersion and relationships are deeply related processes, an eco-social zeitgeist in the arts can be said to have emerged out of both movements.

In "Antagonism and Relational Aesthetics", published in 2004 in October, Claire Bishop describes the aesthetic of Palais de Tokyo as a "laboratory", the "curatorial modus operandi" of art produced in the 1990s. Bishop writes, "An effect of this insistent promotion of these ideas as artists-as-designer, function over contemplation, and open-endedness over aesthetic resolution is often ultimately to enhance the status of the curator, who gains credit for stage-managing the overall laboratory experience. As Hal Foster warned in the mid-1990s, 'the institution may overshadow the work that it otherwise highlights: it becomes the spectacle, it collects the cultural capital, and the director-curator becomes the star.'" Bishop identifies Bourriaud's book as an important first step in identifying tendencies in the art of the 1990s but also writes in the same essay that such work “seems to derive from a creative misreading of poststructuralist theory: rather than the interpretations of a work of art being open to continual reassessment, the work of art itself is argued to be in perpetual flux.” Bishop also asks, "if relational art produces human relations, then the next logical question to ask is what types of relations are being produced, for whom, and why?" She continues that "the relations set up by relational aesthetics are not intrinsically democratic, as Bourriaud suggests, since they rest too comfortably within an ideal of subjectivity as whole and of community as immanent togetherness."

In "Traffic Control", published one year later in Artforum, artist and critic Joe Scanlan goes one step further in ascribing to relational aesthetics a palpable peer pressure. Scanlan writes, "Firsthand experience has convinced me that relational aesthetics has more to do with peer pressure than collective action or egalitarianism, which would suggest that one of the best ways to control human behavior is to practice relational aesthetics."

== Exhibitions ==
In 2002, Bourriaud curated an exhibition at the San Francisco Art Institute, Touch: Relational Art from the 1990s to Now, "an exploration of the interactive works of a new generation of artists." Exhibited artists included Angela Bulloch, Liam Gillick, Felix Gonzalez-Torres, Jens Haaning, Philippe Parreno, Gillian Wearing and Andrea Zittel. Critic Chris Cobb suggests that Bourriaud's "snapshot" of 1990s art is a confirmation of the term (and idea) of relational art, while illustrating "different forms of social interaction as art that deal fundamentally with issues regarding public and private space."

In 2008, Guggenheim Museum curator Nancy Spector organized an exhibition with most of the artists associated with Relational Aesthetics, but the term itself was shelved in favor of calling the show Theanyspacewhatever. The exhibition included stalwarts Bulloch, Gillick, Gonzalez-Foerster, Höller, Huyghe, and Tiravanija, along with loosely affiliated artists Maurizio Cattelan, Douglas Gordon, Jorge Pardo, and Andrea Zittel.

The LUMA Foundation has presented many artists associated with Relational Aesthetics.
