= Schoorel =

Schoorel is a surname. Notable people with the surname include:

- Maaike Schoorel (born 1973), artist
- Thomas Schoorel (born 1989), Dutch tennis player
