= Nicolas Bourriaud =

French curator and art critic (born 1965)

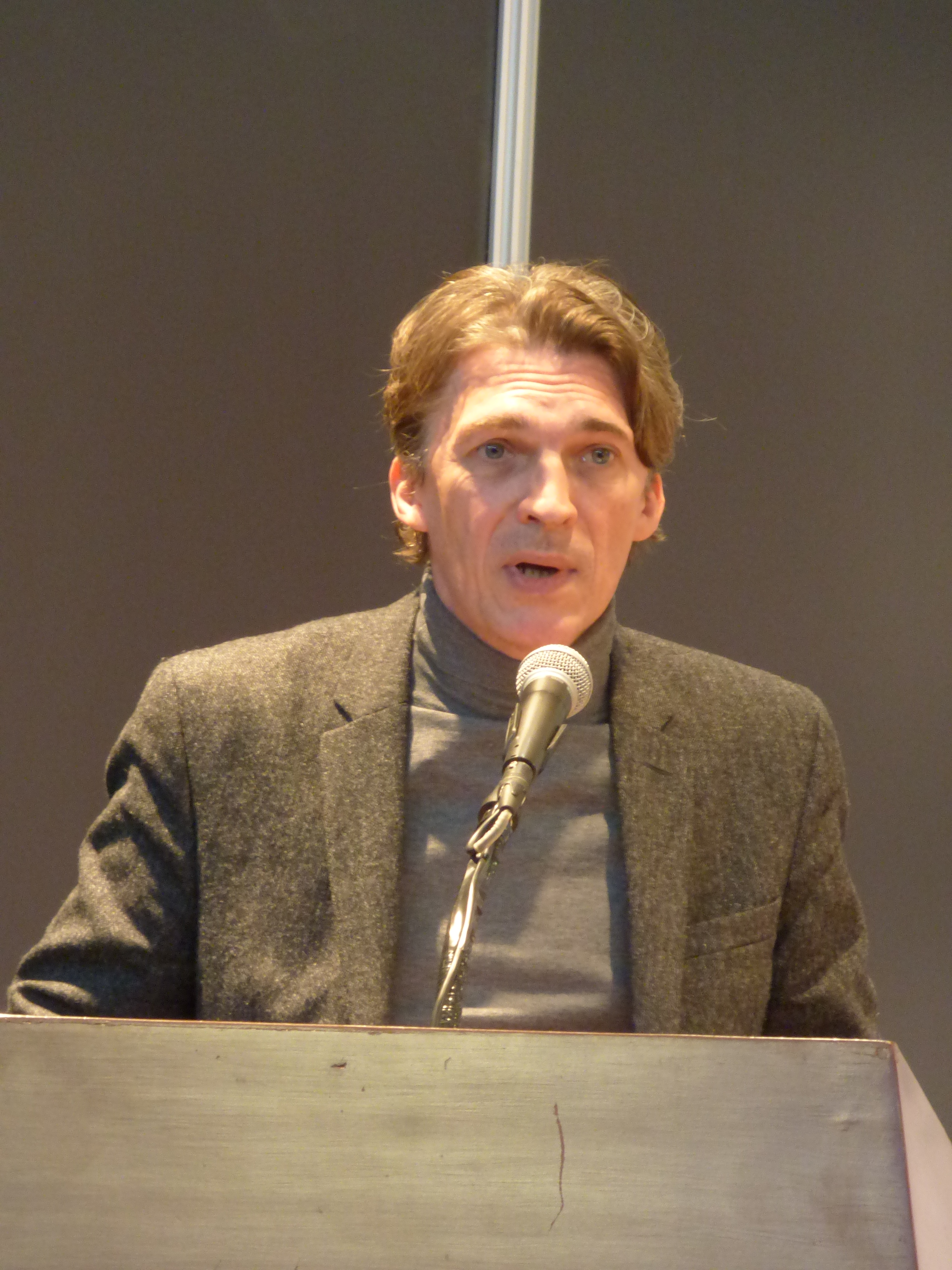
Bourriaud in 2016

Nicolas Bourriaud (born 1965) is a French curator and art critic. Bourriaud began his career as an art critic and moved into curating in 1990. Bourriaud is best known for his desire to observe and nominate "tendencies" in visual art including Relational art, Altermodern and others. From 1999 to 2006, he served as co-founder and co-director of the Palais de Tokyo in Paris alongside Jerome Sans. He has worked as an artistic director, curator, and art critic, developing contemporary art projects in France and internationally, both independently and in collaboration with others.

== Career ==
Bourriaud was the Paris correspondent for Flash Art (1987–1995) and the founder and director of the contemporary art magazine Documents sur l'art (1992–2000). He was also one of the 13 co-curators of the "Aperto" section of the 1993 Venice Biennale.

With Jérôme Sans, Bourriaud cofounded the Palais de Tokyo in Paris, where he served as codirector from 1999 to 2006. During his time at Palais de Tokyo, he also served on the team behind the first and second editions of the Moscow Biennial, in 2005 and 2007, respectively.

Bourriaud was the Gulbenkian curator of contemporary art from 2007 to 2010 at Tate Britain in London. In 2009 he curated the fourth Tate Triennial, titled Altermodern.

=== École Nationale Supérieure des Beaux-Arts, 2007–2010 ===
Bourriaud was the Director of the École Nationale Supérieure des Beaux-Arts, an art school in Paris, France, from 2011 to 2015. During his time in office, he organized the 2011 edition of the Athens Biennale, the 2014 edition of the Taipei Biennial, and the 2015 edition of the Kaunas Biennial. In 2014, he was part of the selection committee that chose Giuseppe Penone, Nedko Solakov and Liam Gillick as the winners of the European Central Bank's international competition for site-specific artworks at its new premises. By 2015, he was dismissed from his post by the city, for "reasons related to a change of direction," according to a Facebook status posted by Bourriaud at the time.)

=== MO.CO., 2015–2021 ===
In 2015, Bourriaud was appointed director of the La Panacée art centre (a.k.a. MO.CO.PANACÉE) and the director of the Contemporary Art Center of Montpellier, France (aka MO.CO.); In 2018, he joined a group of arts professionals — among them the artists Christian Boltanski and Jean-Luc Moulène – in signing an open letter published by the newspaper Libération, calling on the city of Paris to abandon the installation of Bouquet of Tulips by Jeff Koons. By 2021, he was ousted as director of MO.CO. after months of growing political tensions between Bourriaud and the city's mayor, Michaël Delafosse.

== Writing ==
Bourriaud is best known among English speakers for his publications Relational Aesthetics (1998/English version 2002), Postproduction (2001), and The Exform (2015/ English version 2016). Relational Aesthetics in particular has come to be seen as a defining text for a wide variety of art produced by a generation who came to prominence in Europe in the early 1990s. Bourriaud coined the term in 1995, in a text for the catalogue of the exhibition Traffic that was shown at the CAPC contemporary art museum in Bordeaux.

In Postproduction (2001), Bourriaud relates deejaying to contemporary art. Radicant (2009) aims to define the emergence of the first global modernity, based on translation and nomadic forms, against the postmodern aesthetics based on identities. In The Exform (2016), Bourriaud examines the dynamics of ideology, specifically as it was developed in the work of Louis Althusser, to account for distinctions between the productive and unproductive, product and waste, and the included and excluded in their relation to society and art production.

== Books ==
- Formes de vie. L'art moderne et l'invention de soi. Paris: Editions Denoël, 1999. ISBN 2-207-25501-8
- Relational Aesthetics. Paris: Presses du réel, 2002. ISBN 2-84066-060-1
- Postproduction: Culture as Screenplay: How Art Reprograms the World. New York: Lukas & Sternberg, 2002. ISBN 0-9711193-0-9. Translated by Jeanine Herman.
- Touch: Relational Art from the 1990s to Now. San Francisco: San Francisco Art Institute, 2002.
- Playlist. Paris: Palais de Tokyo: Editions cercle d'art, 2004. ISBN 2-7022-0736-7
- The Radicant, Sternberg Press, 2009. ISBN 978-1-933128-42-9. Translated by James Gussen and Lili Porten.
- Radikant. Berlin: Merve, 2009. ISBN 978-3-88396-251-1
- Altermodern. Tate, 2009. ISBN 978-1-85437-817-0
- La Exforma. Buenos Aires: Adriana Hidalgo Editora, 2015. ISBN 9789873793165
- The Exform. Brooklyn, NY: Verso, 2016. ISBN 9781784783808

== Curated exhibitions ==
- Courts Métrages Immobiles, Venice Biennale, 1990
- Aperto '93, Venice Biennale, 1993
- Commerce, Espace St Nicolas, Paris, 1994
- Traffic, Capc Bordeaux, 1996
- Joint Ventures, Basilico Gallery, New York, 1996
- Le Capital, CRAC Sète, 1999
- Contacts, Kunsthalle Fri-Art, Fribourg, Switzerland, 2000
- Négociations, CRAC, Sète, 2000
- Touch, San Francisco Art Institute, 2002
- GNS (Global Navigation System), Palais de Tokyo, Paris, 2003
- Playlist, Palais de Tokyo, Paris, 2004
- Notre Histoire, Palais de Tokyo, Paris, 2006
- Moscow Biennale, 2005 and 2007 (with Backstein, Boubnova, Birnbaum, Obrist, Martinez)
- Estratos, Murcia, 2008.
- The Tate Triennial 2009: Altermodern, Tate Britain, London, 2009
- Athens Biennial 2011 : Monodrome.
- The Angel of history, Palais des Beaux-arts, Paris, 2013.
- Cookbook, Palais des Beaux-arts, Paris, 2013.
- Taipei Biennial 2014, The Great acceleration.
- Kaunas Biennial 2015, Threads : a fantasmagoria about distance.
- Istanbul Biennial 2019, The Seventh Continent.
