= Hopgood =

Hopgood is a surname. Notable people with the surname include:

- Alan Hopgood (born 1934), Australian actor and writer
- Don Hopgood (born 1938), Australian politician
- Carl Hopgood (born 1972), British sculptor
- Hoon-Yung Hopgood (born 1974), American politician
- Jeff Hopgood (1948–2006), Australian rules footballer
- Kev Hopgood (born 1961), English comic artist
- Paul Hopgood (born 1973), Australian rules footballer
- Stephen Hopgood (born 1965), British political scientist
