= Harry David Art Collection =

Private art collection

The Harry David Art Collection is a private collection of contemporary art, focusing on the art of Africa and its diaspora.

== The Collection ==
The Harry David Art Collection focuses on artists engaging with cultural, political and historical voices that reflect the continent of Africa, exploring themes including immigration and economics. The collection includes works by Beninese artist Meschac Gaba, Kenya-born artist Wangechi Mutu, South African/Malawian artist Billie Zangewa, the Nigerian Taiye Idahor, the African-Americans Hank Willis Thomas, Mickalene Thomas and Rashid Johnson, as well as the British artists Chris Ofili and Lynette Yiadom-Boakye.

Taking the form of both short and long-term loans the Harry David Art Collection is dedicated to making the collection openly accessible to a global audience through museums and public institutions.

== Exhibitions ==
The inaugural exhibition for The Harry David Collection, entitled ‘Ubuntu’, opened in September 2020, having been rescheduled due to coronavirus. The South African term ubuntu can be translated as “humanness” or “a sense of common humanity”. The exhibition includes 66 works by 34 artists from the Harry David Art Collection, presented in five rooms within the National Museum of Contemporary Art, Athens. The rooms were designed by RIBA award-winning Kallos Turin architects (London and San Francisco).

The works on display were chosen by five different artists and curators including: Rashid Johnson, a visual artist; Osei Bonsu, curator of international art at Tate Modern; Elvira Dyangani Ose, art writer and gallerist; Burkard Vannholt, collector; and Emily Tsingou, art advisor.

== Personal ==
Harry David spent his early years growing up in Nigeria, and is now based between Nicosia (Cyprus), Athens (Greece) and Lagos (Nigeria) with his wife Lana de Beer, who was born and raised in South Africa. De Beer and David are active patrons of Tate, through its African Acquisitions Committee.
