= Michaela Eichwald =

German painter based in Berlin

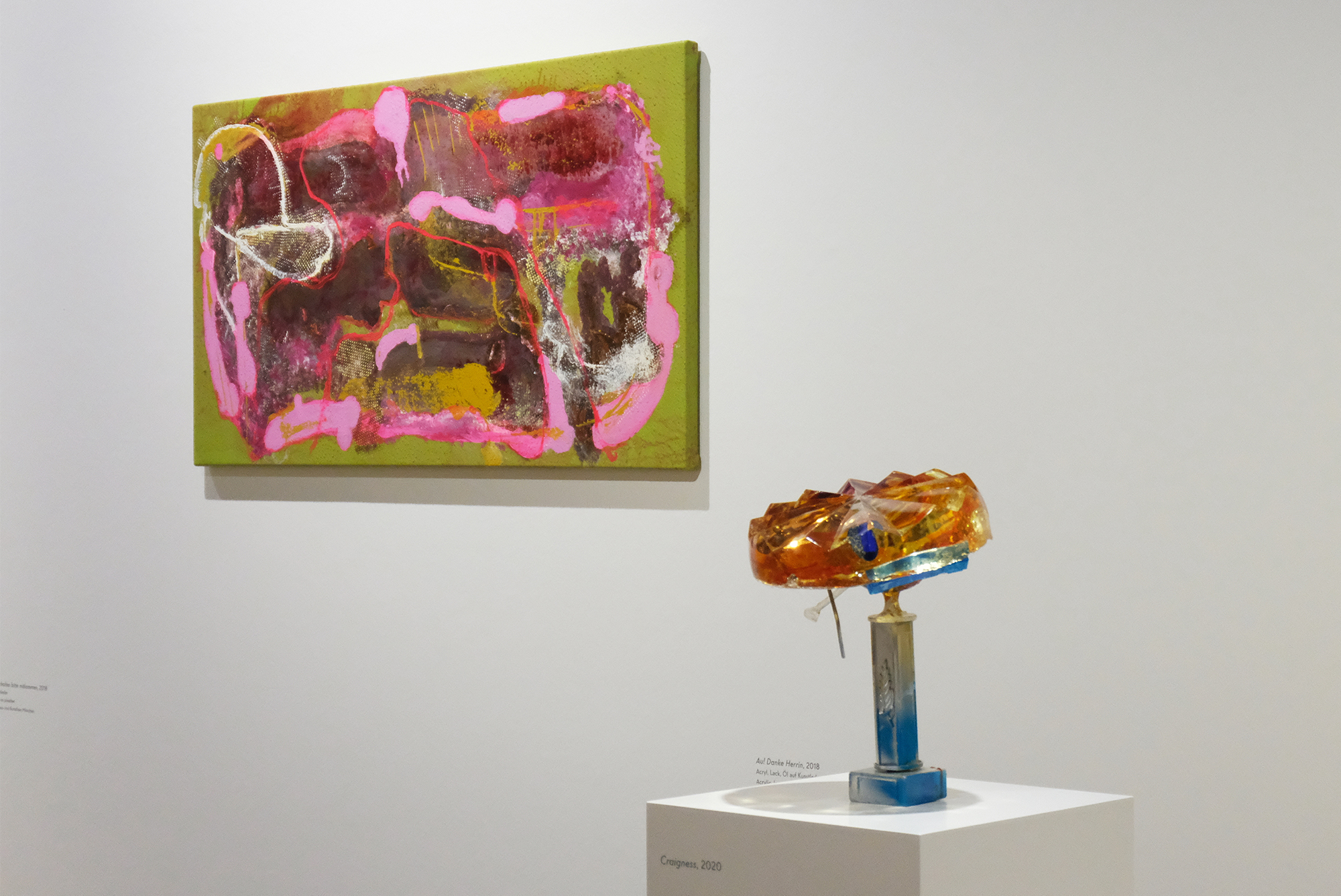
Painting and sculpture at an exhibition of the artist, Lenbachhaus, Munich (2021)

Michaela Eichwald (born 1967) is a German painter based in Berlin. Her work mostly consists of abstract paintings using mixed media (including acrylic and oil paints, spray paint, wax, lacquer, paper) on different surfaces (pleather, fabrics). Art critic Christopher Knight described her influences as, "Abstract Expressionism, Japanese Gutai and 1980s Neo-Expressionism, both German and American." Eichwald's paintings have been shown at the Museum of Modern Art, Museum Brandhorst, the Rennes Biennial, dépendance, Reena Spaulings Fine Art, Maureen Paley's gallery, and other art galleries. Since 2006, Eichwald has been running the blog uhutrust.com, where she shares photos and texts. Since the summer semester of 2021 she has held a professorship for abstract painting at the Academy of Fine Arts Vienna.
