= Jack Wendler =

American art gallery owner

Jack Wendler is a former art gallery owner who co-founded the fine arts journal Art Monthly in 1976. Between December 1971 and July 1974 the Jack Wendler Gallery held 26 exhibitions in five London locations—including a show by American artist Robert Barry. In 1991, together with artist Liam Gillick, he founded the limited editions and publishing company G-W Press ("Gillick-Wendler Press"). The company produced limited editions by artists including Jeremy Deller and Anya Gallaccio.
