= Kaye Donachie =

British painter

Kaye Donachie (born 1970 in Glasgow) is a contemporary British painter based in London. Her modest-sized, figurative paintings make use of figurative imagery relating to modernism, domesticity, longing, and utopian counter-cultural movements. Stacy Martin describes her most recent show as embodying a "fascination with heroines and literary inspiration [which] runs throughout all her projects along with her subtle nods to romanticism making for a collection that is more 'poetic than narrative' in effect."

Donachie shows at Peres Projects in Berlin and Maureen Paley in London. Her work has been reviewed in Frieze and Artforum.
