= 26 October 1993 =

1993 photograph

- Artist: Henry Bond; Sam Taylor-Wood
- Year: 1993
- Medium: Photograph
- Movement: Pastiche
- Dimensions: 23 in × 19 in (58 cm × 48 cm)
- Location: Tate Modern, London

26 October 1993 is an artwork created in 1993 as a collaboration between English artists Henry Bond and Sam Taylor-Wood, both of whom were involved in the Young British Artists scene of contemporary art. It is a pastiche or remaking of a well-known photographic portrait of John Lennon and Yoko Ono that was made by Annie Leibovitz a few hours before Lennon's murder.

== Production and critical reception ==
Annie Leibovitz's original 1980 photo.

Annie Leibovitz's photo on the cover of Rolling Stone

The photo "made a splash in the British art scene in 1993." The work was exhibited as part of the exhibition Brilliant! held at the Walker Art Center, Minneapolis, USA, in 1995.

In his 2001 book High Art Lite, art historian Julian Stallabrass states that the Bond/Taylor-Wood version offers a "reversal of gender roles" (however, the original also has Lennon and Ono in the same position). Stallabrass also states that:

"The work refers to naïve 1960s idealism, though not entirely mockingly, rather asking the viewer to contrast the situation in the 1990s with the 1960s ... for such artists, it is clear we are living in a time of the twilight of ideals."

Commenting on the photo-work in 2010, Taylor-Wood said:

The bizarre thing is that I'd completely forgotten about that piece until it was brought up in an interview ... I don't remember what drove us to make it. Must have been high concept in there somewhere, but God knows what it was. I guess there's a running interest in male vulnerability in my work, so maybe it's just that.

The authorship of this artwork has been contested with both artists, at different times, assuming control of the image and asserting origination/intellectual property; indeed, it has been suggested that the photographer that the pair hired to shoot the photograph also later claimed authorship of it.

The photograph is 23 in × 19 in (58 cm × 48 cm); on 23 October 2001, the photograph was offered at an art auction held by Christie's Auctioneers as "work number five from an edition of five" and sold for $15,059.
