= Maaike Schoorel =

Dutch visual artist

Maaike Schoorel (born 1973) is an artist based in London.

Schoorel was born in Santpoort, Netherlands. She makes paintings based on photographs, using traditional genres such as landscape, portrait and still-life. She favours pale colours and minimal detail.

Maaike Schoorel is represented in London by Maureen Paley.
