= Maureen Paley =

American art dealer (born 1953)

- Born: 1953 (age 72–73)
- Education: Sarah Lawrence College; Brown University; Royal College of Art

Maureen Paley (born 1953) is the American owner of a contemporary art gallery in Bethnal Green, London, where she lives. Initially named Interim Art, the gallery was renamed Maureen Paley in 2004 as a celebration of its 20th anniversary. The gallery is located at 60 Three Colts Lane.

Paley exhibited Young British Artists at an early stage. Artists represented include Turner Prize winners Lawrence Abu Hamdan, Gillian Wearing and Wolfgang Tillmans. One thing in common with many of the artists represented is their interest in addressing social issues.

== Early life and education ==
Cover of Summer 1973 edition of Sarah Lawrence Magazine with artwork by Paley

Maureen Paley was born in New York. She attended Sarah Lawrence College, and graduated from Brown University in 1975. She emigrated to England in 1977, attending the Royal College of Art from 1978 to 1980, where she gained an MA in photography.

== Career ==
=== 1980s ===
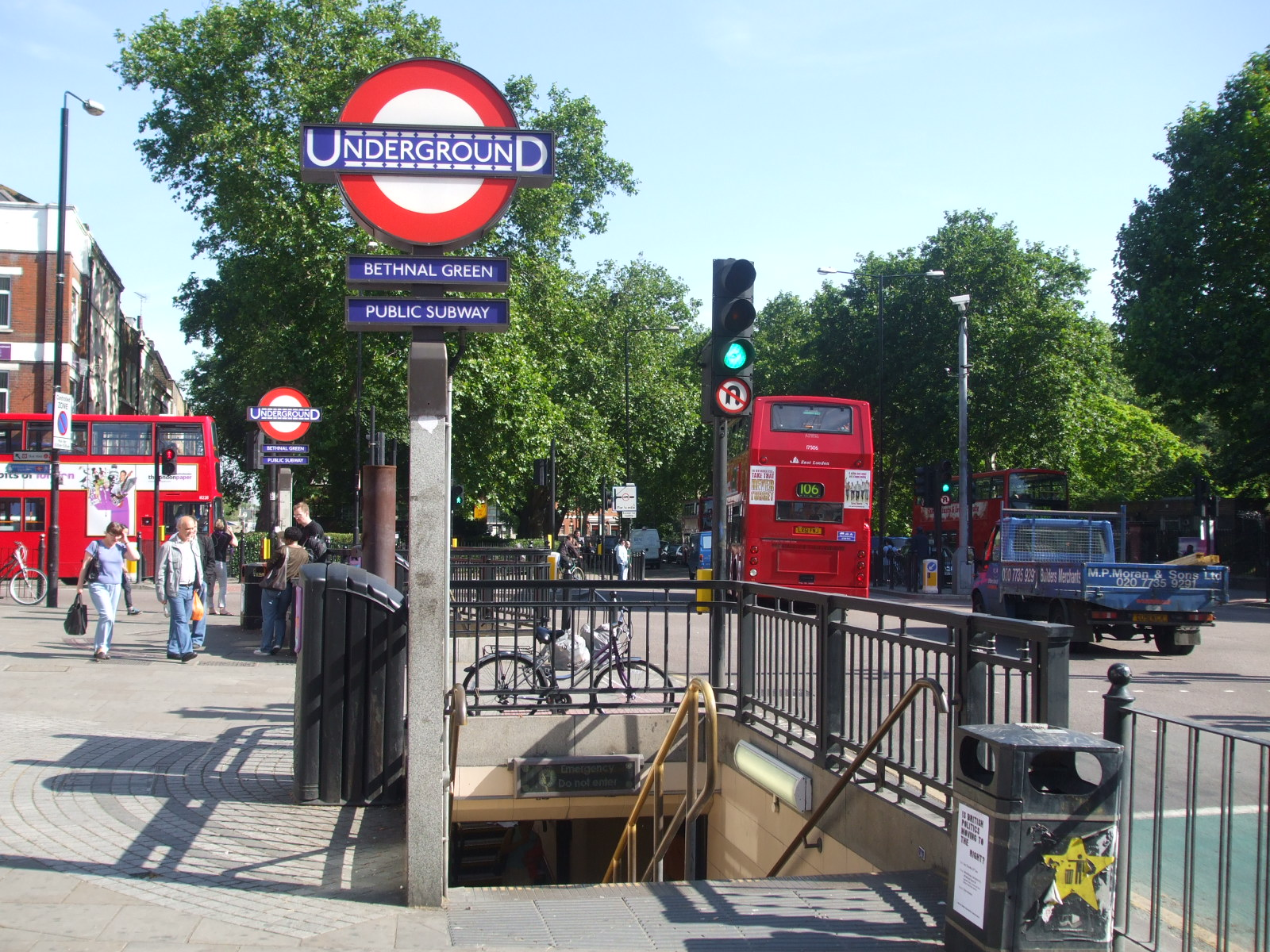
Bethnal Green, the area where Maureen Paley has her gallery.

In 1984, Paley began a gallery programme in her Victorian terraced house. During the late 1980s, she exhibited examples of contemporary art by Tim Rollins and K.O.S., Sarah Charlesworth, Charles Ray, Mike Kelley, Michelangelo Pistoletto and Günther Förg.

=== 1990s ===
In the early 1990s, the gallery presented several exhibitions made by the burgeoning group of artists that were to become known as the YBAs—including, Henry Bond, Angela Bulloch and Liam Gillick. For years she exhibited work by Gillian Wearing and Wolfgang Tillmans.

She was called by Time Out "a true pioneer of the East End", having presented work there before it was fashionable. For almost a decade, the gallery was supported by Arts Council grants and other patronage.

In September 1999, the gallery moved to Herald Street in Bethnal Green, occupying "a chic new industrial space." Paley's base in the area was a precedent for leading galleries such as White Cube and Victoria Miro to also locate in the East End."

Curated exhibitions

In 1994, Paley curated a show at Camden Arts Centre of work by Joseph Kosuth, Ad Reinhardt and Félix González-Torres. In 1995, she presented Wall to Wall featuring wall drawings by artists including Daniel Buren, Michael Craig-Martin, Douglas Gordon, Barbara Kruger, Sol LeWitt, and Lawrence Weiner. The National Touring Exhibitions show went to the Serpentine Gallery, London, Southampton City Art Gallery, and Leeds City Art Gallery. In 1996, for the Henry Moore Sculpture Trust, Paley curated The Cauldron, an exhibition of work by Young British Artists—Christine Borland, Angela Bulloch, Jake and Dinos Chapman, Steven Pippin, Georgina Starr and Gillian Wearing. It was installed in the Trust's studio space in Dean Clough, Halifax.

=== 2000s ===
In 2000, Paley staged The Agony and the Ecstasy, the first show of Rebecca Warren, who she met after Paley had given a talk at her art school.

She said in 2001, "Being a tastemaker—someone who invents the future—requires a delicate balance. You need to be of your time—if you're too far ahead you'll be misunderstood."

In 2004, the gallery's name was changed from Interim Art to Maureen Paley. In 2006, when asked why many women have been successful in contemporary art dealing, Paley said,

Art is one of the last unregulated markets. There are no male gatekeepers and you are not confined to traditional alpha-male values. That makes it very attractive to a certain type of woman with a strong personality, who wouldn't fit into a cookie-cutter working environment [...].

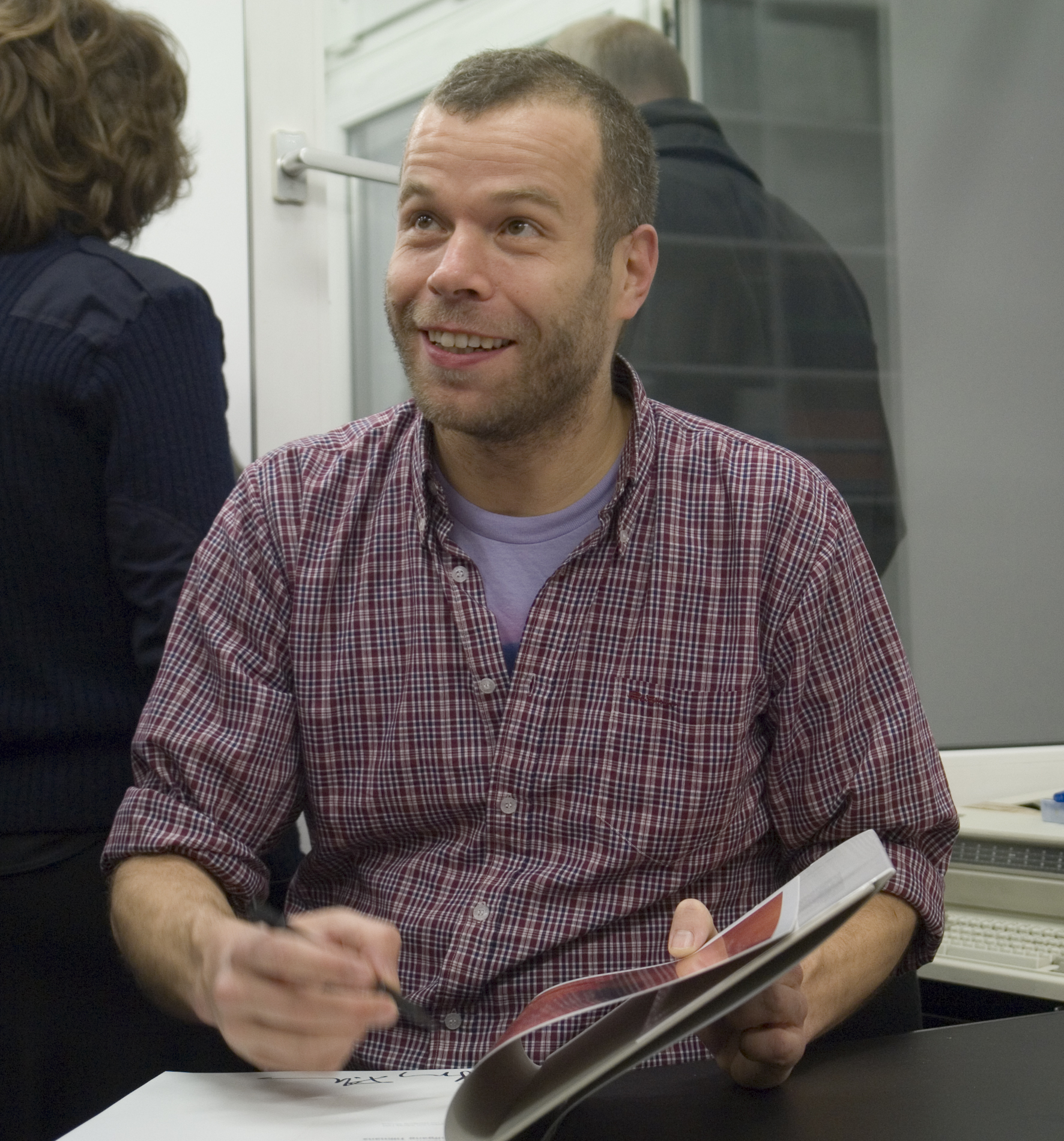
The Turner Prize winner Wolfgang Tillmans, represented by Maureen Paley

Paley was one of the judges of New Sensations, a competition for art students promoted by Channel 4 and the Saatchi Gallery. Jo Craven said in The Daily Telegraph that Paley was one of only five female gallery owners of note in London.

In August 2009, reflecting on the legacy of the YBA art scene, Paley said, "The thing that came out of the YBA generation was boldness, a belief that you can do anything."

In 2009, Paley was elected to the executive committee of the Society of London Art Dealers.

=== 2010s- ===
In 2010, Paley was one of a group of art dealers including Sadie Coles who made up the selection committee for the Frieze Art Fair. The gallery also takes part in Condo, an exhibition series where host galleries collaborate and share their spaces with visiting galleries.

Maureen Paley opened a space in Hove called Morena di Luna in 2017

=== 2020s- ===
In recent years, Paley created two new gallery spaces, Studio M at Rochelle School near Shoreditch in 2021 and in 2025, she opened an additional space in Tillmans former East End studio at 4 Herald Street.

Paley was interviewed for the Art Agency, Partners podcast In Other Words in 2020 and an episode of Talk Art in 2022. In 2023, she was invited to deliver the 15th annual Dasha Shenkman Lecture in Contemporary Art at the University of Guelph, Canada.

In 2026, AWITA, the Association of Women in the Arts, launched the biennial The Maureen Paley Award aimed at women and non-binary professionals working in the visual arts.

== Artists ==
Maureen Paley represents numerous living artists, including:

- Lawrence Abu Hamdan
- Felipe Baeza
- Alexandra Bircken
- AA Bronson
- Tom Burr
- Hannah Collins
- Fiona Connor
- Daniel Correa Mejía
- General Idea
- Kaye Donachie
- Chioma Ebinama
- Michaela Eichwald
- Gardar Eide Einarsson
- Liam Gillick
- Andrew Grassie
- Anne Hardy
- Peter Hujar
- Sarah Jones
- Behrang Karimi
- Michael Krebber
- Erik van Lieshout
- Alastair Mackinven
- Merlin James
- Reverend Joyce McDonald
- Deimantas Narkevičius
- Avis Newman
- Seb Patane
- Rory Pilgrim
- Paulo Nimer Pjota
- Paul P.
- Olivia Plender
- Stephen Prina
- Michael Queenland
- Maaike Schoorel
- Hannah Starkey
- Dirk Stewen
- Studio K.O.S.
- Wolfgang Tillmans
- Oscar Tuazon
- Banks Violette
- Rebecca Warren
- Esther Pearl Watson
- Gillian Wearing
- James Welling
- Jane and Louise Wilson

== Other activities ==
Paley supports the programmes of Artists Space, Creative Industries Federation, Open School East, Serpentine Gallery, The Showroom, Studio Voltaire, and White Columns. She is also a patron of Camden Arts Centre, Chisenhale Gallery, ICA, London, Michael Clark Company, South London Gallery, Tate, Artangel, the Whitechapel Gallery, Charleston, Peer, and Pallant House Gallery, as well as a supporter of the Gallery Climate Coalition (GCC).

== Recognition ==
The Evening Standard included Paley in London's 50 most influential people in art and design in 2008 and 2009.

In 2009, Paley was placed at 87 (from 70 the previous year) in ArtReview's art world Power 100 list; the citation drew attention to the presence of gallery artists at major events, such as Rebecca Warren at the Serpentine Gallery and Wolfgang Tillmans at the Venice Biennale.

In 2022, the gallery was listed as one of the '15 best art galleries in London.'
