= Emily Tsingou =

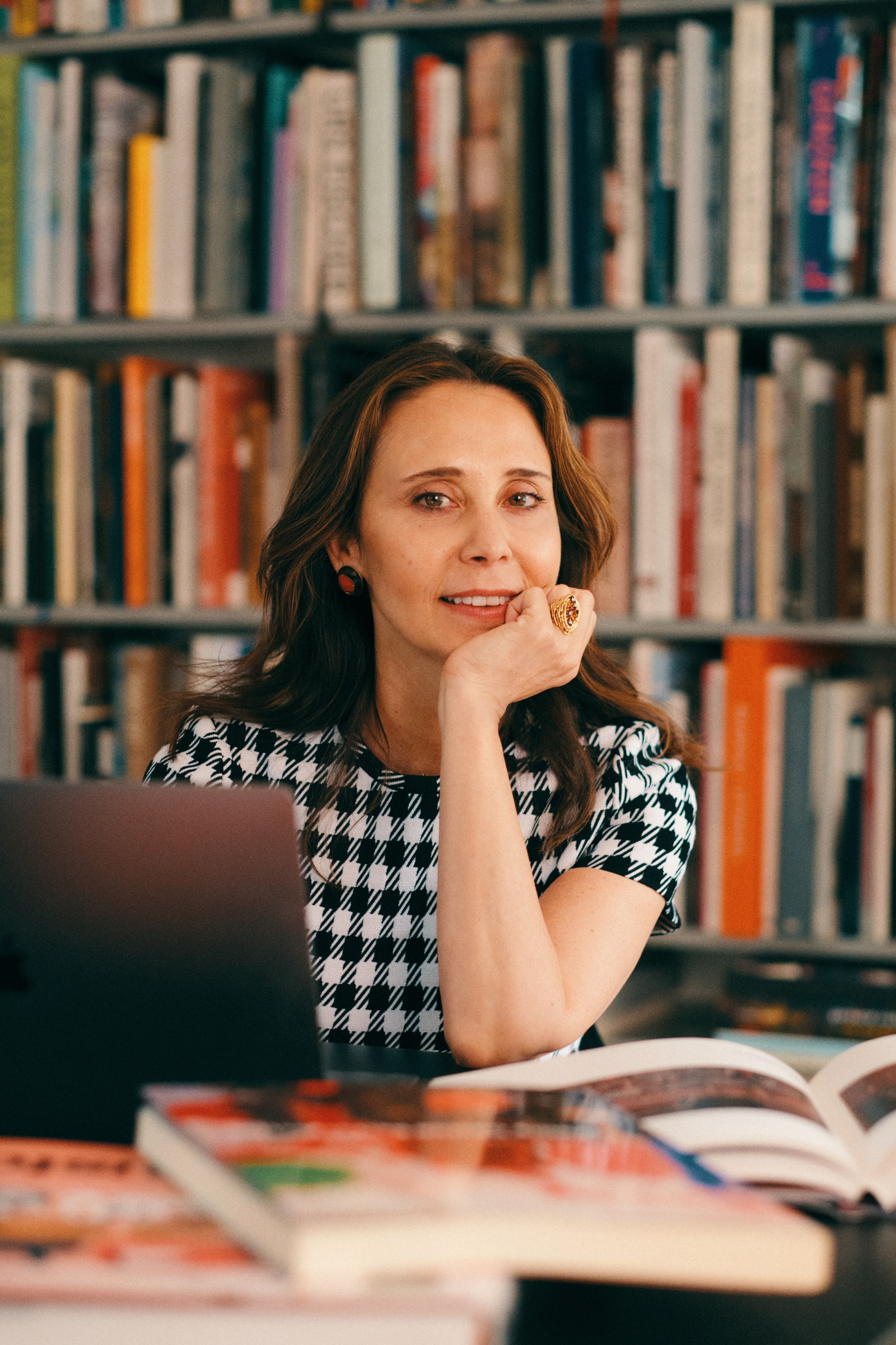
- Photograph by Jamie Stoker.

Emily Tsingou (born 1968, Athens, Greece) is a private collection’s curator and adviser who lives in London, England. She is the former proprietor of Emily Tsingou Gallery which was open 1998 through 2007.

== Career ==
Tsingou completed a Masters (MA) in Art History at the Courtauld Institute of Art. After opening in 1998, Emily Tsingou Gallery established a reputation as a contemporary fine arts gallery, presenting a series of contemporary art exhibitions between 1998 and 2007, in London, England. The gallery's programme, which was selected by Tsingou, introduced the work of certain internationally recognised contemporary artists to the London art scene, including Karen Kilimnik and Jim Shaw (artist), through both solo and group shows.

After a decade of exhibitions at the gallery, Tsingou chose to concentrate solely on curating a select number of collectors and founded Emily Tsingou Fine Art. The agency represents both individuals and foundations, including Miel de Botton’s Berrydown Foundation, the Harry David Art Collection and the private art collection of collector Bobby Arora.. Tsingou is often cited in this capacity, commenting on contemporary art world news and trends, such as artist-gallery relations and the global art fair landscape, for publications including the Financial Times, The Art Newspaper, CNN and Vanity Fair. She was included in the Financial Times article "The who’s who of art advisers" and named in Cultured magazine’s 2026 "Power Advisor" list. In 2014, Tsingou worked as the coordinator for the Museum Partnership Collection. Tsingou has chaired talks at events such as “20/20 Vision” at Phillips Auction House, organised by the Association of Women in the Arts.

Tsingou is an advocate for the London public arts community, supporting institutions including Tate and the Michael Clark Company as a patron, and sitting on the board of trustees for The Showroom, a contemporary art space focused on collaborative approaches to cultural production.
