= Art Monthly =

Contemporary art magazine

ART MONTHLY
- Editor: Patricia Bickers
- Categories: Visual arts magazines
- Frequency: Monthly (10 issues per year)
- Founder: Jack Wendler and Peter Townsend
- First issue: 1976
- Country: United Kingdom
- Language: English
- Website: www.artmonthly.co.uk
- ISSN: 0142-6702

Art Monthly is a magazine of contemporary art founded in 1976 by Jack Wendler and Peter Townsend. It is based in London and has an international scope, although its main focus is on British art. The magazine is published ten times a year (with double issues in the summer and winter) and is Britain's longest-established contemporary art magazine. In June 2017 Art Monthly became a registered charity, and is published by the Art Monthly Foundation.

Regular items in Art Monthly include artist interviews, feature articles, an editorial opinion column, news briefings, exhibition reviews, book reviews, an art-law column and exhibition listings. Other items include artist profiles, reviews of artists' books, films, performance, and reports from particular events such as festivals, conferences and biennales as well as ‘Letter From' articles from all parts of the world.

2007 saw the publication, in association with Ridinghouse, of volume 1 of Talking Art: Interviews with Artists Since 1976, published to celebrate the magazine's 30th anniversary, followed by volume 2, Interviews with Artists Since 2007, on the occasion of its 40th. The Talking Art books are an indispensable resource, comprising the best of Art Monthly's interviews since the magazine's inception in the early 1970s. Together these volumes provide a supplementary history of 20th-century and 21st-century art from the perspectives of over 315 artists and critics. The interviews provide the most immediate access to an artist's thought processes, often at highly significant moments in their careers, and offer narratives of the changing creative process.

In addition, Art Monthly has a regular monthly Art Monthly Talk Show radio programme on Resonance FM, all podcasts being made available on the Art Monthly website, which also includes podcasts of other live events including interviews and panel discussions.
