= CAPC musée d'art contemporain de Bordeaux =

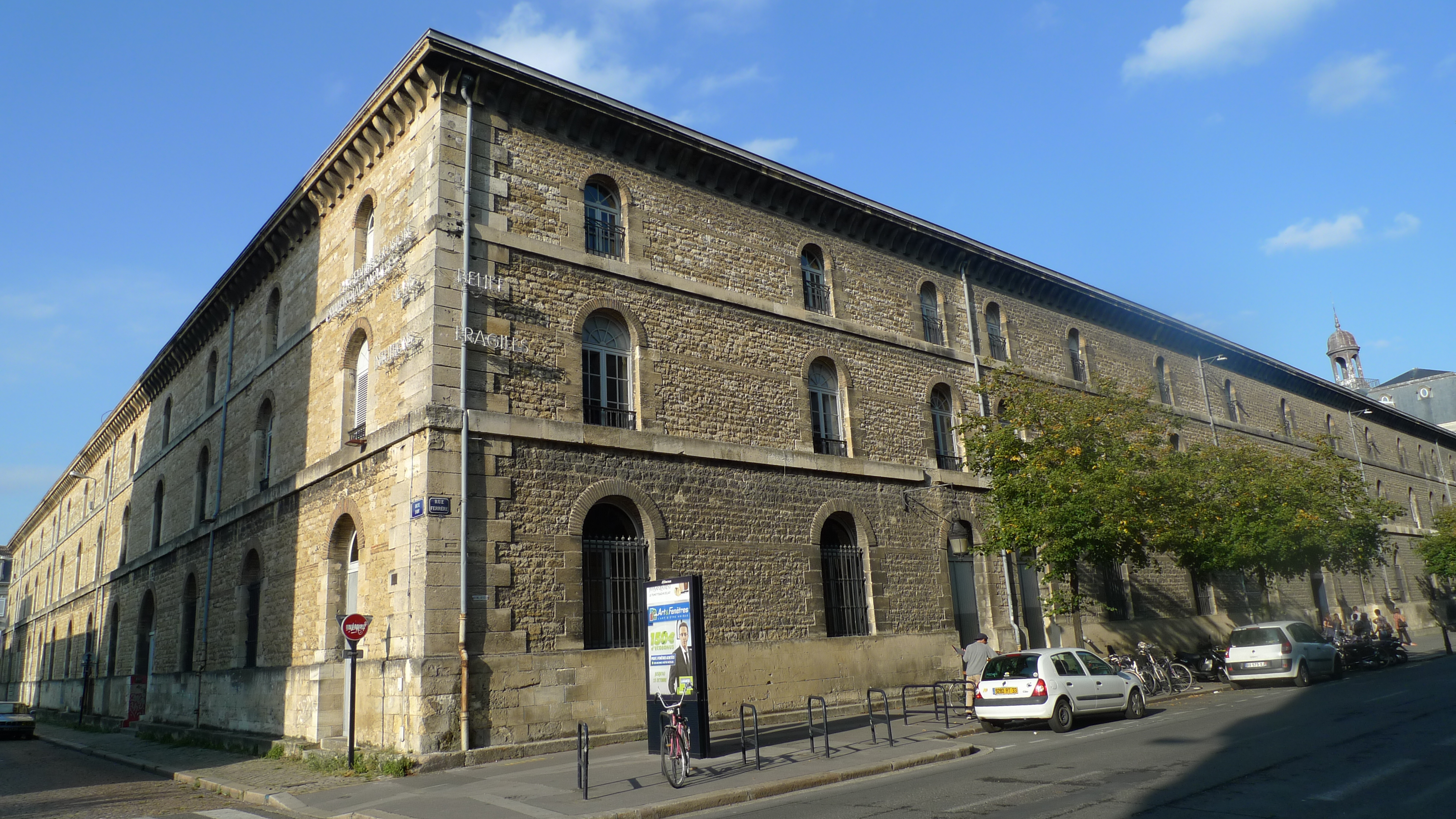
- Lainé warehouse, home to the CAPC

- Location within France
- Established: 1973
- Location: 7 rue Ferrère, Bordeaux, France
- Coordinates: 44.8481°N 0.5718°W
- Type: Museum of contemporary art
- Website: www.capc-bordeaux.fr

CAPC musée d'art contemporain de Bordeaux, formerly the Centre d'arts plastiques contemporains (CAPC), is a museum of modern art established in 1973 in Bordeaux, France.

== Building ==
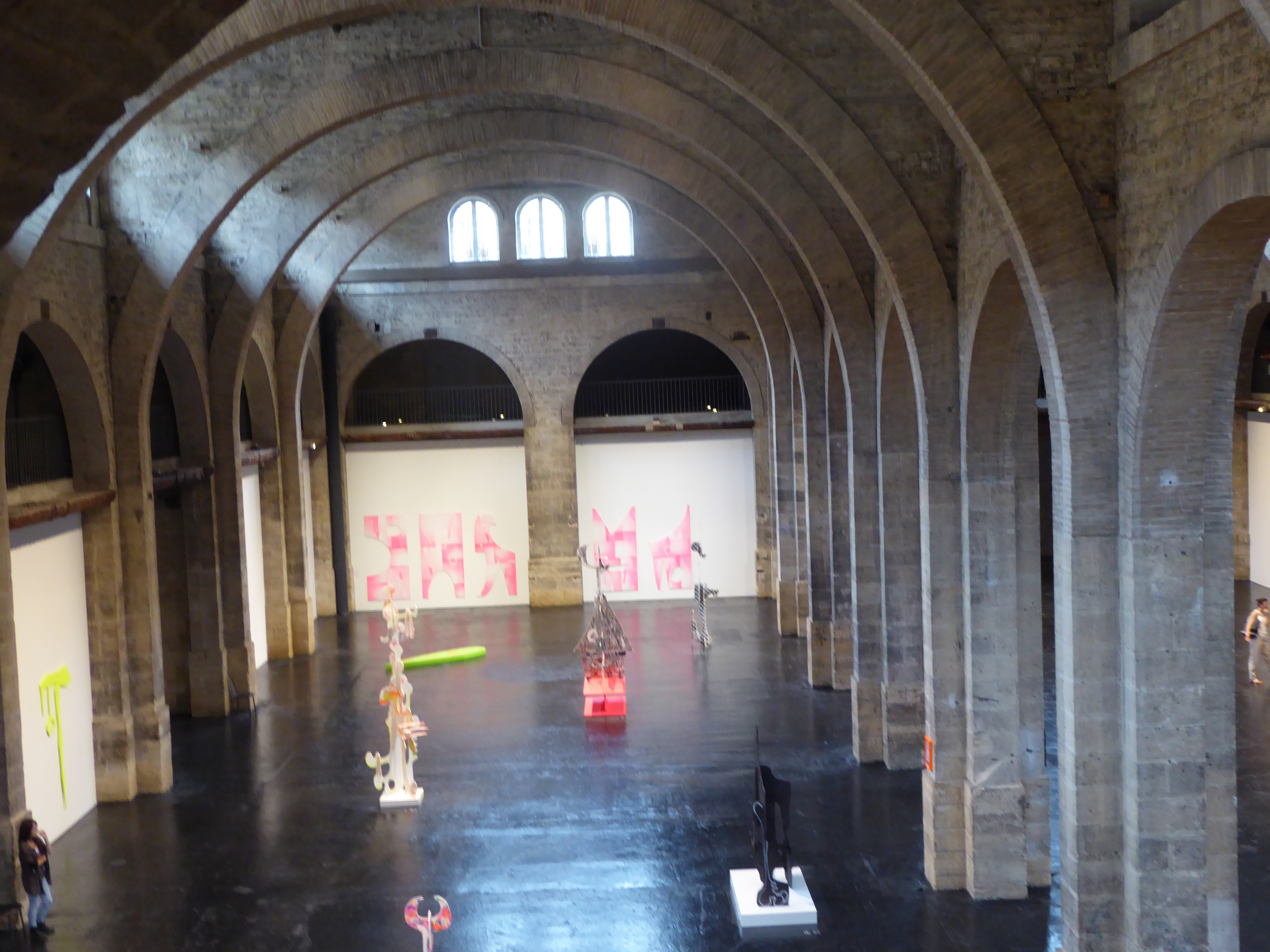
CAPC interior, one of the two naves, July 2014

The museum is housed in the Entrepôt Lainé, a former warehouse for colonial goods (sugar, coffee, cocoa, cotton, spices and oils) which were then re-exported to northern Europe by Bordeaux merchants. The warehouse was built in 1824 by the architect Claude Deschamps, known for the construction of the Pont de pierre of Bordeaux. It is built of brick, stone and wood in a style inspired by Italian architecture. There are two grand naves that are reminiscent of the Roman basilicas and that are used to present temporary exhibitions. The building was restored by the architects Denis Valode and Jean Pistre in the 1980s, the second project that this architectural team had undertaken. Their treatment was unusual for the time, emphasizing shadows and depth.

The designer Andrée Putman renovated the interior. The Café Putman, named after the decorator, has a minimalist decor of metal, concrete and natural materials such as teak and wicker. It has a terrace.

Since 1981, the building also hosts Arc en rêve centre d'architecture, association that organises exhibitions and knowledge exchange about architecture, urban development, landscape and design.

== Centre d'arts plastiques contemporains ==
In 1965, Roger Lafosse created the Sigma Festival in Bordeaux, an avant-garde festival of visual and performance arts. In 1973, he installed Sigma in the Entrepôt Lainé. The Centre d'Arts Plastiques Contemporains (CAPC) was founded by Jean-Louis Froment. In 1973, CAPC held its first contemporary art exhibition called Regarder ailleurs (Look Elsewhere). By 1974, CAPC had moved into the warehouse.

The first exhibitions included artists such as Gina Pane, Andy Warhol and Christian Boltanski. They quickly established the venue as one of the leading places dedicated to contemporary visual arts. Two theater companies joined Sigma and CAPC, as well as the architecture center Arc en rêve. CAPC presented new avant-garde work in group exhibitions, and was gradually discovered by the public.

== Musée d'art contemporain ==
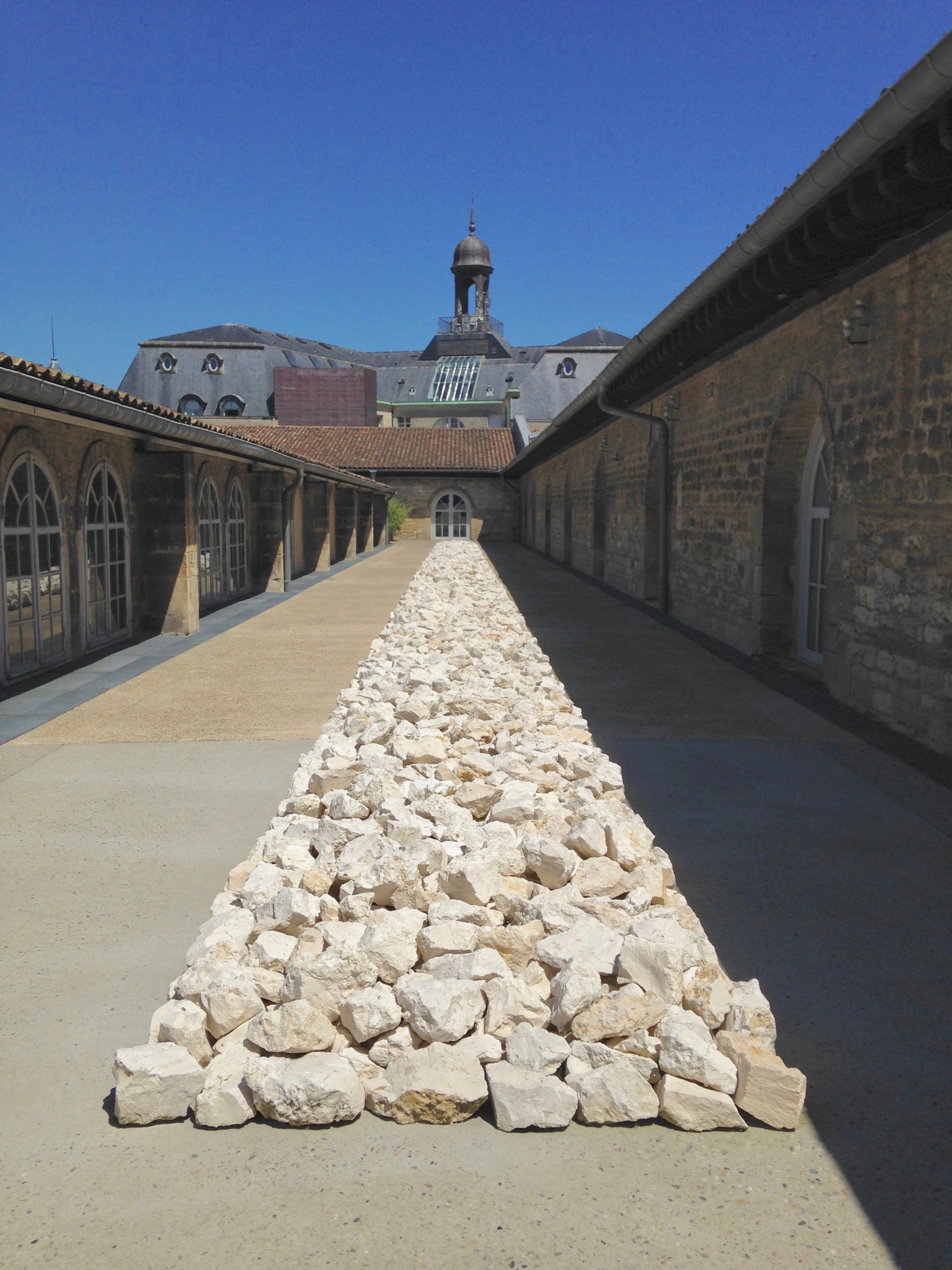
White Rock Line (1990), by Richard Long, permanent land art on the rooftop

In 1983, the institution became the CAPC Musée d'art contemporain de Bordeaux (Bordeaux Museum of Contemporary Art). The museum was formally opened on 17 May 1984. During the 1980s, the museum put on many exhibitions and events, and also arranged exhibitions in California, Spain and then throughout Europe and Japan with the exhibition of the Sonnabend Collection.

American artist Keith Haring had a major exhibition in the museum in 1985, creating a series of ten large paintings, The Ten Commandments, to fit exactly the nave of the museum building. The ten paintings have since been displayed at various other locations. Haring did leave the museum a mural painting inside the elevator shaft.

In 1990, the CAPC Musée and the arc en rêve architecture center occupied the entire warehouse, which was reopened after renovations in June 1990. In the years that followed the museum has steadily added to its collection, with assistance from the state. The focus was enlarged from Europe and North America to cover work from Asia, South America and emerging countries. In 2003, the museum was designated a National Museum of France.

The CAPC museum presents permanent exhibitions of its collection and organizes large temporary exhibitions on specific themes. It often features artists who work in the Bordeaux region. Since 2000, the museum has frequently been used for exhibitions of music, architecture, cinema, literature or design, and has often put on exhibitions of popular art.

By order of January 19, 2021, the Center of Contemporary Art of National Interest label is awarded to capc.

== Directors ==
- Jean-Louis Froment, 1973–1996
- Henry-Claude Cousseau, assisted by Marie-Laure Bernadac, 1997–2000
- Maurice Fréchuret, 2001–2006
- Charlotte Laubard, 2006–2013
- María Inés Rodríguez 2014–2018
- Sandra Patron 2019-Current

== Links ==
- CAPC-Bordeaux website

== Sources ==
- "30 ans d'expos" (in French). Bordeaux. Archived from the original on 2009-03-31.
- Auzias, Dominique; Labourdette, Jean-Paul (2012-06-19). Les 100 plus beaux musées de France 2012 (avec photos et avis des lecteurs). Petit Futé. ISBN 978-2-7469-5399-4.
- Rambert, Francis (2005-01-01). "A Culture of Use Specific Design". Valode and Pistre Architectes. Images Publishing. ISBN 978-1-920744-53-3.
