= Culture in Action =

Art exhibition, Chicago 1993

- Time: May - September 1993
- Location: Chicago
- Theme: Public art
- Patrons: Sculpture Chicago; National Endowment for the Arts
- Organised by: Mary Jane Jacob
- Participants: artists: Iñigo Manglano-Ovalle; Daniel Joseph Martinez; Suzanne Lacy; Kate Ericson; Mel Ziegler; Haha artist group; Robert Peters; Mark Dion; Simon Grennan; Christopher Sperandio; and thousands of Chicagoans

Culture in Action was an art exhibition that took place in Chicago from May to September 1993. It was a landmark event in the development of public art.

== Exhibition ==
Mary Jane Jacob, the curator of the exhibition, originally conceived it in 1991, inspired by David Hammons' House of the Future from the 1991 Spoleto Festival USA, which she also curated.

The exhibition, which cost $800,000, was sponsored by nonprofit organization Sculpture Chicago and financially supported by the National Endowment for the Arts and various private groups. The program consisted of eight separate projects, each of them developed over an extended period of time.

The exhibition was originally titled New Urban Monuments, but was renamed upon the suggestion of artist Daniel Martinez. The renaming reflected a conceptual shift from static to dynamic public art.

== Artists ==
All the artists were activists that engaged in collaborations and none were known as object-makers. Aside from Lacy's boulders, all the projects took place in working-class or poor neighborhoods.

Iñigo Manglano-Ovalle organized a block party in West Town displaying local young people's videos. Daniel Joseph Martinez made an installation with the granite blocks of a destroyed plaza. Together with 800 volunteers from Mexican-American and black neighborhoods, Martinez created a joint parade between the neighborhoods. Suzanne Lacy distributed 100 boulders with the names of local women of distinction around the Chicago Loop. Kate Ericson and Mel Ziegler asked the residents of a housing project to help them design a paint chart with the colors named after the events in the history of public housing, such as Cabrini Green or Pruitt-Igoe Dust. The Haha artist group created a hydroponic garden for AIDS volunteers in a storefront in Rogers Park. Robert Peters collected Chicago slurs in a survey and made them available as recordings on a publicized toll-free telephone number. Mark Dion and his team made micro-expeditions to the Lincoln Park Zoo, the lagoon and the surrounding park, collected samples and displayed them in a Lincoln Park indoor site. Finally, Simon Grennan, Christopher Sperandio and twelve factory workers made "The Candy of Their Dreams," a chocolate bar with almonds.

== Reactions ==
The event was criticized by some for its often superficial approach to complex problems and for addressing issues that are better addressed by social services. Others hailed it as one of the most important public art events in North America in the twentieth century. Frieze commented: "Culture in Action framed its artists, its communities and its viewers themselves as the structure and content of its art."
