= Fariba Hajamadi =

Iranian-American visual artist (born 1957)

- فریبا حجامدی
- Born: 1957 (age 68–69); Isfahan, Imperial State of Iran
- Education: Western Michigan University (BFA), California Institute of the Arts (MFA)
- Occupations: Painter, photographer, installation artist
- Website: www.faribahajamadi.com

Fariba Hajamadi (Persian: فریبا حجامدی; born 1957) is an Iranian-born American painter, installation artist, and photographer. Her work is created on fabric, canvas, and wood panels, often presented as large scale installations. Hajamadi work investigates cultural and gender Identity, as well as narratives of displacement, and dissects the cultural institution from the point of view of a cultural outsider both as a woman and as someone born in a non-Western culture. She lives in New York City.

== Background ==
Fariba Hajamadi was born in 1957, in Isfahan, Pahlavi Iran.

She left Iran in 1976, to pursue fine arts studies and received her BFA degree in painting from Western Michigan University. Hajamadi subsequently received her MFA degree at the California Institute of the Arts (Cal Arts), studying under Jonathan Borofsky, and first generation conceptual artists John Baldessari, Michael Asher. Her fellow students included Ashley Bickerton, Christopher Williams, Kate Ericson, Mel Ziegler and Bill Wurtz.

== Artwork ==
The starting point, for Hajamadi, is her photographs of the interiors of institutions devoted to the preservation of art and culture. Her large scale works are a seamless collage made by compositing multiple layers of photographs, of the same location from different vantage points or by combining different locations. A new interior with a forced symmetry and perspective allows the viewer to see an interior from the center and the periphery at the same time. Her architectural interiors are fictional, dense with meaning, and have a quality of displacement that verges on the surreal. Her work where the line between photography and painting are blurred engages the viewer in a discourse on cultural identities, representation of the female, photography and historical truths. Since the 1980s, Fariba Hajamadi has been producing artworks that set out to diagram and re-construct the Western narrative of the “Other". Her use of such critical tactics began before they had entered the mainstream of contemporary artistic practice. Hajamadi began by examining the museum as the locus of Occidental civilization's reading of non-Western forms and practices. Hajamadi tacitly declared it to be something like the scene of a perpetual crime against humanity, insofar as it enshrines the trophies of a deep cultural misunderstanding.

In her site specific installations Hajamadi created a series of wallpapers, reminiscent of toile de Jouy, with four themes Hunt, War, Eros and Rape... Hajamadi's art practice has been described as a hybrid of photography, painting and installation.

== Exhibition ==
Hajamadi has exhibited her work and installations in the United States and internationally since mid 1980s. Some of her solo exhibitions include: Musée de La Roche-sur-Yon, ICA Philadelphia, Queens Museum. Rhona Hoffman Gallery Chicago, Christine Burgin New York, Gallerie Laage-Salomon, Paris, Maureen Paley London.

== Group exhibitions ==
Hajamadi has participated in numerous group exhibitions throughout her career. Some of these include:

- Departure Lounge, MoMA PS1, New York
- Fake, The New Museum, New York
- Transmute, Museum of Contemporary Art, Chicago
- L’Hiver de l’Amour, MAM/ARC Musée d’Art Moderne de Paris
- Echolot, Museum Fridericianum, Kassel, Germany
- Strange Home, Museum August Kestner, Hannover, Germany
- Remote Connections, Wäinö Aaltonen Museum of Art, Turku, Finland
- Ecbatana, Nikolaj Copenhagen Contemporary Art Center, Copenhagen, Denmark
- Remote Connections, Neue Galerie Graz, Austria
- ORIENT/ATION, Fourth Biennial of Istanbul, Istanbul, Turkey
- Altrove fra immagine e identità, Museo d'Arte Contemporanea, Prato

== Literature ==
- Ulla Angkjær Jørgensen, Exploring the Black Venus Figure in Aesthetic Practices, ISBN 978-9004395206. p178-182
- Dan Cameron, Reconciling Opposites, Museum Fridericianum, Kassel, Germany. ISBN 3-927015-09-1. 32 p.
- Joshua Decter, Fariba Hajamadi: The Invention of Disappearance, Musée de La Roche-sur-Yon, France ISBN 2908117428. 18 p.
- Joshua Decter, The Invisible Mirror of Memory, Galeries Magazine N^{o}36 APR/MAY 1990. 108-109
- Gary Indiana Fariba Hajamadi, ICA, Philadelphia
- Chris Dercon, A Different corner, Museo de Arte Moderno, Cuenca, Ecuador
- Rosetta Brooks, Fariba Hajamadi: 20/20 Vision, CEPA Journal, Winter
