= Iñigo Manglano-Ovalle =

American conceptual artist

- Born: 1961 (age 64–65); Madrid, Spain
- Education: School of the Art Institute of Chicago, Williams College
- Known for: Conceptual art, Installation art, Sculpture, Video, Photography
- Awards: MacArthur Foundation, John Simon Guggenheim Memorial Foundation, National Endowment for the Arts
- Website: Iñigo Manglano-Ovalle

Iñigo Manglano-Ovalle, Well 35°58'16"N – 106°5'21"W (site-specific land art, Santa Clara Pueblo, NM, 2014). Pictured: Iñigo Manglano-Ovalle.

Iñigo Manglano-Ovalle (born 1961, Madrid, Spain) is an American conceptual artist known for multidisciplinary, socially oriented sculpture, video and installations and urban community-based projects of the 1990s. His work often explores a dialectical relationships involving minimalist aesthetics, the utopian ambitions of modernism and science, and the resulting—often negative—social, geopolitical and ecological consequences of such ideologies. New York Times critic Holland Cotter wrote that Manglano-Ovalle was adept in "distilling complex ideas into inviting visual metaphors," while Jody Zellen described his work as "infused with a formal elegance and sociopolitical content." Manglano-Ovalle has been featured in solo exhibitions at the Art Institute of Chicago, MASS MoCA, Museo Tamayo Arte Contemporaneo and Museum of Contemporary Art, Chicago (MCA), and participated in Documenta 12, the Venice Biennale, Whitney Biennial, and Bienal de São Paulo. He has been recognized with MacArthur Foundation, Guggenheim, and National Endowment for the Arts fellowships and his work belongs to the collections of forty major institutions. He has been a professor at Northwestern University since 2012 and lives and works in Chicago.

== Life and career ==
Manglano-Ovalle was born in Madrid and raised in Bogotá, Colombia and Chicago, Illinois. He received BA degrees in art and art history and Latin American and Spanish literature from Williams College (1983), before earning an MFA in Sculpture from the School of the Art Institute of Chicago (SAIC) in 1989. He exhibited actively during graduate school, at alternatives spaces such as Randolph Street Gallery and Hyde Park Art Center, and quickly became part of a burgeoning conceptual scene in Chicago that sought to address political issues in non-didactic ways. Since that time, he has had major solo exhibitions at the Art Institute of Chicago (2010, 2005, 1999), MASS MoCA (2009), Rochester Art Center (2006), Krefelder Kunstmuseen (2005), Museo de Arte Contemporáneo de Monterrey (2004), Museo Tamayo Arte Contemporaneo (2003), MCA, Chicago (1997, 1993), Christopher Grimes Gallery (1998–2017, Santa Monica), Max Protetch Gallery (1998–2010, New York), and Galerie Thomas Schulte (2006–17), among others. He has also appeared in group exhibitions at the Museum of Modern Art, Solomon R. Guggenheim Museum, and Guggenheim Museum Bilbao.

== Work ==
Iñigo Manglano-Ovalle, Video still from Le Baiser (1999).

Manglano-Ovalle's diverse work is connected by its interest in probing the underlying forces, systems and histories that shape and describe contemporary identity, ethics, aesthetics, climate, and politics. His early projects employed multi-faceted, community-oriented strategies to explore cultural identity, migration and immigration, social and geographic boundaries, and urban violence. His later work evolved in a more conceptual direction, initiating wider sociopolitical dialogues on culture, science and technology, ecosystems, and geopolitics.

=== Community-oriented and socially-focused projects (1990s) ===
Manglano-Ovalle's early work was rooted in localized communities and the personal experience of living between cultures. For Assigned Identity Project (1990), he worked with a West Town, Chicago community center, fusing art (scaled-up green cards, fingerprints and topographical maps examining identity and categorization) with community service teaching a practical course on amnesty and federal (INS) practices. His Tele-Vecindario (1993) was part of the pioneering, Mary Jane Jacob-curated "Culture in Action" social practice event, and gained him widespread attention. He collaborated with a group of neighboring at-risk Latino teens, leading to the formation of Street-Level Video, a training collective that empowered youths to articulate street culture and community concerns about gang activity, gentrification, social control and cultural fragmentation. The project developed into a sprawling dialogue on residential social space, presented at public screenings, a 71-monitor, 46-video block party (involving the collaboration of four rival gangs), and video installations created in conjunction with the MCA Chicago.

Manglano-Ovalle explored similar issues in early sculpture and installations incorporating unorthodox elements, such as suspended inner tubes evoking the iconic bolsa (raft) (Flotilla, 1991), actual rafts (Balsero, 1994), car sound systems (Subwoofer, 1995), or a 1964 Chevy Impala (Flora and Fauna, 1997) referencing low-rider car culture. Critics described his minimalist installation, Bloom (1995–6), as a subversively seductive yet repulsive meditation on violence; it consisted of Plexiglas cases on spare metal tables containing luminous blocks of ballistic gelatin replicating human flesh, into which hollow-point bullets were fired. The transitional Note on Levitating the U.S. Pentagon or How to Operate a Car Jack (1996) foreshadowed his growing conceptual and political focus; it featured 195 hydraulic jacks arranged in a pentagonal formation, referencing low-rider culture, the minimalism of Robert Morris, and 1960s Happenings and protests.

Iñigo Manglano-Ovalle, Gravity Is a Force To Be Reckoned With (steel, glass, wood, mixed media; 25' x 25' x 13'). Installation view, MASS MoCA (2009).

=== Conceptual work: sculpture, video and installations (1997— ) ===
Manglano-Ovalle's later projects often use natural or modernist cultural forms as metaphors to consider social systems involving identity, science and technology, politics and war. He transforms research and data from many disciplines (engineering, architecture, genomics, climatology, astrophysics) into technologically sophisticated, often minimalist sculptures, videos and installations. The Garden of Delights (1998) re-visualized genetic coding in order to examine its potential use in the representation, portrayal and categorization of identity. It featured forty-eight life-size depictions of human DNA samples, presented in triptychs resembling vibrant, color-field abstraction whose visual similarity evinced common lineage despite representing individuality. Heavenly Bodies (2003) translated genetic coding into cloud motifs, whose celestial immateriality undermined notions of certainty associated with DNA testing.

Iñigo Manglano-Ovalle, Cloud Prototype No. 1, fiberglass and titanium alloy foil, (2003).

In several projects, Manglano-Ovalle investigated intersections of cultural systems, such as modernism, with politics, science, and nature. The video-installation trilogy Le Baiser/The Kiss (1999), Climate (2000) and In Ordinary Time (2001)—all set in Mies van der Rohe buildings—and Always After (The Glass House) (2006) engage the beauty, ambitions and failings of modernism as well as interrelated environmental, geopolitical, class and social issues; New York Times critic Ken Johnson called them "sleek and suspenseful video installations that meditate on modern technocracy." Manglano-Ovalle revisited these themes in a Whitney Museum show he designed ("Mies in America," 2001) and Gravity Is a Force To Be Reckoned With (MASS MoCA, 2009), in which he reconstructed van der Rohe's never-built House with Four Columns (1951)—a square, open- walled glass structure—at half scale (25 x 25 feet) and inverted, with its furniture and partition walls installed upside down from the ceiling (the original's home's floor).

In The Krefeld Suite (2005) Manglano-Ovalle focused on the tectonic, plateau-like structure of icebergs, staging interventions in two van der Rohe villas to connect modernist architectural forms and natural forms and forces. Iceberg (r11i01) (2005), a 25-foot sculpture consisting of a matrix of more than 1,600 aluminum tubes, captured the structure of a once-existing, 460-foot Labrador Sea iceberg from advanced radar and sonar data; juxtaposing the utopian vision of Fuller's geodesic dome (in crumpled form) with the threat of global warming, the sculpture intimated modernism's failure, particularly in another version shown on its side, Recumbent Iceberg (r11i01) (2006).

Iñigo Manglano-Ovalle, Phantom Truck, mixed media, 393" x 98" x 156", (2007).

Three large-scale works employing technical processes of data gathering, modeling and fabrication connect science and political power. Cloud Prototype No. 1 (2003) used atmospheric data to create a gargantuan, amorphous titanium-alloy and fiberglass sculpture capturing the fleeting form of a thundercloud; its frozen quality and resemblance to a nuclear blast cloud evoke liminal, transformative moments between benign and perilous, progress and destruction. Phantom Truck (Documenta 12, 2007) was a physical realization of the biological weapons lab described (but never validated) in Colin Powell's 2003 United Nations speech leading up to the U.S. invasion of Iraq. Manglano-Ovalle built the vaguely industrial, container-like structure using computer renderings based on satellite images, State Department renderings and descriptions in Powell's speech. Displayed in a darkened gallery, the barely visible form was described by curator Elizabeth Armstrong as evoking the shadowy political camouflage that inspired it—"a chilling encounter with a fabrication of a falsehood." Prototype for Re-Entry (2015) is an enlarged (36-foot) version of Brancusi's iconic Bird in Space sculpture suspended in flight that was commissioned for a U.S. Food and Drug Administration building that was once the site of a post-World War II weapons laboratory. It uses the site's historical role and the aesthetics of Brancusi's work as points of departure to investigate the parallel searches of modern art and science/weapons development for perfection; the project included a (successful) aerodynamics test of a reproduction of the sculpture in the site's still-active hypervelocity wind tunnel.

In later multi-component works, Manglano-Ovalle returned to ecological themes, resource extraction and coal and deforestation. His permanent 2013 public work, Weather Field No. 1, is a kinetic array of weather vanes and anemometers for Tongva Park in Santa Monica, California. The installation Well (2014–5) comprises an exhibition and permanent work of land art in Santa Clara Pueblo, New Mexico in which Manglano-Ovalle installed stainless steel hand pumps to manually extract water from aquifers below for public consumption. It explores the issue of water extraction while reframing minimalist and readymade art conventions by maintaining its object's utilitarian function.

== Recognition and collections ==
Manglano-Ovalle has received fellowships from the John Simon Guggenheim Memorial Foundation (2009), MacArthur Foundation (2001), United States Artists (2011), and National Endowment for the Arts (1995), as well as a Wexner Center for the Arts Media Arts Award (1997–2001) and Artadia Award (2008), among others. His work belongs to the public collections of forty institutions, including the Solomon R. Guggenheim Museum, Art Institute of Chicago, Whitney Museum, Berkeley Art Museum and Pacific Film Archive, Library of Congress, Museo de Arte Contemporane (Bilbao), Museo Nacional Centro de Arte Reina Sofia, Museum of Contemporary Art, Chicago, Museum of Contemporary Art San Diego, Museum für Moderne Kunst, National Gallery of Victoria, and Stedelijk Museum voor Actuele Kunst (SMAK).
