= Dale Eldred =

American sculptor (1933–1993)

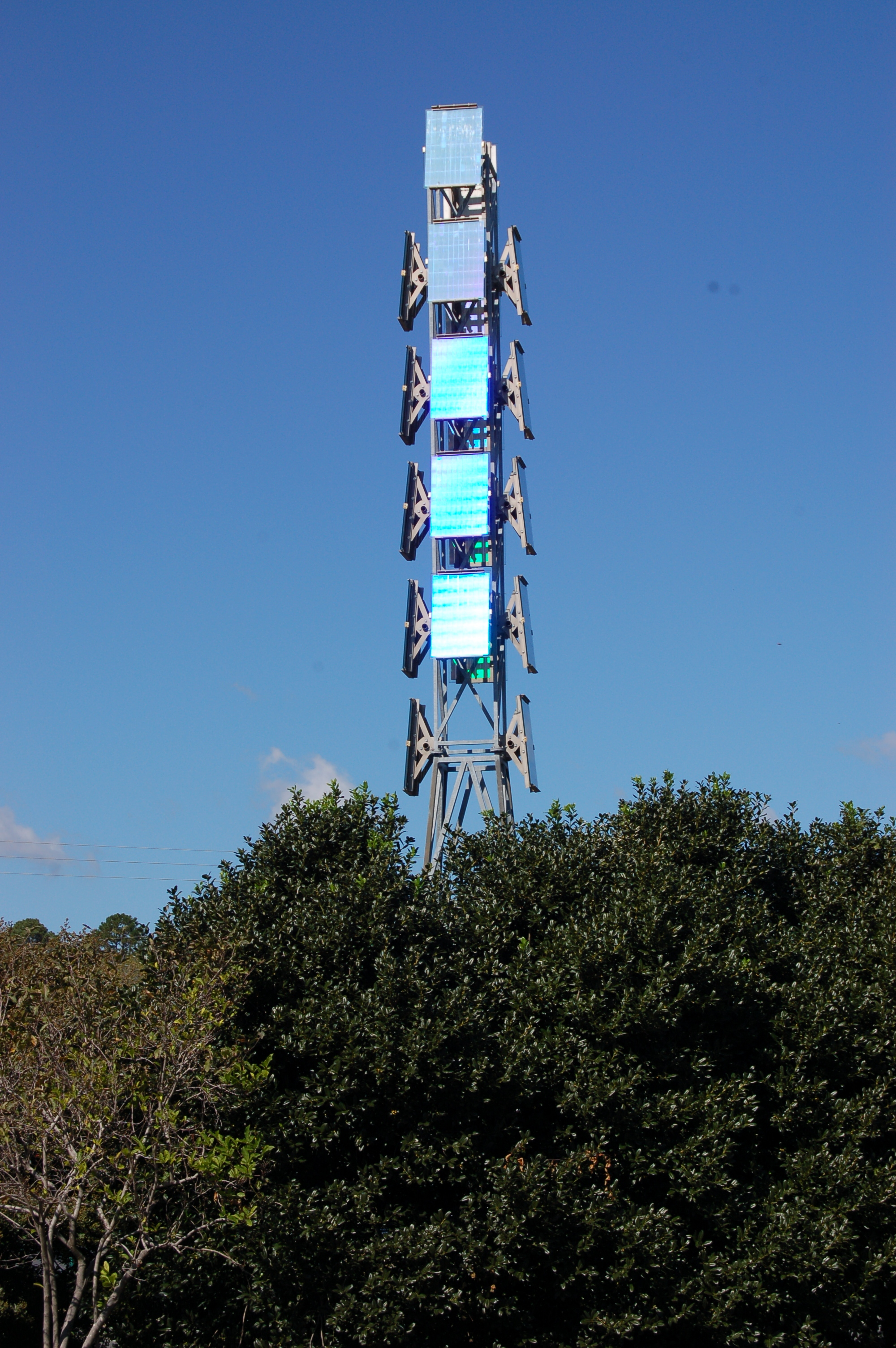
Light+Time Tower, Raleigh, NC

Dale Eldred (November 9, 1933 in Minneapolis, Minnesota – July 26, 1993 in Kansas City, Missouri) was an internationally acclaimed sculptor renowned for large-scale sculptures that emphasized both natural and generated light.

== Biography ==
The grandson of Finnish immigrant builders, Eldred was raised in Minnesota. Eldred moved to Kansas City in 1959, fresh out of the University of Michigan. Within a year, he became chairman of the sculpture department at the Kansas City Art Institute.

Eldred had an imposing physical presence and played fullback in college football. He was known for his resilience in the face of challenges, such as the 1991 fire that destroyed a studio containing his library and many valuable artworks.

Eldred chaired the sculpture department at KCAI for 33 years, exerting a powerful influence on thousands of students, including: James Clover, Gary Freeman, Shawn Brixey, Ming Fay, Michael Rees, John E. Buck, and the collaborative couple, (the late) Kate Ericson and Mel Ziegler who met at KCAI. He was also the artistic director of Biosphere II and a fellow at the Massachusetts Institute of Technology Center for Advanced Visual Studies.

Dale Eldred was killed in the "500-year" flood in the summer of 1993, when the Missouri River inundated parts of Kansas City. He died in a fall while trying to rescue equipment in his West Bottoms-neighborhood studio.

== Sculpture ==
Eldred's early sculptures were large clay works. Influenced by the monumental steel sculptures of David Smith and Alexander Calder, he began to work in steel, wood, and other materials, creating large sculptures and environments. Examples include a sculpture composed of a pair of large cantilevered slabs of wood and steel, placed near the entrance of the Kansas City Art Institute; and a park in northern Kansas City, Missouri, housing a large stone and lumber environment. Critic and artist Donald Judd reviewed his work favorably.

Eldred was commissioned to redesign downtown Kansas City, Kansas. His challenging modernist design included futuristic fountains, irregular streets, and steel curbs. The public received it poorly, and the city modified much of his work, but some aspects still exist today.

Eldred wanted to reveal natural phenomena. He created a towering sculpture in a Kansas City park that sprayed water in order to create prismatic light refractions. His emphasis increasingly focused on light; he used mirrors, pure pigments, gas flames, fluorescent paint, refraction tape, glass, neon tubes and other materials to create light effects. "I want the sculptures to remind us all," he said, "that our lives are inextricably linked to light, and that our universe is in constant motion." He created the Light+Time Tower at the city of Raleigh, North Carolina designed to diffract the morning and afternoon sunlight into vibrant colors visible to the commuters who pass by it. His Steeple of Light, originally proposed by Frank Lloyd Wright for the Community Christian Church in Kansas City, was completed by his partner and collaborator Roberta Lord after Eldred died in 1993 before the sculpture was finalized in 1994.

In collaboration with choreographer Todd Bolender, he created the set and costumes for "Voyager," a ballet performed by the State Ballet of Missouri.

He collaborated with other highly regarded artists and musicians, including composer Philip Glass.

== Commissions, Museums and Private Collections ==
=== United States ===
Arizona

- Time/Light Fusion, 1990, Scottsdale Center for the Arts, Scottsdale
- Time Garden, 1990, Arizona State University, Tempe
- Vision Lens: Light and Future, 1990, Arizona State University, Tempe

Colorado

- Light & Time Labyrinth, 1994 (installed), Auraria Higher Education Center, Denver

Florida

- Solar Time Plane, 1984, Broward County Main Library, Fort Lauderdale
- Light Abacus I, 1990, Criser Hall, Gainesville
- Sun Stations, 1983, Coconut Grove Station, Miami
- Earth and Sky Garden, 1984, University of South Florida, College of Public Health courtyard, Tampa
- "Spectral Field", 1990, University of Central Florida, College of Engineering, Orlando

Illinois

- Urban Time and Light Field, 1985, Cermak Plaza Shopping Center, Berwyn

Iowa

- Landscape Piece #1, 1965, Des Moines Art Center, Des Moines
- Model for Landscape, 1967, Des Moines Art Center, Des Moines

Kansas

- Salina Piece, 1969, University of Kansas, Lawrence
- Untitled, 1968, litho, Spencer Gallery of Art, University of Kansas, Lawrence
- Untitled, 1968, litho, Spencer Gallery of Art, University of Kansas, Lawrence
- Galileo's Garden, 1984, Johnson County Community College, Overland Park

Michigan

- Untitled, 1973, Grand Valley State University, Allendale

Minnesota

- Mankato Piece, 1968, Riverfront Park, Mankato
- Minneapolis Project, 1983, Minneapolis Institute of Arts and other sites, Minneapolis

Missouri

- Heritage Fountain, 1977, Blue Valley Park, Kansas City
- Steeple of Light, 1990–94, Community Christian Church, Kansas City
- Signage, Harry J. Epstein Hardware, Kansas City
- East Gate Piece, 1966, Kansas City Art Institute, Kansas City
- Homage to the Ancients, 1975, print, Kemper Museum of Contemporary Art, Kansas City
- Seven Views of the Grand Canyon, 1985, Kemper Museum of Contemporary Art, Kansas City
- Sculpture II, 1963, Nelson-Atkins Museum of Art, Kansas City
- Standing Iron, 1962, Nelson-Atkins Museum of Art, Kansas City
- Untitled, 1962, University of Missouri-Kansas City, Kansas City
- Sun Field, 1991, Laumeier Sculpture Park, St. Louis

North Carolina

- Time + Light Tower, 1991, Capital Blvd & Fairview Dr, Raleigh

Ohio

- Light Path Crossing, 1987, Case Western University, Cleveland
- Sun Obelisk, 1974, Promenade Park, Toledo

Oklahoma

- Tulsa Time and Light Continuum, 1983, Convention Center, Tulsa
- Radiant Range, 1993, Convention Center, Tulsa
- Kansas Landmark (Drum Piece), 1965, Philbrook Museum of Art, Tulsa

Oregon

- Levitated Light, 1987, Portland State University, School of Business Administration, Portland

Tennessee

- Airport Sun Project, 1989, Nashville International Airport, Nashville

Utah

- Light and Time Incident, 1995, Utah State University, Science / Technology Library, Logan

Virginia

- Light Garden, 1988, Virginia Beach

Wisconsin

- Appleton Aurora, 1989, Appleton Center, Appleton

=== International ===
- City Art Museum, Helsinki (Finland)
- Cankaya Cultural and Arts Foundation, Ankara, Turkey

== Awards and honors ==
He received numerous awards and honors, including a Guggenheim Fellowship and grants from the Ford Foundation, the American Institute of Architects and the National Endowment of the Arts.

== Publications ==
Ralph Coe. Dale Eldred: Sculpture Into Environment, ISBN 0-7006-0159-7, Regents Press Kansas, 1978.
