= The Frances Young Tang Teaching Museum and Art Gallery =

Frances Young Tang Teaching Museum and Art Gallery
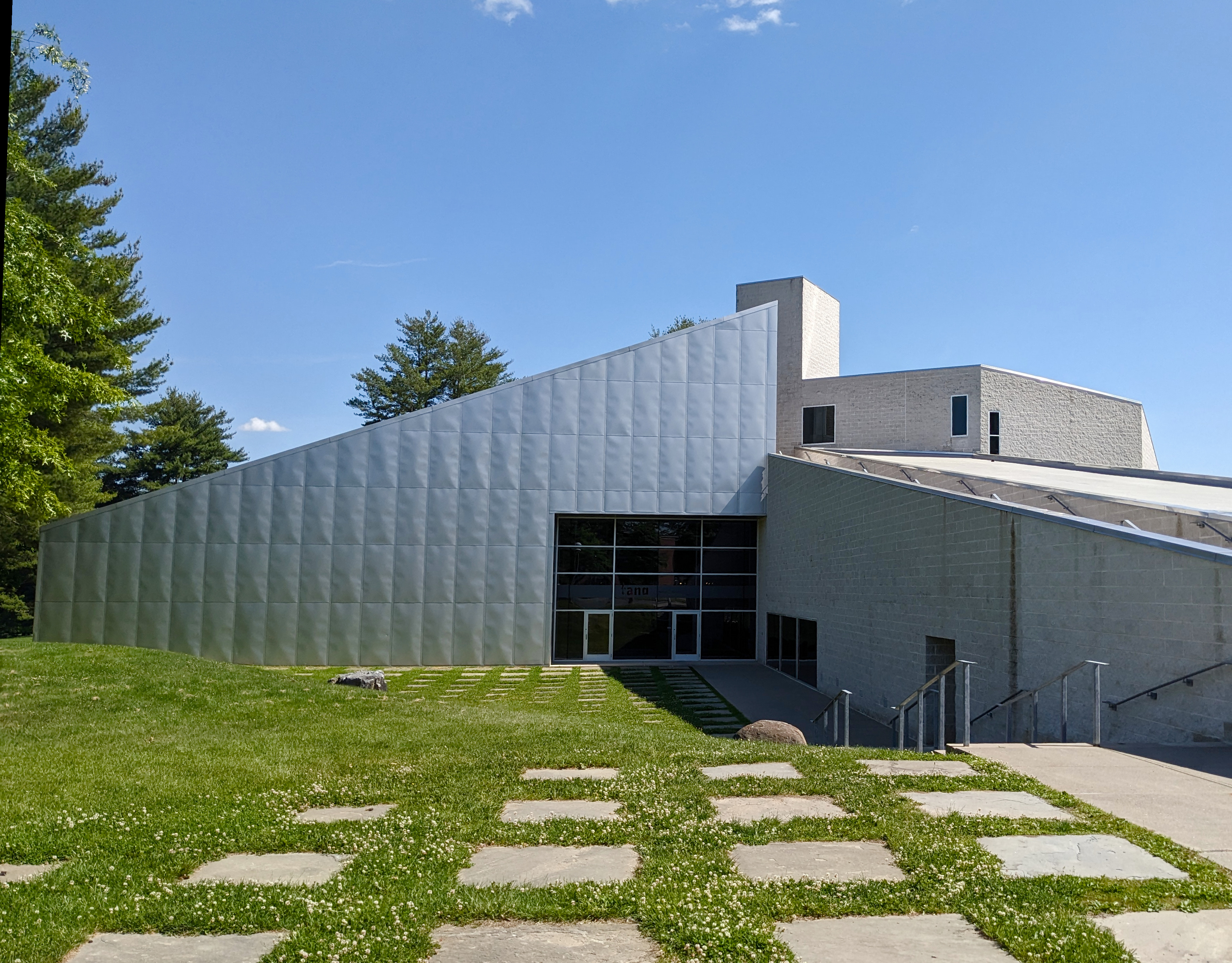
- Tang Teaching Museum entrance (2024)

- Location of Frances Young Tang Teaching Museum and Art Gallery in New York State The Frances Young Tang Teaching Museum and Art Gallery (the United States)
- Established: 2000
- Location: 815 N Broadway; Saratoga Springs, New York
- Coordinates: 43.095°N 73.7861°W
- Type: Art museum
- Accreditation: Association of Academic Museums and Galleries (AAMG)
- Owner: Skidmore College
- Website: https://tang.skidmore.edu

The Frances Young Tang Teaching Museum and Art Gallery is a part of Skidmore College and located in Saratoga Springs, New York.

== Building ==
The Tang, opened in 2000, was designed by architect Antoine Predock. Predock's design includes two major gallery wings (the Wachenheim Gallery and the Malloy Wing), two smaller galleries (the State Farm Mezzanine and the Winter Gallery), digitally equipped classrooms, and several event spaces. The Tang is nationally known for both its architecture and holdings, and its excellence has been recognized by The New York Times, Art in America, and Architectural Digest, among other publications.

== Permanent collection ==
The Tang has a collection of over 5,000 works, including pieces by Rembrandt van Rijn, Albrecht Dürer, Francisco de Goya, William Hogarth, Roy Lichtenstein, Wilhelmina Weber Furlong, Andy Warhol, Garry Winogrand, W. Eugene Smith, Eugène Atget, Dorothy Dehner, David Smith, Nayland Blake, and Nan Goldin. The museum also maintains extensive collections of art from Africa, South Asia, China, and the Americas.

== Notable exhibitions ==
The Tang has a program of contemporary scholarly exhibitions. Artists who have shown at the Tang include Kara Walker, Kiki Smith, Kate Ericson and Mel Ziegler, Trisha Brown, and Richard Pettibone. Among other recent exhibitions are "Brushing the Present: Contemporary Academy Painting from China", "From Pop to Now: Selections from the Sonnabend Collection", "The World According to the Newest and Most Exact Observations: Mapping Art and Science", "Work: Shaker Design and Recent Art", and "Molecules that Matter".

== Student involvement ==
As was the desire of the founding director Charles Stainback, the Tang is committed to being an educational center above all else. Skidmore classes regularly meet in the galleries and classrooms, and groups from other schools visit to view exhibits and participate in activities. Tours, demonstrations, and other events are generally open to the general public. In addition to visual arts exhibitions, the Tang often hosts plays, musical performances, and dance recitals. As a "teaching museum", the Tang offers students the opportunity to have hands-on experiences with the museum's collection by curating an exhibition.

== Publications ==
In addition to a periodic newsletter for members and supporters, the Tang publishes its own Opener series of small hardcover catalogs for many of its temporary exhibitions. The Tang also co-publishes exhibition catalogs with other museums and galleries. A selection of its publications is available for browsing in a small reading area at the museum.

== See also ==
- List of university art museums and galleries in New York State
