= Tongva (disambiguation) =

The Tongva are a Native American people of California, USA.

Tongva may also refer to:

- Tongva language
- Tongva Park, in Santa Monica, California
