= Utah Museum of Contemporary Art =

Art museum in Salt Lake City US, opened 1931

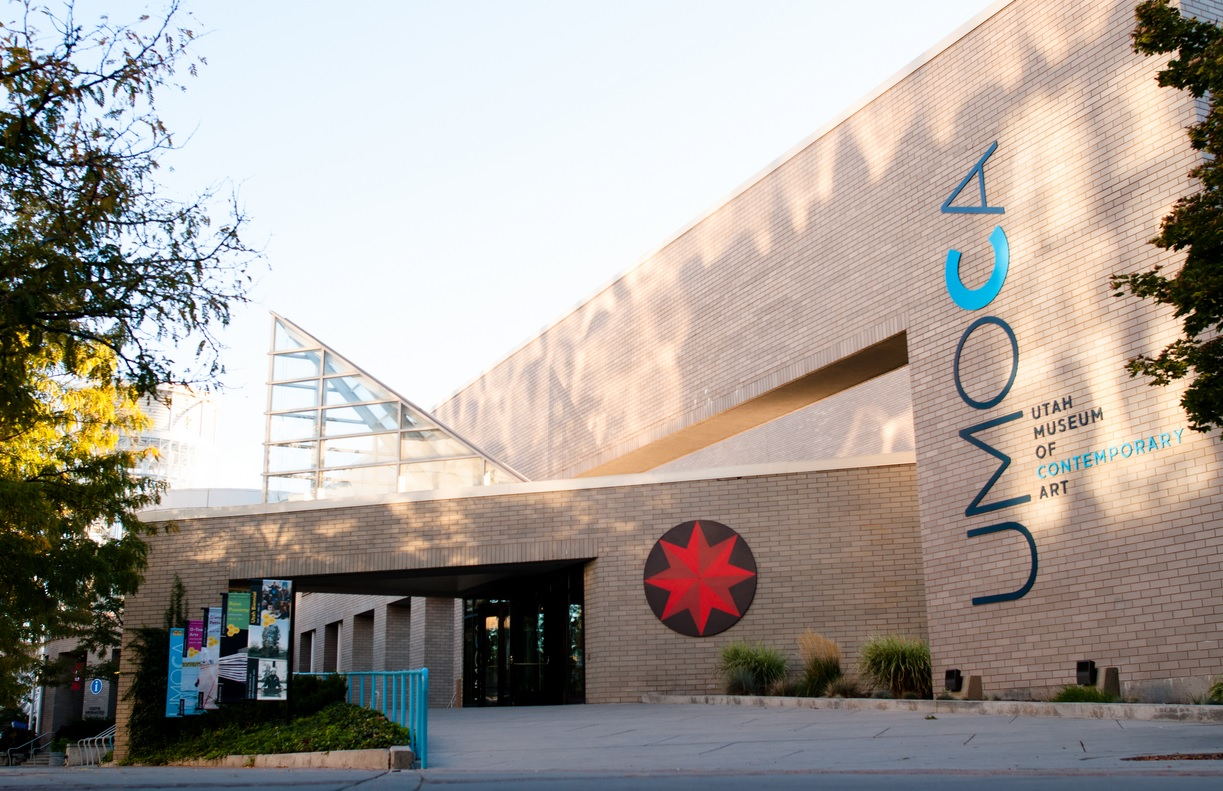
- Former name: Salt Lake Art Center
- Established: 1931
- Location: 20 S. West Temple, Salt Lake City, Utah 84101
- Coordinates: 40.769294°N 111.894929°W
- Type: Art museum
- Director: Laura Allred Hurtado
- Architect: FFKR Architects
- Website: www.utahmoca.org

The Utah Museum of Contemporary Art (UMOCA), formerly known as the Salt Lake Art Center, is a contemporary art museum located in downtown Salt Lake City. The museum presents rotating exhibitions by local, national, and international contemporary artists throughout its six gallery spaces.

== History ==
The Utah Museum of Contemporary Art was first founded in 1931 as the Art Barn Association by art enthusiast Alta Rawlins Jensen (1884–1980). She dreamed that the Art Barn would "be a retreat where art may be sold, expressed and fostered — a project which Salt Lake has long desired and never quite succeeded in obtaining." In the 1930s, the Art Barn focused its activities on supporting established and emerging Utah artists. Other endeavors included the creation of the Art Bulletin, an art journal featuring events and art reviews. It was first established as a non-profit organization in 1939. By the early 1940s, the Art Barn gained credibility as an art institution, exhibiting nationally and internationally renowned artists, including a series of oil paintings by Vincent van Gogh.

In 1958, the organization changed the name to the Salt Lake Art Center (SLAC) to better reflect its expanding role in the community, and two years later, the institution hired its first paid full-time director.

Edward Joe Ruben and the architectural firm of Fowler Ferguson Kingston Ruben Architects (FFKR) were chosen to design and build a new museum facility in the heart of downtown Salt Lake City which was completed in 1978. In 1979, SLAC moved to its new facility with increased and more adequate gallery space. In 1981, Salt Lake City residents and members of the National Endowment for the Arts commissioned Abstract artist Ilya Bolotowsky to create an outdoor sculpture for the center. The 24-foot stainless steel column, titled Column 24, stands between the museum and Abravanel Hall.

In 2011, SLAC changed its name to the Utah Museum of Contemporary Art (UMOCA) to reflect the organization's focus on contemporary art. UMOCA expanded its exhibition and community programming, and has been a four-time recipient of funding from the Andy Warhol Foundation as well as a 2015 recipient of the National Endowment for the Arts Art Works grant award.

Since 2011, UMOCA has partnered with the Jarvis and Constance Doctorow Family Foundation to present the biennial Catherine Doctorow Prize for Contemporary Painting to an emerging or mid-career artist who shows a great range of talent and forward-thinking within a contemporary idiom. Past winners have included Firelei Báez (2015), Tala Madani (2013) and Kim Schoenstadt (2011).

== Facilities ==
UMOCA houses two floors and six distinct galleries. In addition, the museum has multiple spaces for events and rentals, including a lobby, courtyard, 155-seat auditorium and meeting rooms. UMOCA also features an education studio, artist-in-residence studios and an art shop, which sells a variety of works by local artists.

The Salt Lake Art Center Photo School is located inside of the museum and offers courses for all skill levels in photography and digital imaging, as well as a photography darkroom and lab for student and public use.

=== Galleries ===
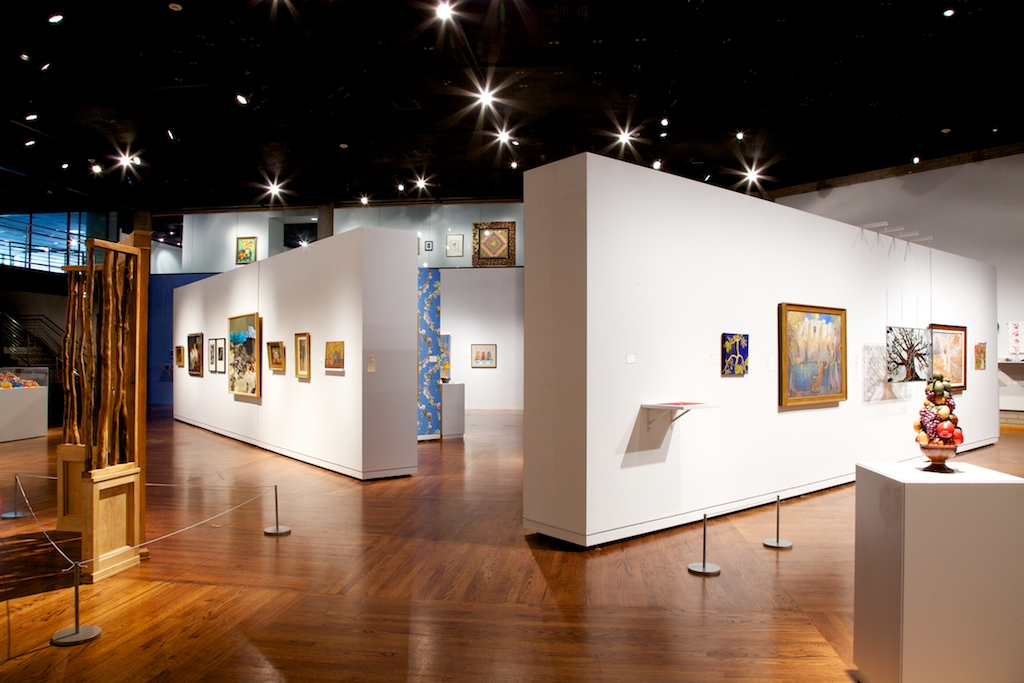
View of UMOCA's Main Gallery from the 2011 exhibition, Fallen Fruit of Utah.

- Main Gallery: The largest of UMOCA's gallery spaces, the Main Gallery is located on UMOCA's lower level and houses two major group or solo exhibitions throughout each year.
- Street Gallery: The Street Gallery is the second largest of UMOCA's galleries and exhibits both solo and group shows, including a solo exhibition of the winner of the biennial Catherine Doctorow Prize for Contemporary Painting. Exhibitions rotate every 2–4 months.
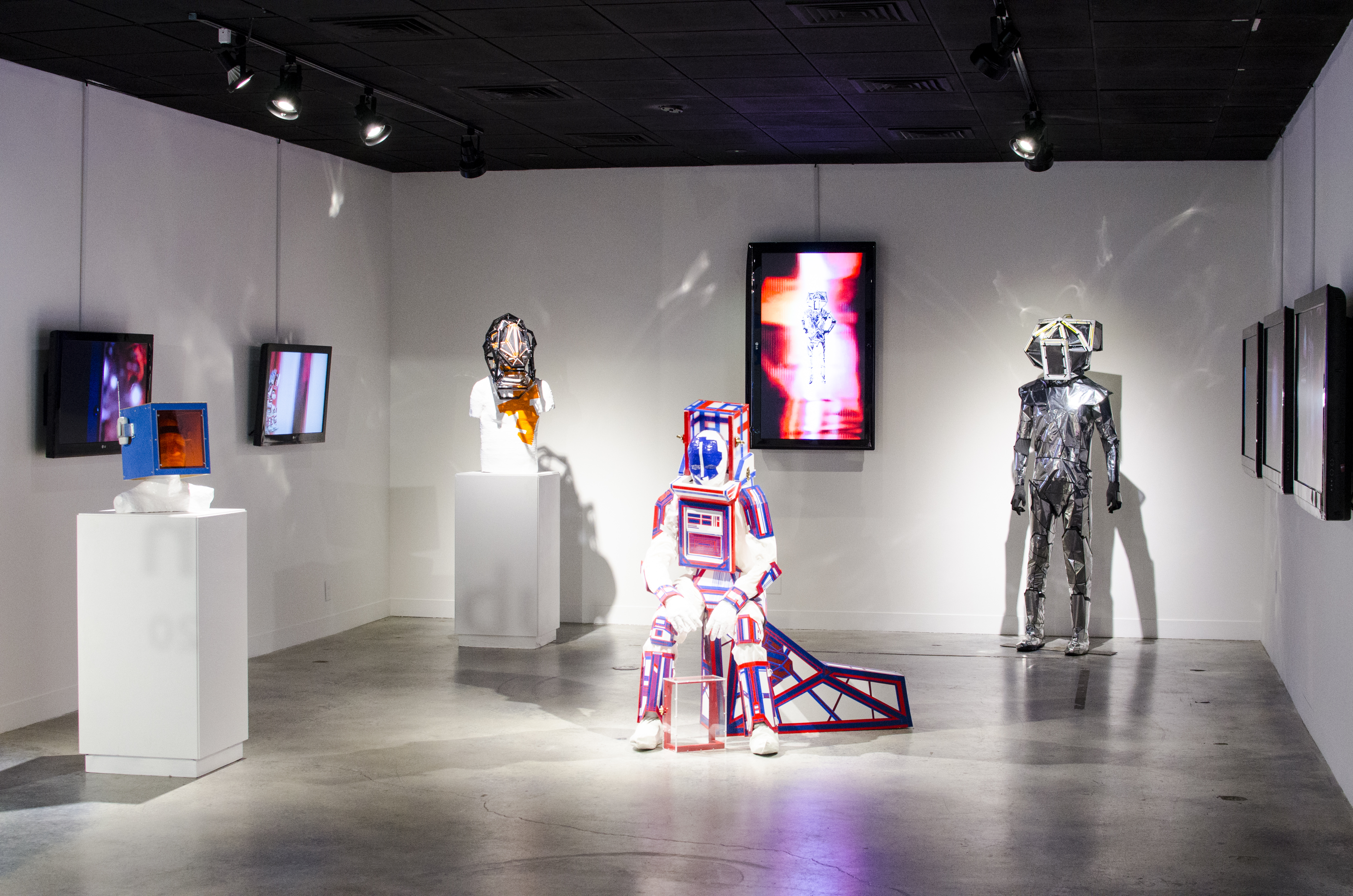
  View of UMOCA's Projects Gallery during Christopher Kelly's 2014 exhibition, God Complex.
- Codec Gallery: The Codec Gallery presents a series of solo exhibitions that usually are thematically in tandem with the current Main Gallery exhibition. Shows rotate every 2–3 months.
- Projects Gallery: Situated at the front of the museum, the Projects Gallery showcases artists working in Utah, who are invited to propose exhibitions for the Projects Gallery, which may range from site-specific installations to artist-curated shows. Proposals are reviewed on a rolling basis, and shows rotate every 1–2 months.
- A-I-R Space: The A-I-R Space, located on the lower level of the museum, is a dedicated gallery for participants of UMOCA's long-term Artists-in-Residence Program. At the end of their residency, each artist is given the opportunity to showcase the culmination of their work in a museum setting. Shows rotate each month.
- Ed. Space: The Ed. Space is UMOCA's newest gallery, located near the Education Studio. Each exhibition is presented in conversation with the museum's youth and family education programs, which include tours, workshops and art projects.

== Programs ==
UMOCA offers a variety of educational and outreach programs, including tours, art activities, films, art talks, community events, and workshops.

=== Education ===
Youth programs include the UMOCA Art Truck, a traveling educational art exhibition that brings art to schools and public venues throughout Utah; free hands-on art projects on the second Saturday of each month; summer camps and workshops; and tailored tours for families with young children or sensory-sensitive children.

Additional educational programs include the Artists-in-Residence Program a long-term residency program designed to meet the needs of artists living and working in Utah.

=== Community Outreach ===
The museum frequently offers community-wide programming such as art talks and exhibition walk-throughs, film and lecture series, and workshops with visiting artists and curators. UMOCA also maintains several community partnerships, resulting in collaborations with fellow arts nonprofits, community gardens and more.

=== Out Loud ===
Since 2015, UMOCA has created an artistic platform for young LGBTQ+ high school students in Utah. Through a multi-week workshop series, these teenage queer artists were given the opportunity to explore new mediums and develop their artistic voices with the support from local queer artists and Museum mentors. Their capstone project, is a culmination of their queer experiences, expertise, and workshops, and is exhibited in the Museum, typically from late April to early June.

== Exhibitions ==
The Utah Museum of Contemporary Art is a non-collecting institution. Exhibitions include both solo and group shows and generally change on a two- to six-month basis. Notable exhibitions since 2011 include:

- Kate Ericson & Mel Ziegler, and Mel Ziegler's Grandma's Cupboard (Aug. 28 - Dec. 19, 2015) presented parallel surveys of important projects from Ericson and Ziegler's conceptual art projects of the late 20th century, along with a selection of works from Ziegler's solo career.
- Bikuben (Jun. 27 - Dec. 20, 2014) was a group show exploring Danish contemporary art as a framework for understanding how the present may inform the past, as well as a way to highlight the fascinating ties between Denmark and Utah in terms of ideas regarding progress, industry, and utopia.
- Analogital (Jan. 18 - Apr. 20, 2013) was an exhibition of international artists who engage with concepts generated from the transitional space between analogue and digital.
- Battleground States (Oct. 5, 2012 – Jan. 5, 2013) brought together artists who critically engage with the discourse of visual culture and gender studies. Through video, sculpture, installation, and photography, each work explored ideas of how figuration and identity are connected.
- Your Land/My Land: Election '12 by Jonathan Horowitz was a special exhibition coinciding with the 2012 American presidential election. UMOCA joined the Hammer Museum in Los Angeles, the New Museum in New York City, and other museums across the United States in presenting the installation.
