= We Are All Homeless =

1993 visual arts project by Willie Baronet to raise awareness for homelessness

We Are All Homeless is a visual arts project created by Willie Baronet in 1993. Baronet, who works as a professor of advertising at Southern Methodist University, has collected over 2,200 signs from homeless people across the world which he displays through the project in a variety of exhibitions across the United States and United Kingdom. Since 2009, over 90 We Are All Homeless exhibits have been installed at NYU, The University of Pennsylvania, Cambridge University, the Anchorage Museum, the Utah Museum of Contemporary Art, and other universities, museums, and galleries. The exhibits, which display a number of the signs that Baronet has collected, are meant to challenge viewers and make them confront issues that they often ignore and raise awareness about homelessness.

== History ==
Baronet began to buy signs in 1993, when he was working in the advertising sector, and originally offered people between $4 and $40 for their signs. and as of May, 2014 estimated that he had spent over $7,000 on signs. He quickly amassed a collection of signs through this but didn't begin to display them until 2009.

In 2012 Baronet delivered a Tedx talk at SMU about We Are All Homeless.

In 2016 We Are All Homeless was exhibited in Philadelphia and Cleveland for the Democratic National Convention and the Republican National Convention respectively.

Baronet houses his collection in a number of places including his office at SMU and his studio in Oak Cliff.

== Signs of Humanity ==
Signs of Humanity is a documentary film produced and co-directed by Baronet and Tim Chumley which "explores the inter-related themes of home, homelessness, compassion and humanity". The film depicts the filmmakers' month-long voyage across America, travelling to 24 cities, purchasing signs. The documentary is rated 7.8/10 on IMDb. For Signs of Humanity, Baronet partnered with the Housing Crisis Center in Dallas.

Signs of Humanity builds upon Baronet’s long-running We Are All Homeless art project. The 2014 cross-country trip to collect signs and stories from people experiencing homelessness, reflecting on issues of empathy, privilege, and human connection. Produced by Shelly Spriggs, the documentary premiered at film festivals and was later screened in museums, universities, and community centers. The film received positive attention for its humanizing portrayal of homelessness through art and personal storytelling.

== Home is a Journey ==
Every year, Baronet organizes an event called Home is a Journey in which students at SMU make care packages for the homeless called "blessing bags" and march across campus carrying signs. In 2023, this event was coupled with a symposium which focused on the intersection of social justice and the homelessness, the role of higher education in fostering equity, and the role of non-profits in combatting homelessness. The annual march serves as both a reflection and a public awareness initiative, with students and community members walking in single file across campus while displaying original signs created by people who have experienced homelessness. The event aims to foster public reflection, conversation, and action around issues of dignity, belonging, and housing insecurity.

== Related research ==
The We Are All Homeless project has also inspired academic research examining public perception and engagement with homelessness. In 2023, Baronet and researchers from Thomas Jefferson University’s Public Health Department collaborated on a study titled “Even a smile helps: Exploring the interactions between people experiencing homelessness and passersby in public spaces,” published in the International Journal of Social Psychiatry. The paper builds on themes present in the We Are All Homeless project and investigates how brief, compassionate interactions such as eye contact or a smile can affect the well-being and dignity of individuals experiencing homelessness.
