= Chez Jay =

Historic restaurant in Santa Monica, California

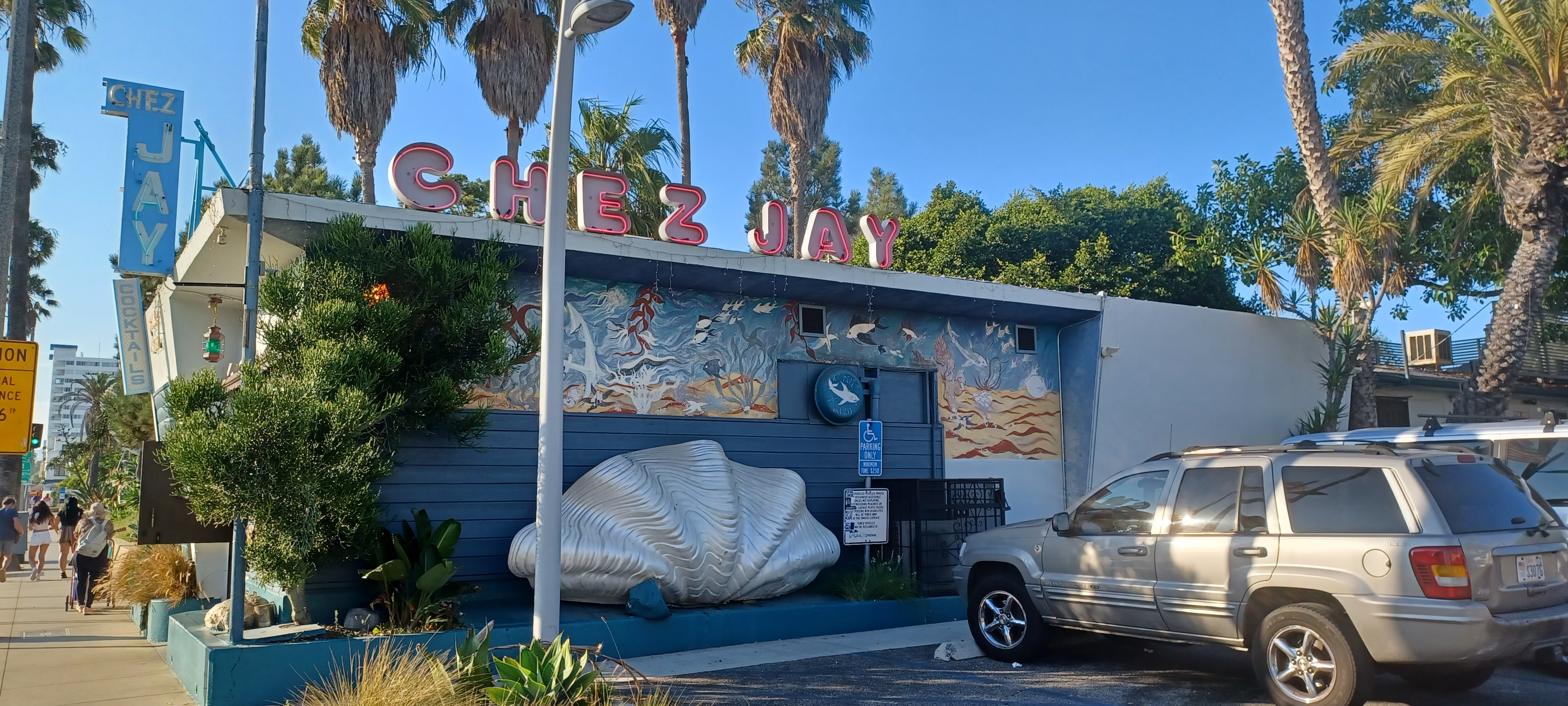
- Interactive map of Chez Jay

Restaurant information
- Established: 1959
- Previous owner: Jay Fiondella
- Location: 1657 Ocean Ave., Santa Monica, California, 90401
- Coordinates: 34°00′37″N 118°29′36″W
- Other information

Santa Monica Historic Landmark
- Designated: October 10, 2012
- Website: chezjays.com

Chez Jay is a restaurant located in Santa Monica, California that was built in 1947. It is notable for its long history of being patronized by Hollywood celebrities and has been featured in several productions including the Amazon series Goliath.

== History ==
Chez Jay is one of the oldest restaurants in Santa Monica, originally constructed in 1947 as a six-unit apartment building with a restaurant space on the ground floor by architect John S. Butler for owner Tom Kabbash. The bar had a nautical motif with portholes from a gambling ship seized in Santa Monica Bay and was called the Dawn Cafe.

In 1959, actor, hot air balloonist, and adventurer Jay Fiondella purchased the struggling Dawn Cafe for just one dollar from its previous owner and renamed it Chez Jay after the supper club "Chez Joey" in the Frank Sinatra film Pal Joey. Fiondella hosted an extravagant grand opening featuring showgirls and a circus elephant. The elephant dented the bar counter while snacking on the restaurant's free peanuts.

The venue hosted weekly jazz sessions featuring musicians like Chet Baker and Slim Gaillard, attracting a mix of Hollywood insiders and stars. By the mid-1960s, the restaurant had a devoted following, starting with British actors like Richard Burton and Peter Sellers, before becoming a staple for Rat Pack members Frank Sinatra, Dean Martin, and Sammy Davis Jr.

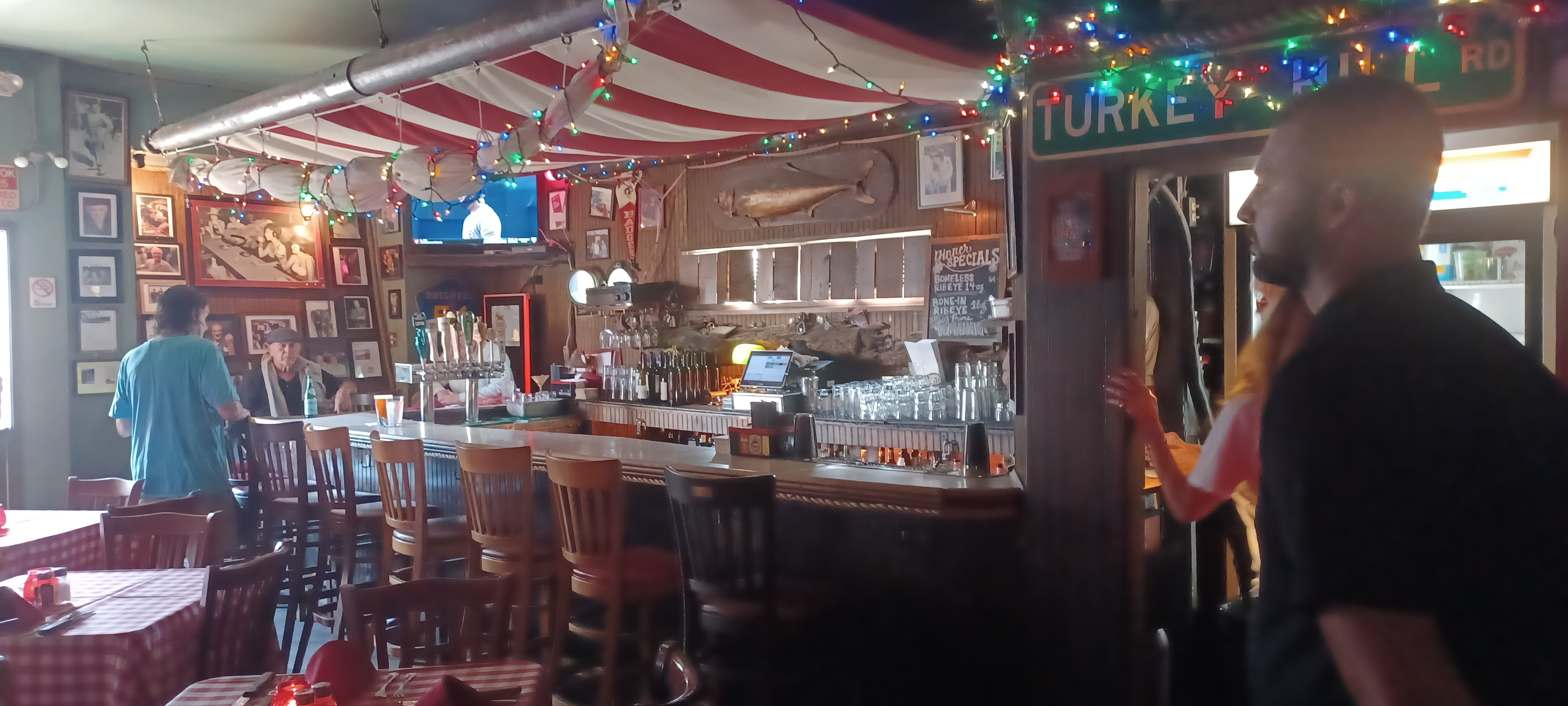
Bar at Chez Jay

Key legends from this era include rumored secret rendezvous between Marilyn Monroe and President John F. Kennedy, actor Lee Marvin allegedly riding his motorcycle through the front door to order a drink, and Warren Beatty entertaining dates at the secluded Table 10—a curtained booth also said to be where Daniel Ellsberg passed the Pentagon Papers to a New York Times reporter.

In 1971, astronaut Alan Shepard smuggled a Chez Jay peanut to the moon during the Apollo 14 mission and returned it where it was dubbed the "Astro-Nut"; it was nearly swallowed by Steve McQueen but is now stored in the restaurant's safe.

Jay Fiondella died in 2008, and the restaurant was carried on by his family and partners.

In the early 2010s the City of Santa Monica planned to develop the adjacent Tongva Park, potentially demolishing Chez Jay. Public outcry, including a Landmarks Commission meeting in October 2012 with endorsements from actors like Renée Zellweger and Kiefer Sutherland, led to its designation as a Santa Monica Historic Landmark, preserving the site.

The restaurant also serves as a creative hub, with screenplays like parts of Beatty's Shampoo reportedly born there, and it appeared in films and TV shows, including a recurring role in the Amazon series Goliath.
