= Cake Picnic =

Touring cake-sharing event

Cake Picnic is a cake-sharing event founded in 2024 by Elisa Sunga and Danny Knight in San Francisco. Each person who attends must bring a whole cake to share, hence the event's rule, "no cake, no entry". The event has since been held in other cities in the United States and abroad, including New York City, Los Angeles, London, and Melbourne.

== History ==
Cake Picnic was created by Elisa Sunga, a home baker who began baking during the COVID-19 pandemic. The first event was held in April 2024 at Potrero del Sol Park in San Francisco's Mission District. Organizers said about 180 to 200 people attended and brought a cake of their own.

A November 2024 edition at the Legion of Honor museum featured more than 600 cakes. The event returned to the museum in March 2025, this time alongside a Wayne Thiebaud exhibition; organizers reported 1,387 cakes.

A Los Angeles edition took place at Tongva Park in Santa Monica in September 2025, where organizers reported 483 cakes. An October 2025 event on Treasure Island drew 2,068 cakes, which organizers called its largest turnout so far. In March 2026 the first Australian edition was held in Melbourne, with around 1,600 cakes.

== Format ==
Each guest brings one whole cake, homemade or bought from a bakery.

== Cookbook ==
Elisa Sunga is the author of a companion cookbook, Cake Picnic: Recipes for the Love of Cake & Friends, published by Chronicle Books in May 2026. It collects 50 baking recipes together with a guide to hosting a cake picnic.
