= Column 24 =

Sculpture in Salt Lake City, Utah, U.S.

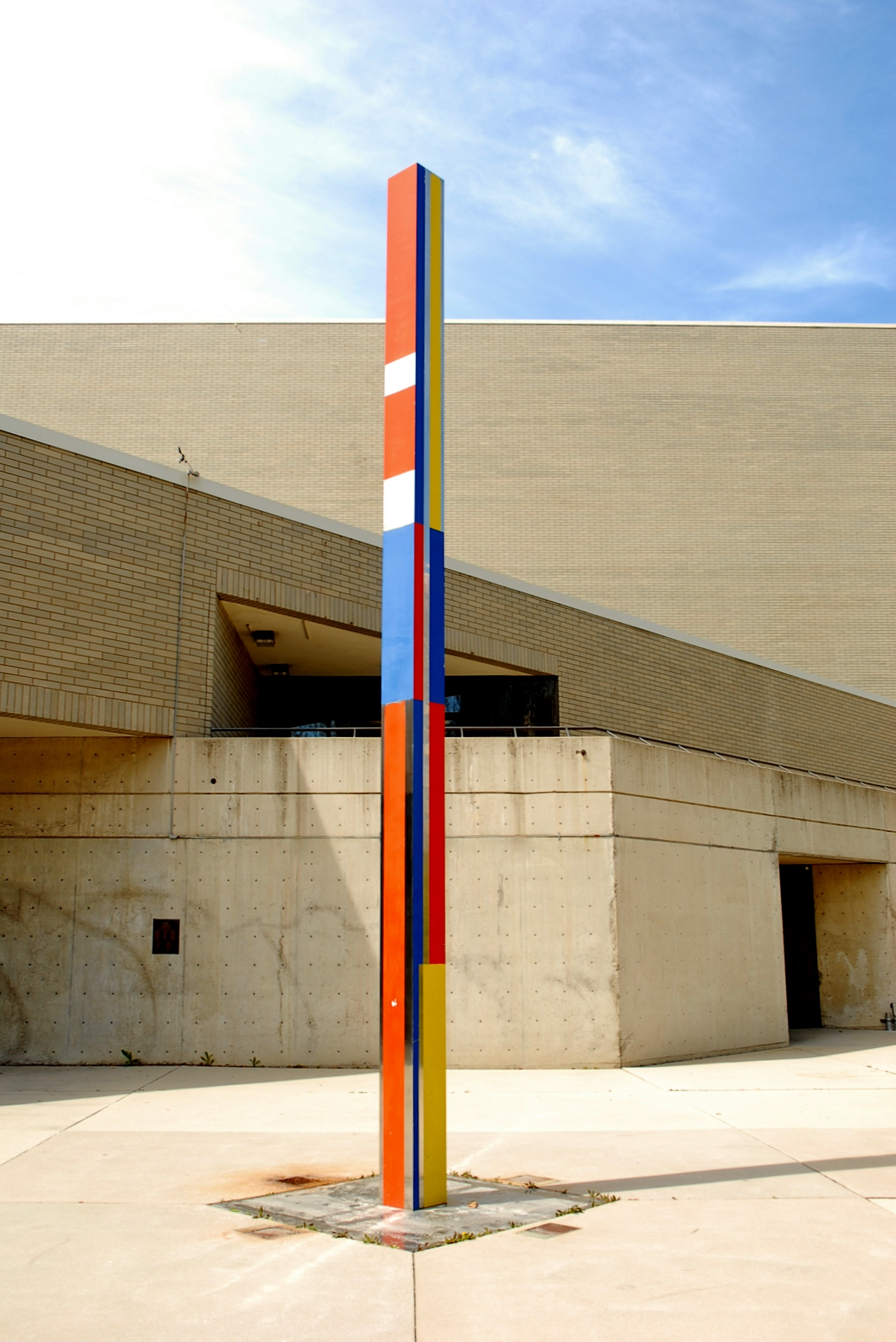
- Artist: Ilya Bolotowsky
- Location: Salt Lake City, Utah, U.S.
- 40°46′6.7″N 111°53′40.6″W

Column 24 (sometimes Column Twenty Four) is a 1981 sculpture by Ilya Bolotowsky, installed outside Salt Lake City's Utah Museum of Contemporary Art, in the U.S. state of Utah. The work was surveyed by the Smithsonian Institution's "Save Outdoor Sculpture!" program in 1993.
