= Max Protetch =

American art dealer

Max Protetch (born 1946) is an American dealer of contemporary art and architecture and founder of Max Protetch Gallery, New York City.

== Galleries ==
In 1969, at the age of 23, Protetch opened his first gallery in Washington, D.C., while a graduate student in political science at Georgetown University.

In 1978, Protetch moved his gallery to New York and began showing architectural drawings. Since that time, Protetch has shown many of architecture's contemporary masters, including Aldo Rossi, Robert Venturi, John Hejduk, Michael Graves, Peter Eisenmann, Rem Koolhaas, Zaha Hadid, Frank Gehry, Tadao Ando, Daniel Libeskind, and Samuel Mockbee. Protetch represented the estates of Frank Lloyd Wright and Erik Gunnar Asplund; has holdings of Louis Kahn, Buckminster Fuller, and Ludwig Mies van der Rohe; and has sold the entire estates of Luis Barragán and Aldo Rossi. Protetch also has shown and represented artists who are uniquely engaged with public sculpture, including the late Scott Burton, who has been the greatest artist-proponent of functional sculpture.

In 2010, the gallery was sold to new owners. In 2012 he began dealing art and architecture privately from New York and Santa Fe.

== Representation ==
During the Washington years, 1969 to 1978, Protetch represented Andy Warhol and other Pop artists; gave Vito Acconci his first one-person show; and was showing Conceptual artists such as Sol LeWitt, Joseph Kosuth, On Kawara, Robert Berry, and Doug Hubler as early as 1970. Kosuth and Art Language Press Group also had one-person shows during those years. Protetch presented early performance art by Dan Graham and Dennis Oppenheim. Donald Judd, Sol LeWitt, Dan Flavin, Joel Shapiro, Jo Baer, Lawrence Weiner, and Carl Andre exhibited. The Gallery mounted several political shows, including the group show 'Political Art' which featured Dorothea Rockburne, Daniel Buren, Sol LeWitt, Carl Andre, and Robert Morris. This show was unique in dealing with the Marxist and political/economic involvements of Minimal and Conceptual art.

Post-2000s, Protetch represented established and emerging artists, including David Reed, Betty Woodman, Siah Armajani, Byron Kim, Oliver Herring, Iñigo Manglano-Ovalle, Marjetica Potrč, Tobias Putrih, Mike Cloud, Hai Bo, Ren Jian, Tim Hyde, Chen Qiulin, Siebren Versteeg, Ann Pibal, Gao Shiqiang, Saul Chernick, Zach Harris, Sun Xun, Keita Sugiura, Katayoun Vaziri, Tun Win Aung & Wah Nu, the Estate of Richard DeVore, and the Estate of Scott Burton.

== Expositions ==
In the aftermath of September 11th, Protetch organized the landmark exhibition 'New World Trade Center: Design Proposals.' The show featured proposals for Lower Manhattan from an international group of 60 invited architects, including some of the most influential minds in contemporary architecture. Widely regarded as the most highly attended private gallery exhibition in New York's history, the show was published as a book (HarperCollins, 2002) and was chosen by the U.S. State Department to represent the United States at the 8th International Biennale of Architecture in Venice.

In 2003, Protetch expanded to the rapidly growing arts community of Beacon, N.Y., with Protetch: Sculpture Beacon, a five-acre site for the exhibition of new and existing works of outdoor sculpture. The grounds have featured works by Sol LeWitt, Buckminster Fuller, Scott Burton, Marcel Breuer, Mel Chin, and Tobias Putrih.

== Chinese art ==
Protetch played a pioneering role in introducing Chinese contemporary art to Western audiences beginning in the mid-90s and including a previous partnership with Beijing Commune. The artists include Fang Lijun, Zhang Xiaogang, Yue Minjun, and Zhang Huan, among others. Many of these artists had their first U.S. gallery exhibitions with Protetch.
