= Light + Time Tower =

Coordinates: 35.7984°N 78.6386°W

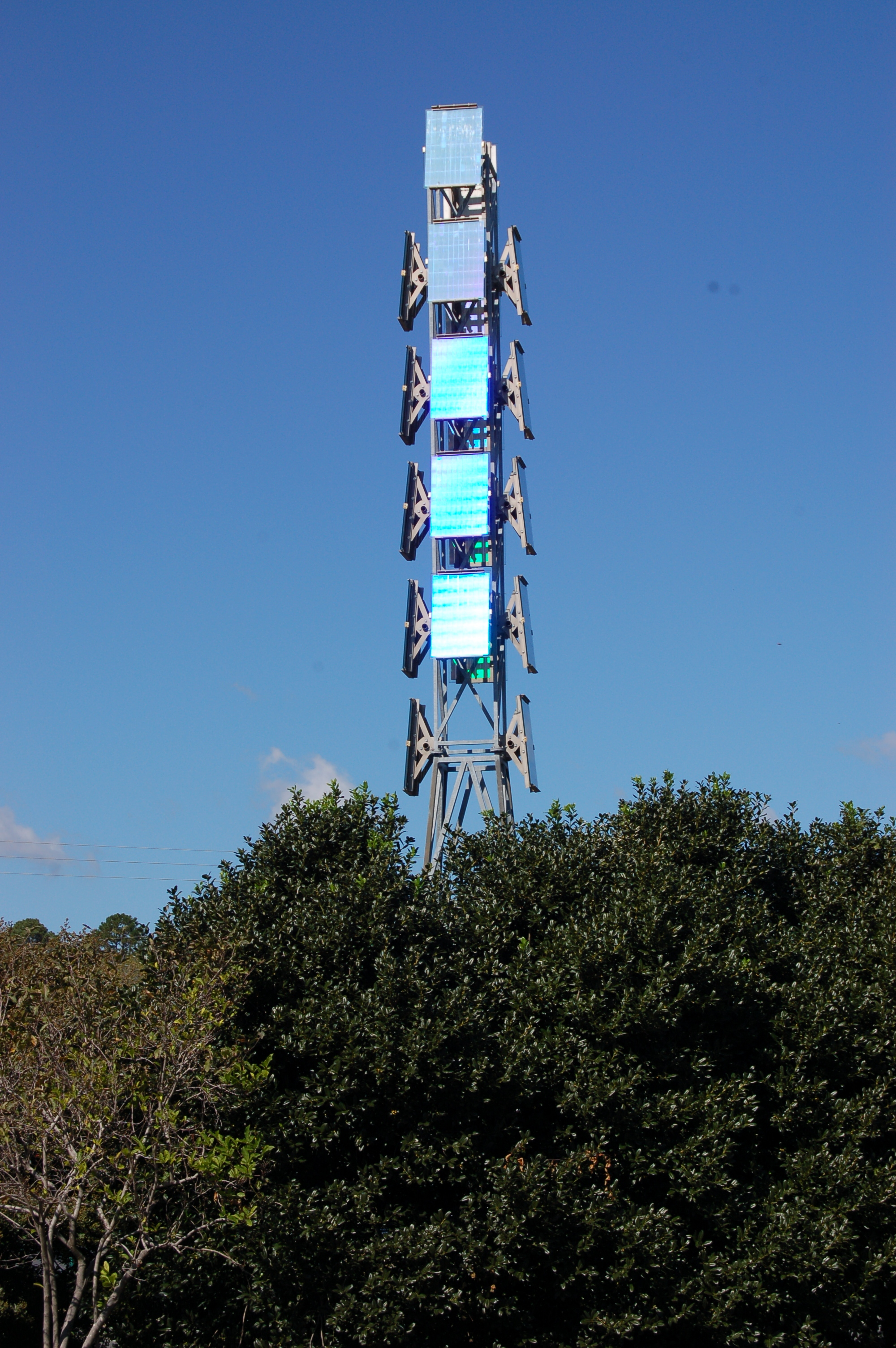
Light+Time

The Light + Time Tower is a sculpture located in the city of Raleigh, North Carolina designed to diffract the morning and afternoon sunlight into vibrant colors visible to the commuters who pass by it. It is located in the median of Capital Boulevard just northeast of the Fairview Road overpass.

The Light + Time Tower consists of a 40-foot (12 m) tower supporting 20 panels of clear glass. It was created by internationally known sculptor Dale Eldred and was commissioned by the Raleigh Arts Commission in 1995. The artist died suddenly before the work was complete, however his wife Roberta Lord finished the piece. Its $51,100 cost was criticized by then-mayoral candidate Tom Fetzer in that year's mayoral race.

== See also ==
- Community arts
- Public art
