= Ernesto Pujol =

Ernesto Pujol is a site-specific performance artist, social choreographer, and educator with an interdisciplinary practice. Pujol was born in 1957 in Havana, Cuba and spent time in San Juan, Puerto Rico, and in Madrid and Barcelona, Spain, before moving to the United States in 1979. He has lived and worked in New York since 1984. Pujol engaged in interdisciplinary pursuits, such as psychology and literature, while doing undergraduate work in humanities and visual arts at the University of Puerto Rico, in Spanish art history at the Universidad Complutense in Spain and in philosophy at St. John Vianney College Seminary in Florida. He pursued graduate work in education at the Universidad Interamericana in San Juan, Puerto Rico, in art therapy at Pratt Institute in Brooklyn, and in communications and media theory at Hunter College in New York City. Pujol received his MFA in interdisciplinary art practice from the School of the Art Institute of Chicago.

Pujol first became known during the 1990s for a series of site-specific installation projects that dealt with whiteness, masculinity, collective and individual memory, loss and mourning. His more recent performance work deals with subjects such as war, the environment, and consciousness, influenced by Zen Buddhism. Since 2000, Pujol has been exploring interiority in public and private spaces. He strives to reclaim public space from distractions through durational group performances in order to create space for silent reflection as critical to democracy. The artist seeks to awaken consciousness among viewers through the creation of such spaces. The writings of Carol Becker have served as a source of inspiration for Pujol with notions of citizenship, such as the artist as citizen and the citizenship of art within American democracy. He has also worked extensively with curator Mary Jane Jacob in Charleston and with curator Saralyn Reece Hardy at the Spencer Museum of Art in Lawrence and the Salina Arts Center in Kansas.

Desert Walk from the Inheriting Salt series, Honolulu Museum of Art

In 2008, Pujol did a series of performances titled Inheriting Salt and began making sculptures out the footprints he produced during the performances. Desert Walk, in the collection of the Honolulu Museum of Art, is such a sculpture. Two of his largest scale projects to date took place in Salt Lake City, Utah (Awaiting, 2009) and in Honolulu, Hawaii (Speaking in Silence, 2010). The artist has worked extensively with a variety of media, including installation, photography, and performance.

Ernesto Pujol represented the United States in 1997 at the Second Johannesburg Biennial in South Africa, the Sixth Havana Biennial in Cuba and the Second Saaremaa Biennial in Estonia. He has also received a number of fellowships from institutions such as the Pollock-Krasner Foundation, the Joan Mitchell Foundation, the Mid Atlantic Arts Foundation, Art Matters, and the New York Foundation for the Arts. Pujol has also been an active participant with a number of arts institutions serving with the Academy for Educational Development, the National Endowment for the Arts and the New York State Council on the Arts.
