= Christopher Sperandio =

American artist (born 1964)

Christopher Sperandio (born 1964) is an American artist known for his collaborative work with British artist Simon Grennan.

== Biography ==
Sperandio was born in Kingwood, West Virginia, and attended West Virginia University, receiving his Bachelor of Fine Arts in printmaking in 1987. He pursued graduate coursework at the University of Illinois at Chicago receiving a Master of Fine Arts in painting in 1991. Both Grennan and Sperandio were classmates of Tom Friedman. Sperandio is an assistant professor at Rice University in the School of Visual and Dramatic Arts.

== Artworks ==
The "We got it!" bar was the result of the artists collaboration with the unionized workforce of a suburban Chicago chocolate factory for Sculpture Chicago's Culture in Action exhibition.

Grennan and Sperandio were commissioned to make new work for the international contemporary art survey Traffic, curated by Nicolas Bourriaud, and their works have often been exhibited with other "Relational Art" practitioners, such as Rirkrit Tiravanija and Maurizio Cattelan.

Grennan and Sperandio have produced 18 comic books for museums with Fantagraphics Books, DC Comics and under their own imprint Kartoon Kings. Typical of these is the "Invisible City" project for the Public Art Fund and "Modern Masters" produced for PS1/MoMA. Kartoon Kings: The Graphic Work of Simon Grennan and Christopher Sperandio, a monograph collecting images and information on their collaborative practice was published in 2007.

Sperandio is credited as creator and executive producer of ARTSTAR, an eight-part unscripted television series set in the New York art world of Deitch Projects airing on American television (Voom) in 2006.
