= Daniel Joseph Martinez =

American artist, and Donald Bren Professor of Art, University of California, Irvine

Daniel Joseph Martinez (born 1957) is a Los Angeles–based visual artist and educator whose work explores individual and collective identity, as well as the tension between political activism and personal culpability, through a wide range of media that encompasses text, photography, painting, sculpture, video, performance, and even motorized animatronic self-portraits.

== Early life ==
Martinez grew up in Lennox, California, a working-class area of Los Angeles County near Los Angeles International Airport. After high school, he attended the California Institute of the Arts, where he received his BFA in 1979. During the 1980s, he worked as a freelance photographer, and spent time working with Harry Gamboa Jr. and ASCO.

== Collections ==
Martinez' work can be found in public collections in the United States and abroad including the Whitney Museum of American Art in New York; Los Angeles County Museum of Art (LACMA); the Orange County Museum of Art, Newport Beach, California; Cisneros Fontanals Art Foundation, Miami, Florida; Museum of Fine Arts, Houston, Texas; and the Pace Foundation, San Antonio, Texas.

== Honors ==
Daniel Joseph Martinez has received two National Endowment for the Arts (NEA) Individual Artist Fellowships (1990–91, 1995–96) and an NEA Project Support Grant (1990); a Getty Center Foundation Individual Artist Fellowship (1997–98); a Pollock-Krasner Foundation Individual Artist Fellowship (2001–02); a California Arts Council Individual Artist Fellowship (2003–04); an ArtPace Foundation Fellowship (2005); a Peter Norton Family Foundation Project Support Grant (1991) and five Norton Foundation Artist Fellowships (1997–2001); the First Prize Grant Award of the Tijuana Biennial (2000); and a Flintridge Foundation Individual Artist Fellowship (2000–01). In 2007 Martinez was awarded the United States Artists Fellowship, and in 2008–09, he received the Rasmuson Foundation Alaska Artist in Residence Award in 2009, the Fellows of Contemporary Art Fellowship in 2009; and the 2010 FOCA Fellowship Artist Grant and exhibition. In 2014 Martinez was awarded the Alpert Award in the Arts from the Herb Alpert Foundation in collaboration with the California Institute of the Arts. In 2016, Martinez participated in the American Academy in Berlin Fellowship, Berlin, Germany.
