= Mary Jane Jacob =

American curator

Mary Jane Jacob is an American curator, writer, and educator from Chicago, Illinois. She is a professor at the School of the Art Institute of Chicago, and is the former Executive Director of Exhibitions and Exhibition Studies. She has held posts as Chief Curator at the Museum of Contemporary Art, Los Angeles and at the Museum of Contemporary Art, Chicago.

Since 1990 Jacob has been a pioneer in the areas of public, site-specific, and socially engaged art. Jacob is the author and editor of many key texts including Conversations at the Castle: Changing Audiences and Contemporary Art (1996) and Culture in Action: New Public Art in Chicago (1993).

Jacob has mounted exhibitions, and created public art opportunities that have featured the work of some of the most influential artists in contemporary art including Mark Dion, Suzanne Lacy, Ernesto Pujol, J. Morgan Puett, Pablo Helguera, Marina Abramović, and Alfredo Jaar. The Women's Caucus for Art honored Jacob as a 2010 recipient of the organization's Lifetime Achievement Award.

Jacob received her M.A. in the History of Art and Museum Studies from the University of Michigan, Ann Arbor.

== Curatorial approach ==
Jacob has an approach to curation that focuses heavily on site, history, social context, and audience relationships. These approaches are most evident in her influential project Culture in Action: Public Art in Chicago.

== Exhibitions and projects ==
In 1991 and again in 2000–2008 Jacob was the curator of visual arts projects for Spoleto Festival USA in Charleston, South Carolina. This was the site of Places With a Past (1991) and Places With a Future (2005).

In 1996 Jacob was the curator of Conversations at the Castle: Changing Audiences and Contemporary Art as part of the Arts Festival of Atlanta for the 1996 Olympics.

In September 2014, she opened an exhibition, A Proximity of Consciousness: Art and Social Action, which also connected to the symposium, A Lived Practice, held at the School of the Art Institute of Chicago and was co-curated with Kate Zeller. Jacob and Zeller also co-edited the Chicago Social Practice History Series, a four-volume set distributed by the University of Chicago Press that came out of the show. In addition to editing the series, Jacob and Zeller also edited one of the volumes in the series, A Lived Practice, along with Terry Ann R. Neff.

== Books and publications ==
Jacob has written and edited over three dozen books and exhibition publications. Her most recent books include Dewey for Artists (University of Chicago Press, 2018), The Studio Reader: On the Space of Artists (University of Chicago Press, 2010), and Learning Mind: Experience into Art (University of California Press, 2010).

== Teaching ==
Jacob is a professor at the School of the Art Institute of Chicago in Sculpture where she is the former Executive Director of Exhibitions and Exhibition Studies.

== Museum affiliations ==
From 1976 to 1980, Jacob was the associate curator of modern art at the Detroit Art Institute. She served as the chief curator at the Museums of Contemporary Art in Chicago from 1980 to 1986. She served as the chief curator at the Museum of Contemporary Art Los Angeles from 1986 to 1989.
