= Tongva Park =

Park in Santa Monica, California, U.S.

Coordinates: 34°00′40″N 118°29′35″W

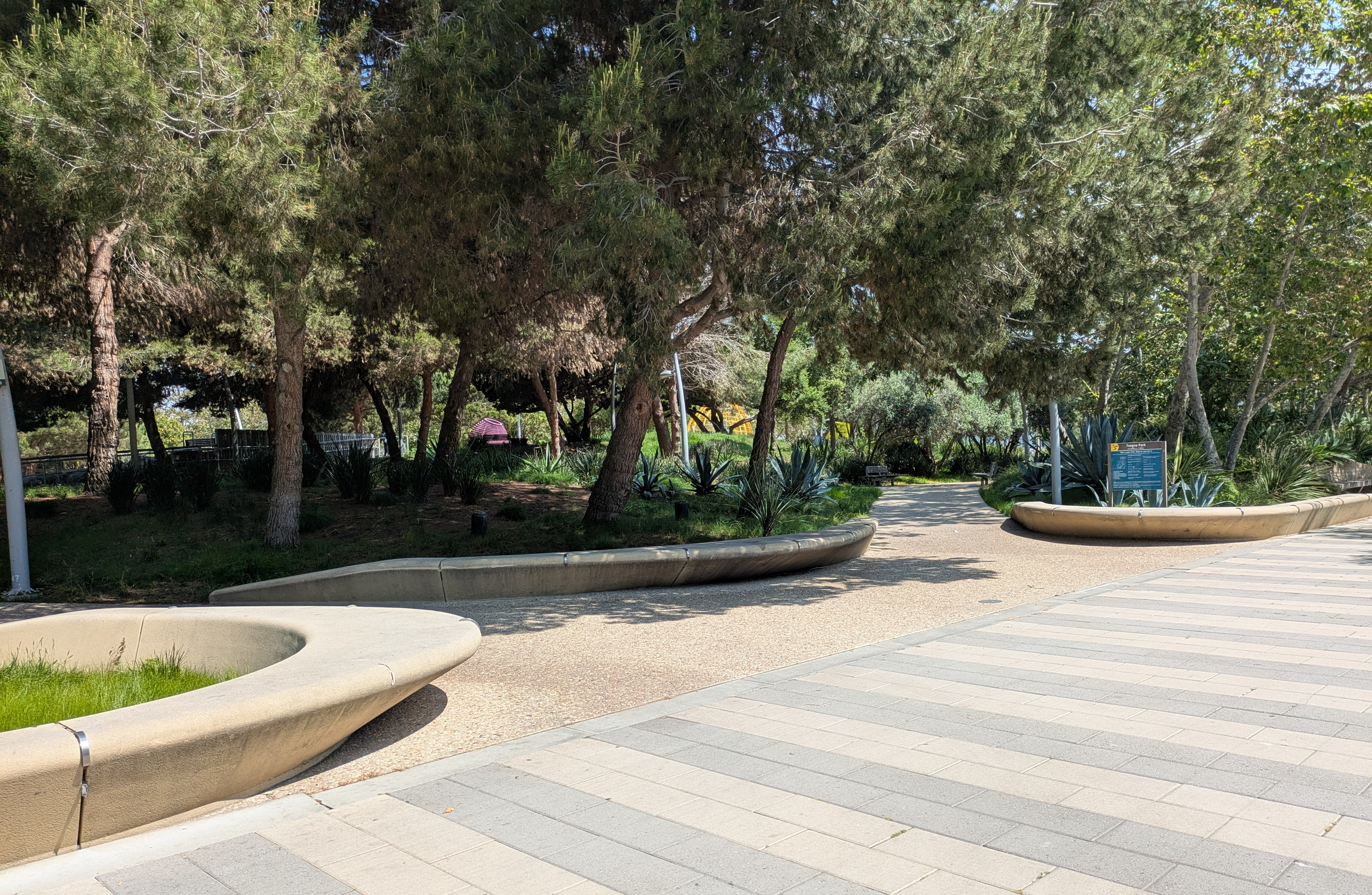
- Interactive map of Tongva Park
- Location: Santa Monica, California, U.S.

Tongva Park is a 6.2-acre (2.5 ha) park in Santa Monica, California. The park is named after the indigenous Tongva people, who have lived in the Los Angeles area for thousands of years. The park is located just south of Colorado Avenue, between Ocean Avenue and Main Street.

The park includes an amphitheater, playground, garden, fountains, picnic areas, and restrooms. An overlook offers scenic views of the Pacific Ocean and of the Santa Monica Pier.

Notable trees in the park include "Morty," a large Moreton Bay fig tree (Ficus macrophylla) and the "Three Amigos," three rusty fig (Ficus rubiginosa) trees each weighing over 100 tons. The "Three Amigos" were moved 550 ft from their prior location at the intersection of Main Street and Olympic Drive and replanted in the park.

A Santa Monica City Ordinance prohibits smoking in any City park.

The park was dedicated on October 13, 2013.
