= Mel Ziegler (artist) =

American artist (born 1956)

- Born: 1956 (age 69–70); Campbelltown, Pennsylvania, U.S.
- Education: Rhode Island School of Design, Kansas City Art Institute (BFA), California Institute of the Arts (MFA)
- Known for: Public art, social practice art, sculpture, community arts
- Awards: Loeb Fellowship at the Harvard Graduate School of Design, 1996-97; Pollock-Krasner Foundation Award, 2011 and 1995; Creative Capital Fellow, 1999; Joan Mitchell Foundation Award, 1998

Mel Ziegler (born 1956) is an American visual artist and educator, whose artistic practice includes community art, integrated arts, and public art. Ziegler lives in Nashville, Tennessee, where he is the chair of the department of art at Vanderbilt University.

== Early life and education ==
Mel Ziegler was born in 1956, in Campbelltown, Pennsylvania. Ziegler began his undergraduate studies at the Rhode Island School of Design (RISD) from 1974 to 1976, and later transferring to the Kansas City Art Institute where he received a BFA degree in 1978. He received an MFA in 1982 from the California Institute of the Arts in Valencia, California.

== Early career ==
Kate Ericson and Ziegler were influential collaborators in social interventionist art, beginning officially as a team in 1985 and continuing until Ericson died of brain cancer in 1995. In 1988 their work was exhibited at both the Museum of Modern Art in New York, and the Hirshorn in Washington D.C., and was the subject of a major retrospective accompanied by a significant publication, "America Starts Here" at the MIT List Center for the Visual Arts in 2006. The exhibition was organized by curators Bill Arning, then at MIT List Visual Arts Center, and Ian Berry, the Tang Teaching Museum and Art Gallery at Skidmore College, and toured to Austin Museum of Art, Texas, H&R Block Artspace at the Kansas City Art Institute, and Contemporary Art Center, Cincinnati.

Together, Ericson and Ziegler made site-specific installations and objects concerned with mapping trajectories, questioning history, and highlighting the specificity of places and communities. As a collaborative duo, Ericson / Ziegler's work was integral to the emergence of integrated practice and community engagement as vital forms of contemporary art. In the Wall Street Journal review of their 2014 exhibition at Perrotin Gallery in New York, Carol Kino writes: “Kate Ericson and Mel Ziegler were ardent pioneers of the art now known as "social practice."”

== Late career ==
Throughout his career, Ziegler’s practice has examined the role of art in public space, the socially-constructed dimensions of our natural environment, the value of manual labor, and the importance of collaboration between the artist and the broader community.

He is the chair of the department of art at Vanderbilt University, and this is where he was also the host of the 2014 National Arts Administrators' conference.

Ziegler has exhibited nationally and internationally and has presented solo exhibitions at venues including: Canadian Centre for Architecture, Montreal in 1998; Artpace, San Antonio, in 1999; Secession, Vienna in 2003; and Bemis Center for Contemporary Arts, Omaha, Nebraska in 2014.

Reviewing his 2014 exhibition “An American Conversation” at the Bemis Center for Contemporary Arts, Daniel Tidwell writes in Nashville Arts magazine: “[Ziegler] is part historian, conceptual artist, sociologist, and aspiring farmer—creating work that occupies a unique place in the art world, bridging political, historical, and social concerns—mining the buried histories and narratives of the American landscape.”

He has been the recipient of numerous awards and fellowships, including being a Loeb Fellow at the Harvard School of Design in 1997; having been recognized by the Joan Mitchell Foundation with a 1997 painters and sculptors' grant, and the 2013 Joan Mitchell Center AIR program; being a 2000 Creative Capital (Visual Arts) Fellow; and being the recipient of National Endowment for the Arts, Art Works grants in 1989 and 1993.

Ziegler has established the Sandhills Institute,“a catalyst for the creation of civically-engaged integrated art in and around the agricultural community” on the historic Davis Pine Creek Ranch near Rushville in north-west rural Nebraska, where he hosted a short form field trip residency for artists in June 2015. “International Art World Comes to Rushville, Nebraska” Sheridan County Journal Star, Thursday, 28 May 2015.

== Collections ==
His work is held in many public and private collections, including the Whitney Museum of American Art, New York, New York; Albright-Knox Museum, Buffalo, New York; Tang Museum, Skidmore College; Los Angeles County Museum of Art; Museum of Contemporary Art, Los Angeles; San Diego Museum of Art; San Francisco Museum of Modern Art; Rose Art Museum, Brandeis University; Des Moines Art Center, Iowa; Museum of Fine Arts, Houston, Texas.

== Publications ==
- Stuffed. Secession, 2003. By Ziegler. Text in English and German.
- America Starts Here. MIT, 2005. By Kate Ericson and Ziegler. Edited by Ian Berry and Bill Arning.

== Additional references ==
- Carol Kino, “New York's Galerie Perrotin Exhibits Artists Kate Ericson and Mel Ziegler's Work”, The Wall Street Journal, June 20, 2014
