= Kate Ericson =

Artist

Kate Witte Ericson
- Born: December 25, 1955; Manhattan, New York City
- Died: October 29, 1995 (aged 39); Milanville, Pennsylvania
- Education: BFA, Kansas City Art Institute, 1978; MFA, California Institute of the Arts, 1982
- Known for: Installation works of beauty, complexity and social awareness
- Style: Contemporary, conceptual
- Spouse: Mel Ziegler

Kate Witte Ericson (1955–1995) was an American artist whose work dealt with sociocultural issues, and it often manifested as public art.

== Life and education ==
The daughter of Herbert Arthur Ericson and Alma Elaine (née Witte) Ericson, she was born in Manhattan in 1955. She took coursework at the University of Colorado Boulder, 1973-75; and at Sir John Cass School of Art, Architecture and Design, London, in 1975.

Ericson received a B.F.A. in sculpture from the Kansas City Art Institute in 1978, and took classes at the University of Texas at Austin in 1979.

Ericson earned an M.F.A. in sculpture from the California Institute of the Arts in 1982. She and her husband Mel Ziegler studied under Michael Asher, Douglas Huebler, and John Baldessari.

Ericson died of brain cancer in 1995.

== Career ==
A frequent collaborator with her husband Mel Ziegler, Ericson's work examined issues related to natural and built environments, social policy, community, and labor. While many of her endeavors used outside public spaces or site-specific installation strategies in traditional gallery spaces, she also produced objects and drawings as well. She is said to use "a style that featured provocative accumulations of materials and ideas, many of them involved with architecture, American history and the economy." Her site-specific works often engaged communities by connecting them to issues and policies that impact them in ways that made visible challenges and conflicts, leading to more community agency.

Dennis Cooper of Artforum wrote, "What distinguishes Ericson and Ziegler's collaborative efforts—and, to a lesser extent, the pieces they’ve been making individually since 1980—is their unabashed continuation of deconstructive modes at a time when so many intellectually inclined artists are romancing viewers with imagery again."

== Selected exhibits ==
- 1991, "Camouflaged History", Spoleto Festival USA, Charleston, S.C. Ste-specific works dealing with Charleston’s history.
- 1988, "America Starts Here", Institute of Contemporary Art, University of Pennsylvania
- 1988, "The Conscious Stone", the Hirshhorn Museum and Sculpture Garden, Washington, D.C.
- 1987, "If Landscapes Were Sold", DiverseWorks, Houston
- 1986, "Stones Have Been Known to Move", White Columns, New York
- 1986, "House Monument", the Los Angeles Institute of Contemporary Art
- 1989, "Here and There: Travels IV: Mapping Travels"
