= Lane Bequest =

Collection of paintings

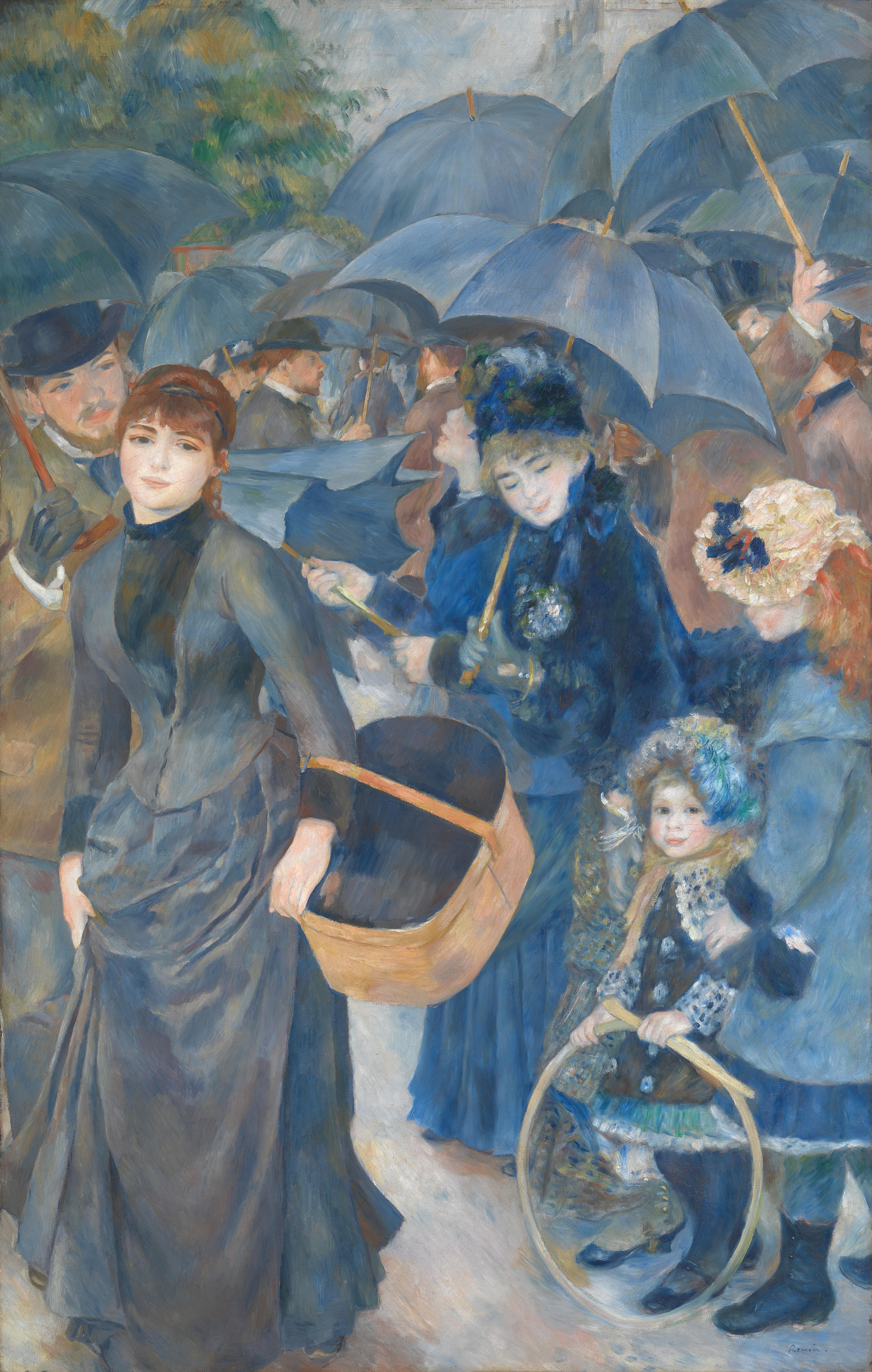
Pierre-Auguste Renoir, The Umbrellas, NG3268

The Lane Bequest is a collection of 39 paintings from the estate of Sir Hugh Lane. The collection is mainly paintings by French 19th-century artists, including several by the Impressionists, including masterpieces such as Manet's Music in the Tuileries (1862) and Renoir's The Umbrellas (c.1881), along with many more modest works. The collection is owned by the National Gallery, London, but most of the paintings are now displayed at the Hugh Lane Gallery in Dublin.

Since 1959 the two galleries have arranged rotations of works between them. In 2008 the whole bequest was exhibited together in Dublin for the first time in several decades.

== Background ==
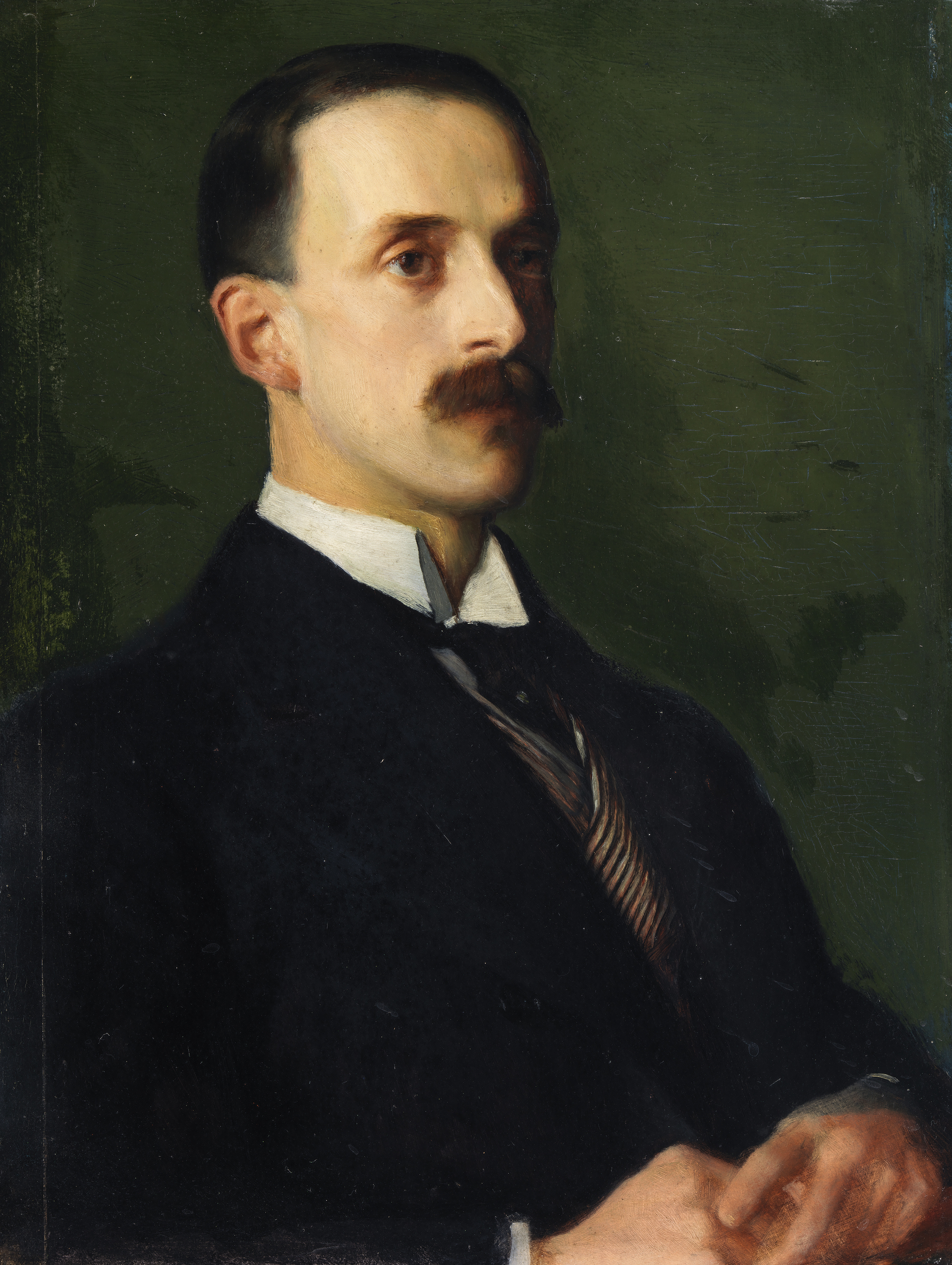
Sir Hugh Lane, 1914, by Sarah Cecilia Harrison

Lane was born in Ireland, grew up in England and elsewhere in Europe, and worked for most of his career as an art dealer in London. He died in the sinking of the Lusitania in 1915, on the return from a visit to New York to finalise the sale of Holbein's portrait of Thomas Cromwell and Titian's Portrait of a Man in a Red Cap to Henry Clay Frick; both are now in the Frick Collection.

For several years, Lane had been working on a project to establish a gallery of modern art in Dublin. The Municipal Gallery of Modern Art opened at temporary premises at Clonmell House on Harcourt Street in 1908, and Lane commissioned two designs for a new permanent gallery from Edwin Lutyens. The plans were rejected by Dublin City Council, and the project which was to become the Hugh Lane Gallery was not fully realised at the time of his death. Frustrated at the lack of progress in Dublin, Lane sent his collection on loan to the National Gallery in London in 1913.

Lane's will of October 1913 also bequeathed his collection to the National Gallery, but Lane had been appointed director of the National Gallery of Ireland (NGI) in early 1914, and after his death a codicil dated February 1915 was discovered in his office which changed the destination of the bequest to the NGI in Dublin. The codicil was signed and dated but not formally witnessed and so it was legally ineffective, and the National Gallery took ownership of the paintings that were already in its hands, on loan.

In the following decades, Lane's aunt, Augusta, Lady Gregory, and a later director of the NGI, Thomas Bodkin, took up the campaign for the paintings to be returned to Ireland as Lane had intended. The Hugh Lane Gallery opened at Charlemont House in Parnell Square, Dublin in 1933.

== Agreements between galleries ==
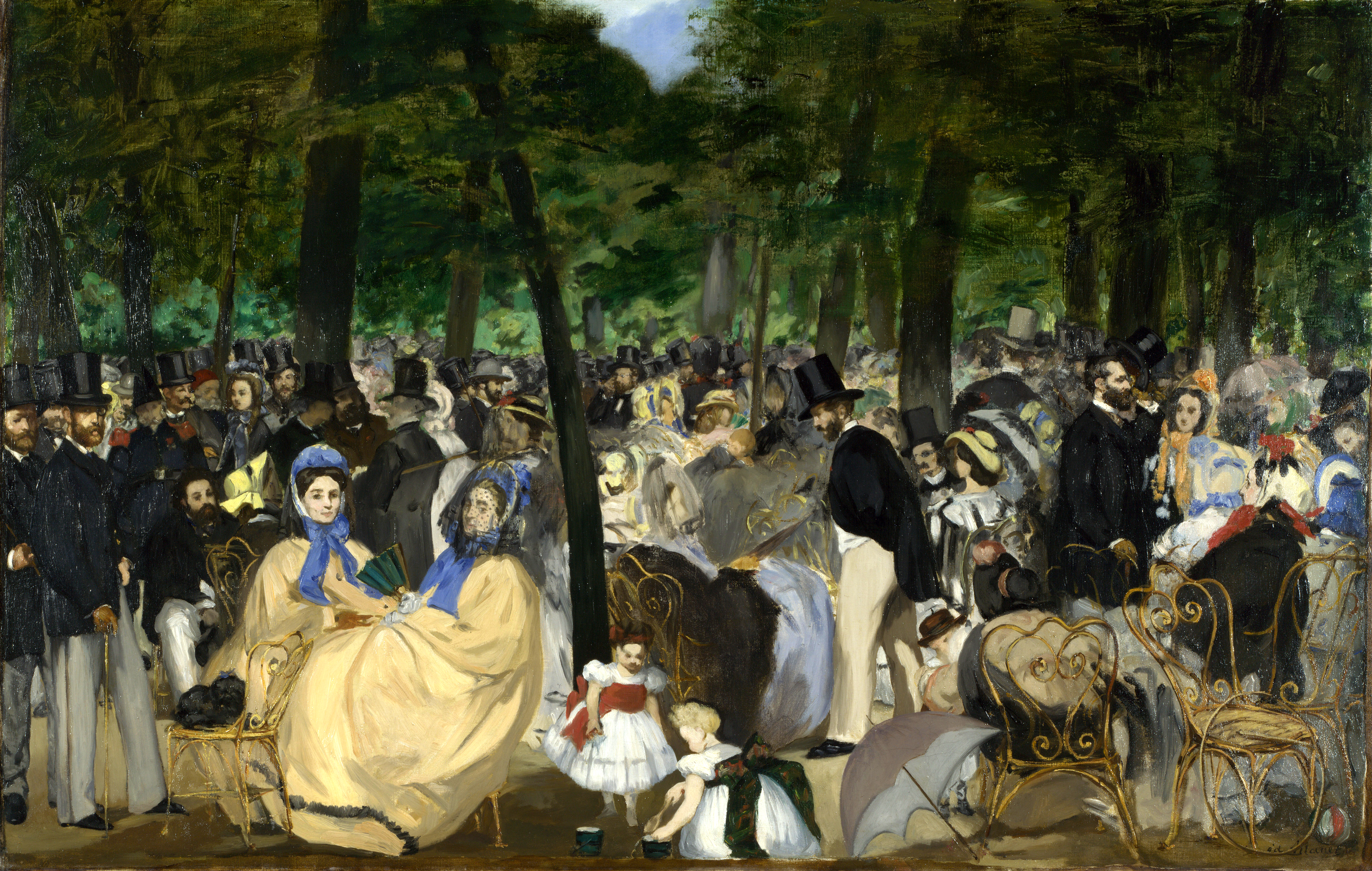
Édouard Manet, Music in the Tuileries, NG3260

In 1959, it was agreed between the National Gallery in London and the NGI in Dublin that half of the collection would be retained in London, and the other half would be displayed on loan to the Hugh Lane Gallery in Dublin, with the two halves being exchanged every five years over the next two decades. The National Gallery retained ownership, as the National Gallery Act 1856 did not permit its trustees to deaccession works bequeathed to the nation.

The agreement to share the works was renewed for 14 years from 1979, and amended so that 30 paintings would be loaned to Dublin for the whole period, and eight paintings would remain in London. The 39th painting – Renoir's The Umbrellas – would be displayed in Dublin for the first seven years, then in London for the next seven years.

The agreement was renewed and amended again in 1993, this time for 12 years, with 27 paintings remaining on long-term loan in Dublin, and four remaining in London. The final eight works were allocated into two groups of four, with one group first displayed in Dublin and the second group first in London, and the groups exchanged after six years. This allocation, and the six-yearly rotation of eight paintings, continued until 2021, interrupted by an exhibition in Dublin in 2008 which collected 38 of the paintings at the Hugh Lane Gallery in Parnell Square for its 100th anniversary: the 39th work was too large to fit in the building.

A new agreement was reached in 2021, for 10 years, exchanging two groups of five paintings after five years. Two works will be kept permanently in London, with the other 27 kept in Dublin.

== Works ==
The 39 works are catalogued by the National Gallery as NG3233 to NG3271 (inclusive). The collection includes paintings by Edgar Degas, Claude Monet, Berthe Morisot, Camille Pissarro, and Pierre-Auguste Renoir; two by Édouard Manet; three by or after Jean-Baptiste-Camille Corot; four by or after Gustave Courbet; and four by Antonio Mancini. A painting of Skating in Holland, purportedly signed by Johan Jongkind, is a forgery.

=== London, 2021–2025; then Dublin, 2026–2031 ===
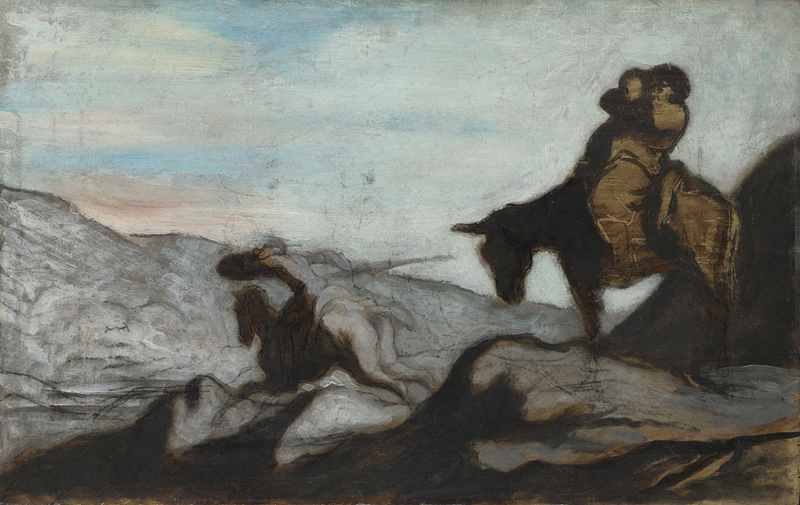
Honoré Daumier, Don Quixote and Sancho Panza, NG3244

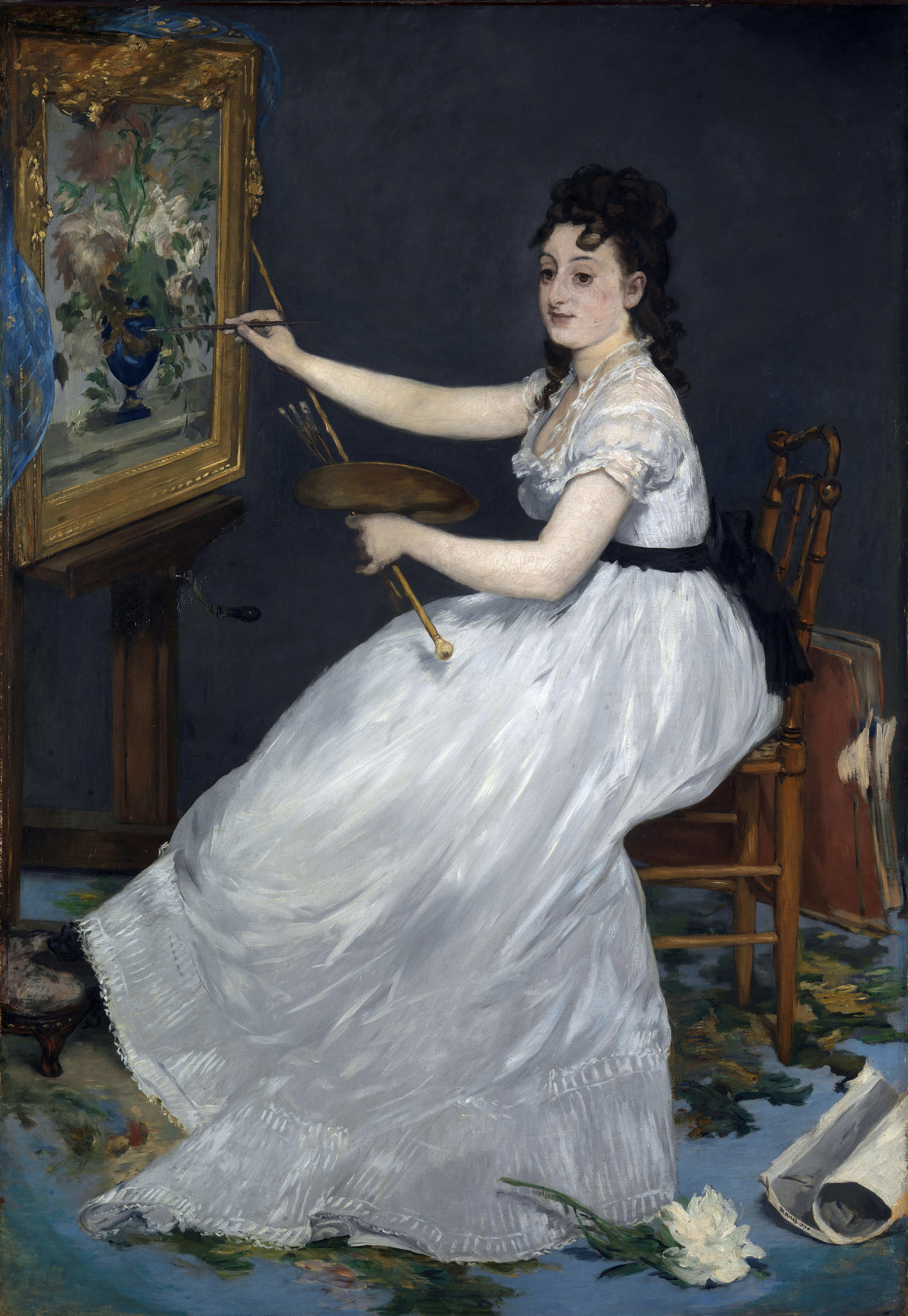
Édouard Manet, Portrait of Eva Gonzalès, NG3259

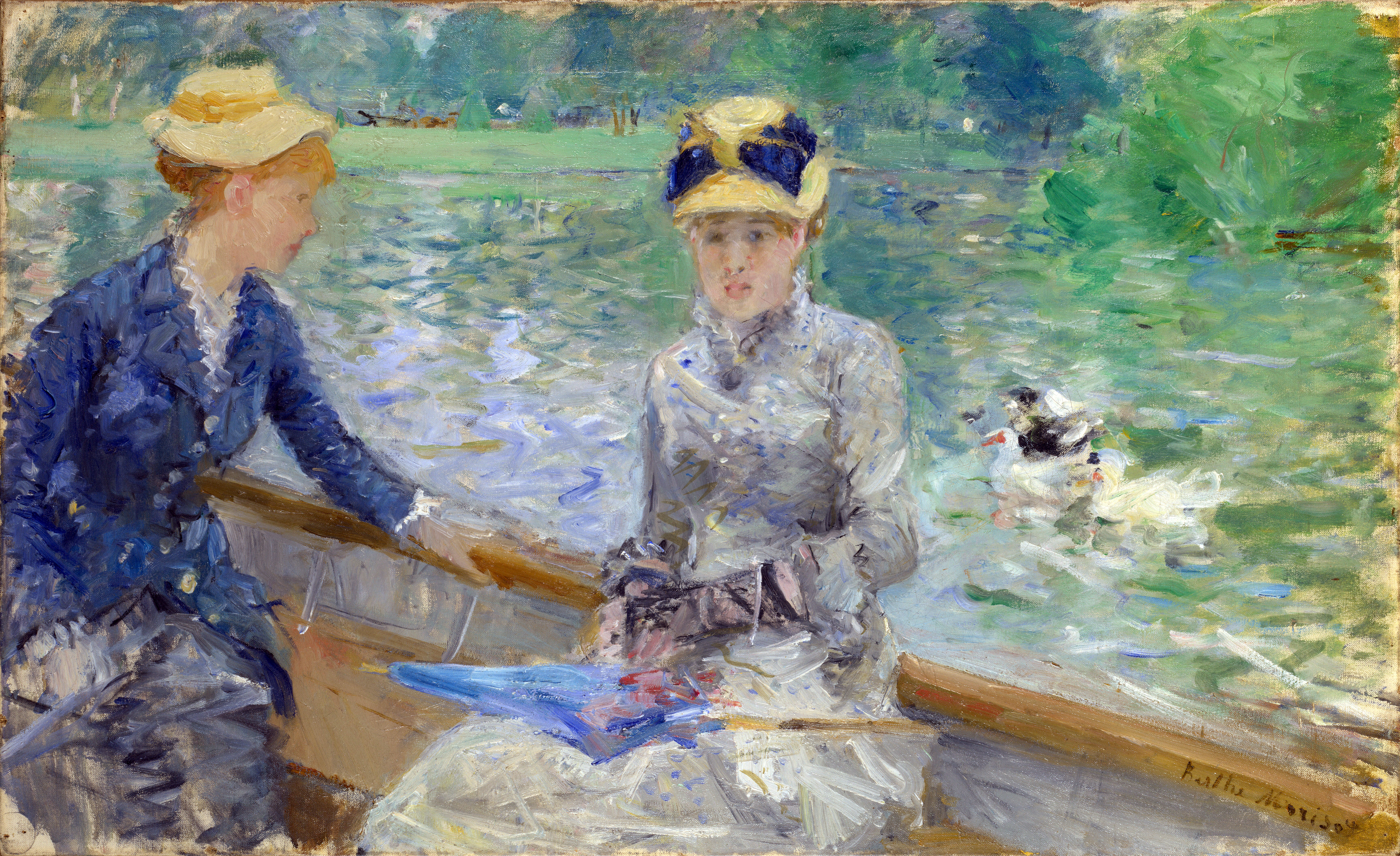
Berthe Morisot, Summer's Day, NG3264

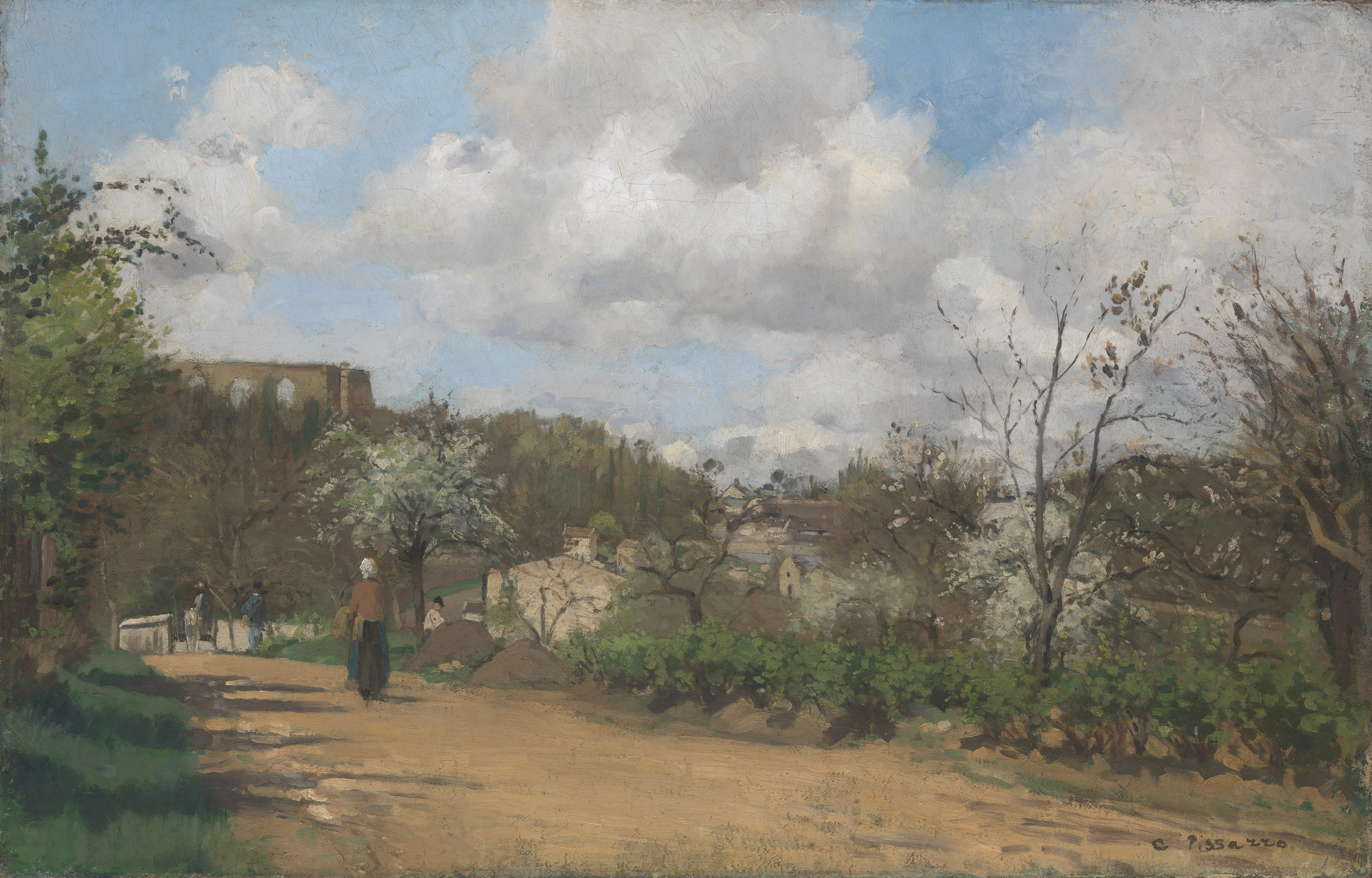
Camille Pissarro, View from Louveciennes, NG3265

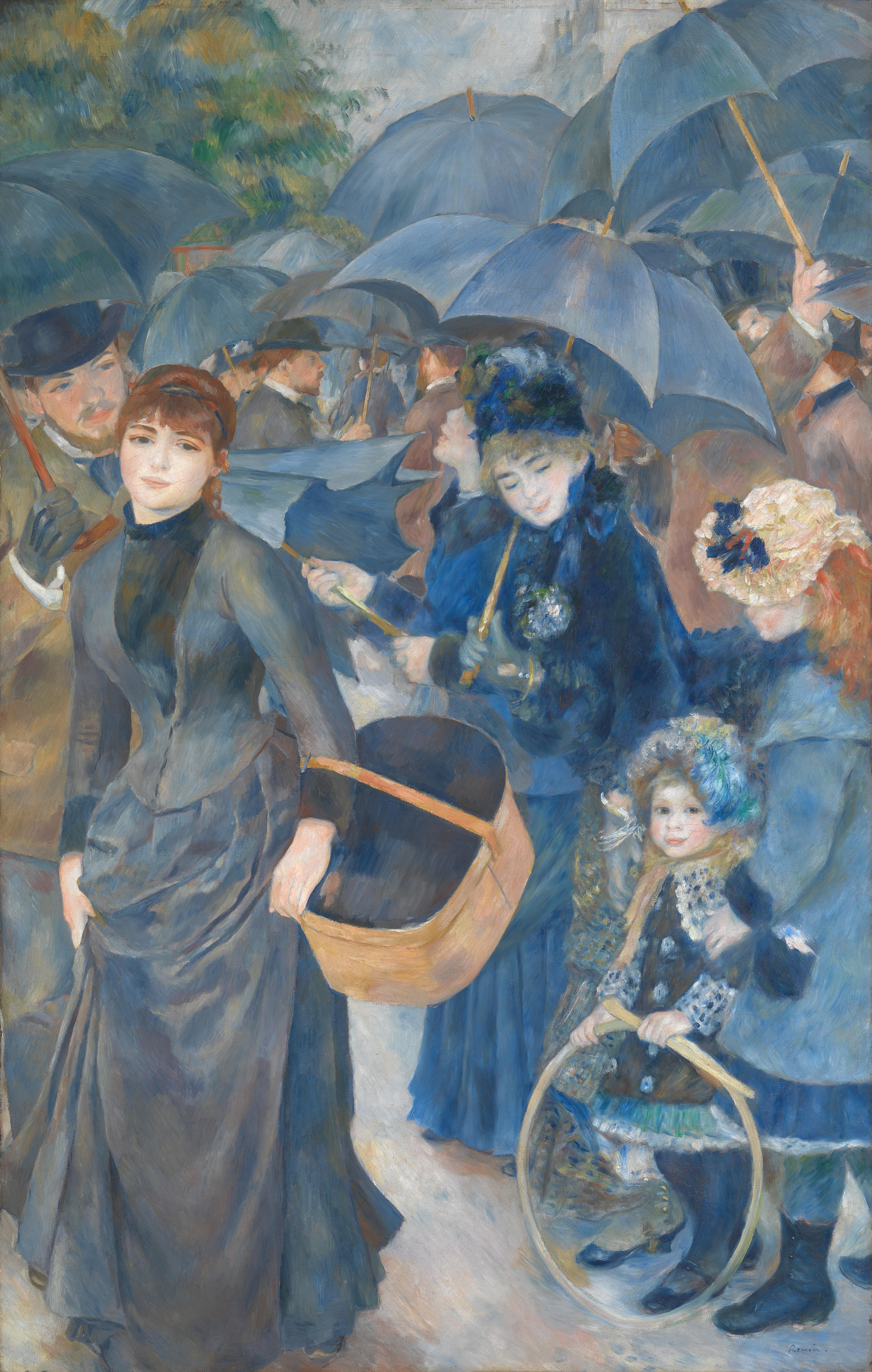
Pierre-Auguste Renoir, The Umbrellas, NG3268

=== Dublin, 2012–2026; then London, 2026–2031 ===
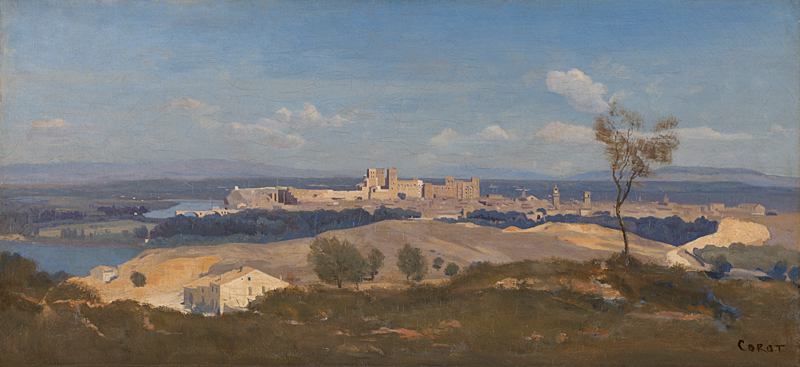
Jean-Baptiste-Camille Corot, Avignon from the West, NG3237

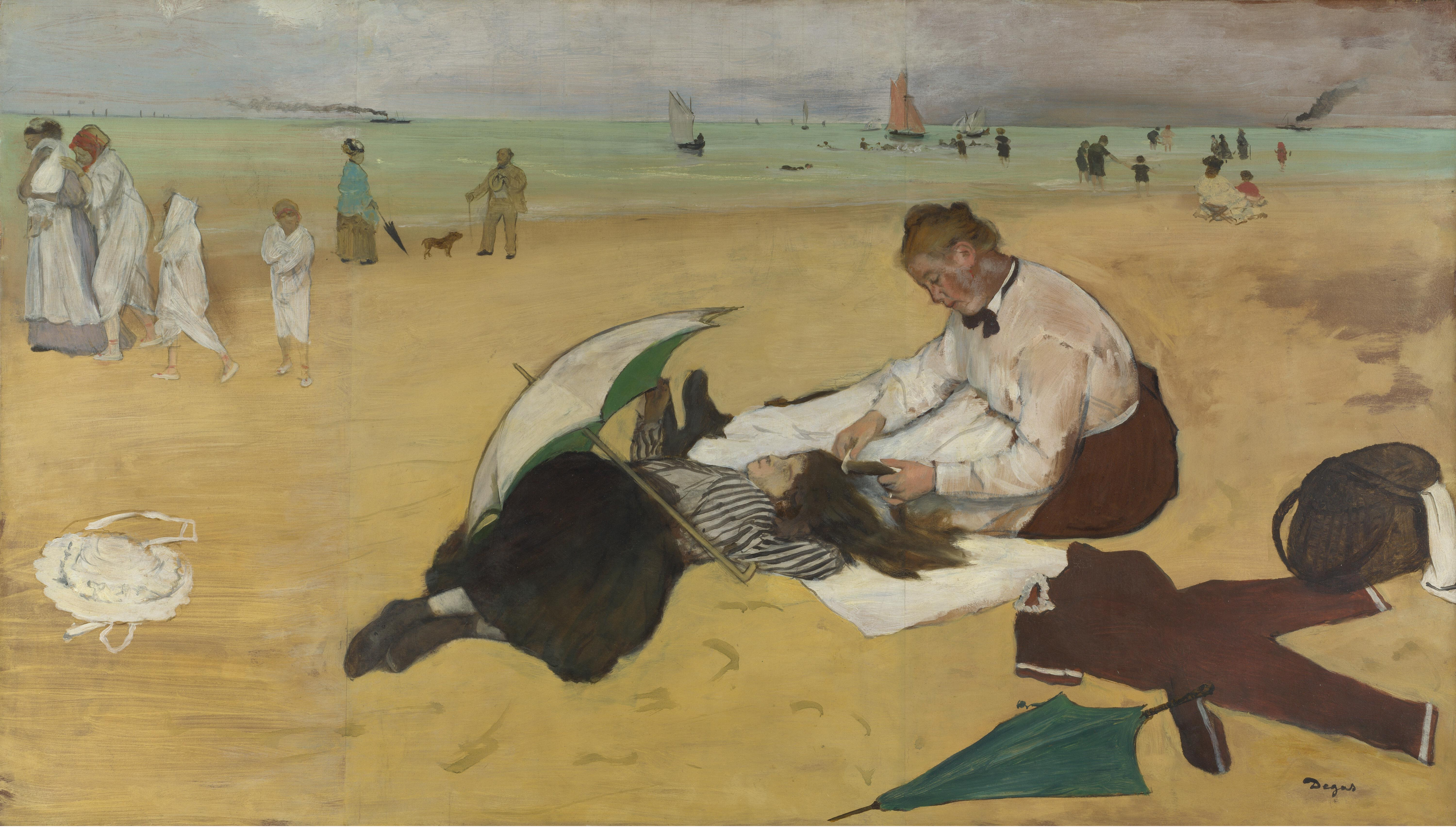
Edgar Degas, Beach Scene, NG3247

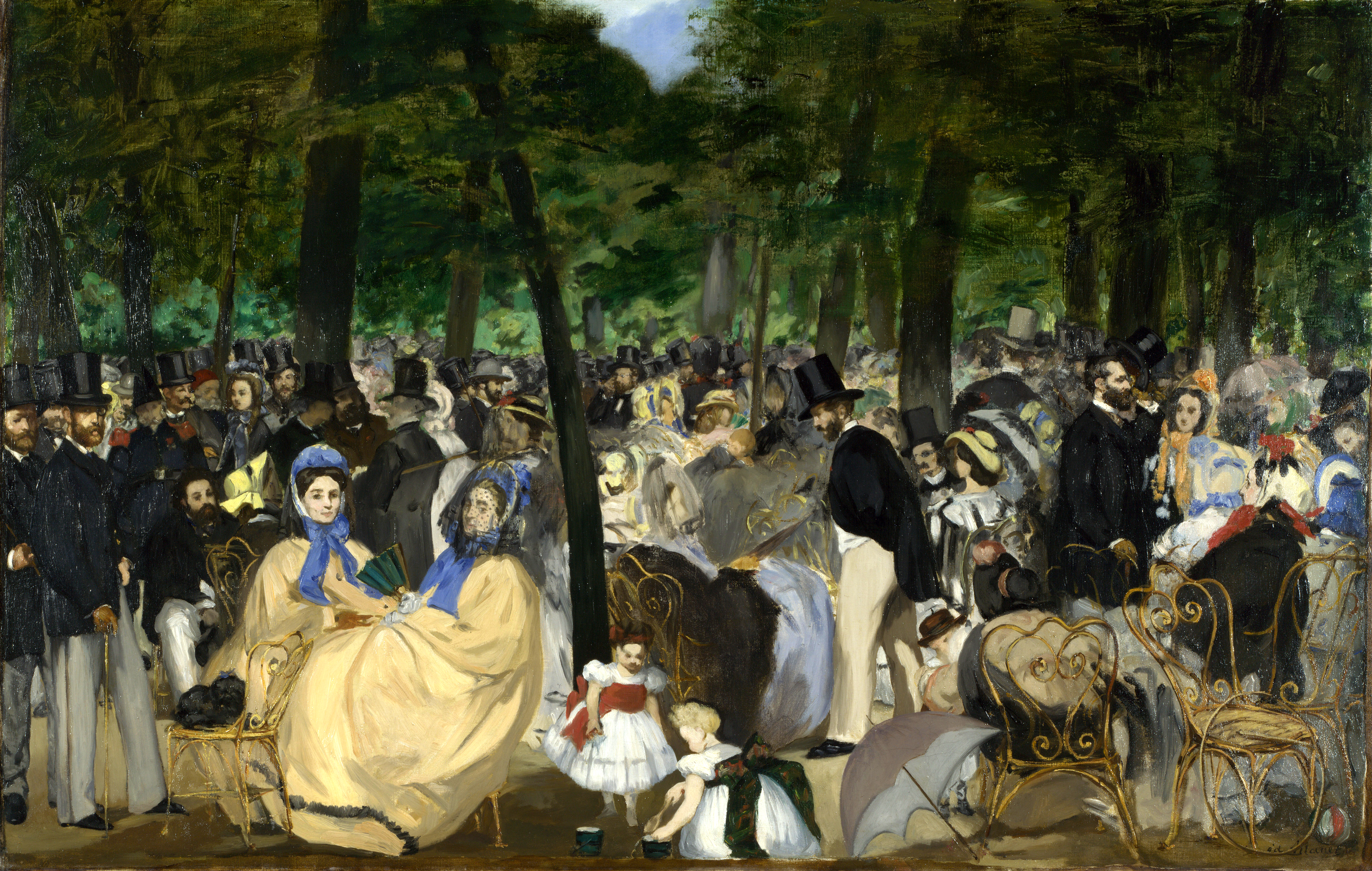
Édouard Manet, Music in the Tuileries, NG3260

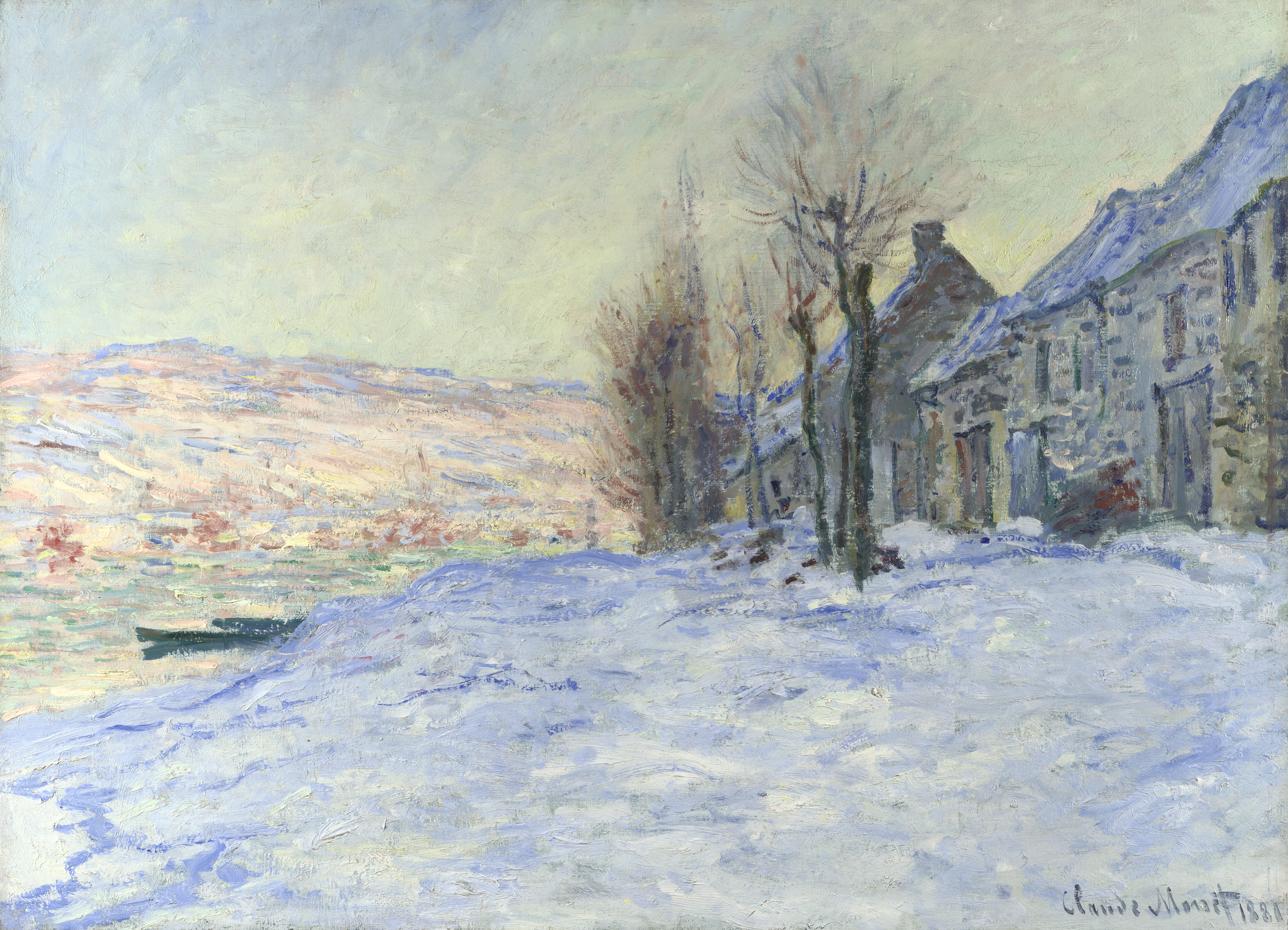
Claude Monet, Lavacourt under Snow, NG3262

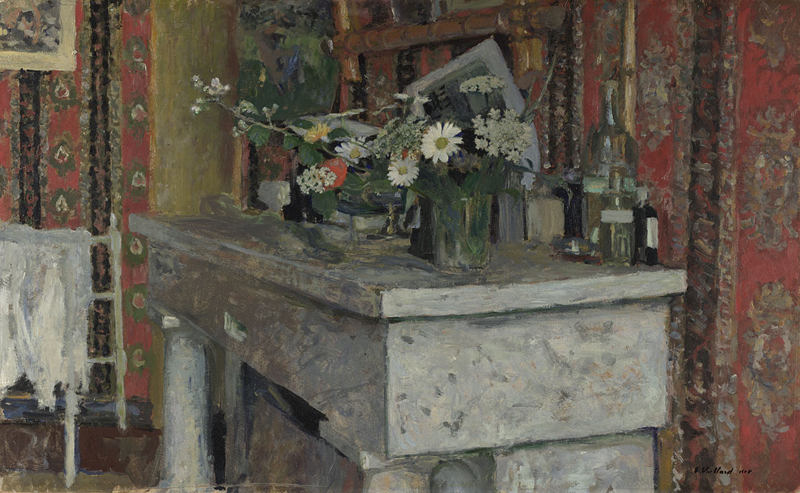
Édouard Vuillard, The Mantelpiece, NG3271

=== London, until 2031 ===
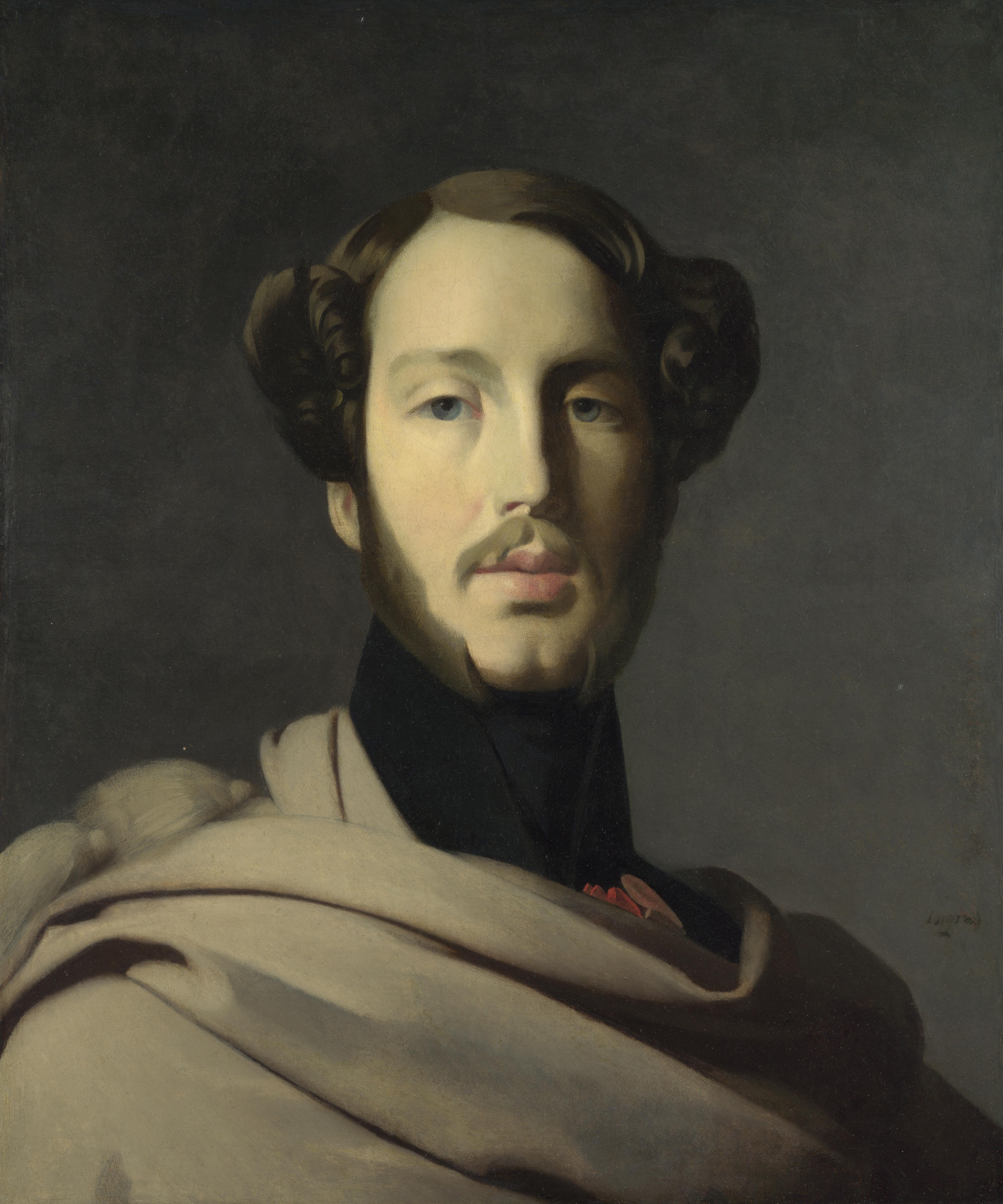
Studio of Ingres, Portrait of the Duc d'Orléans, NG3252

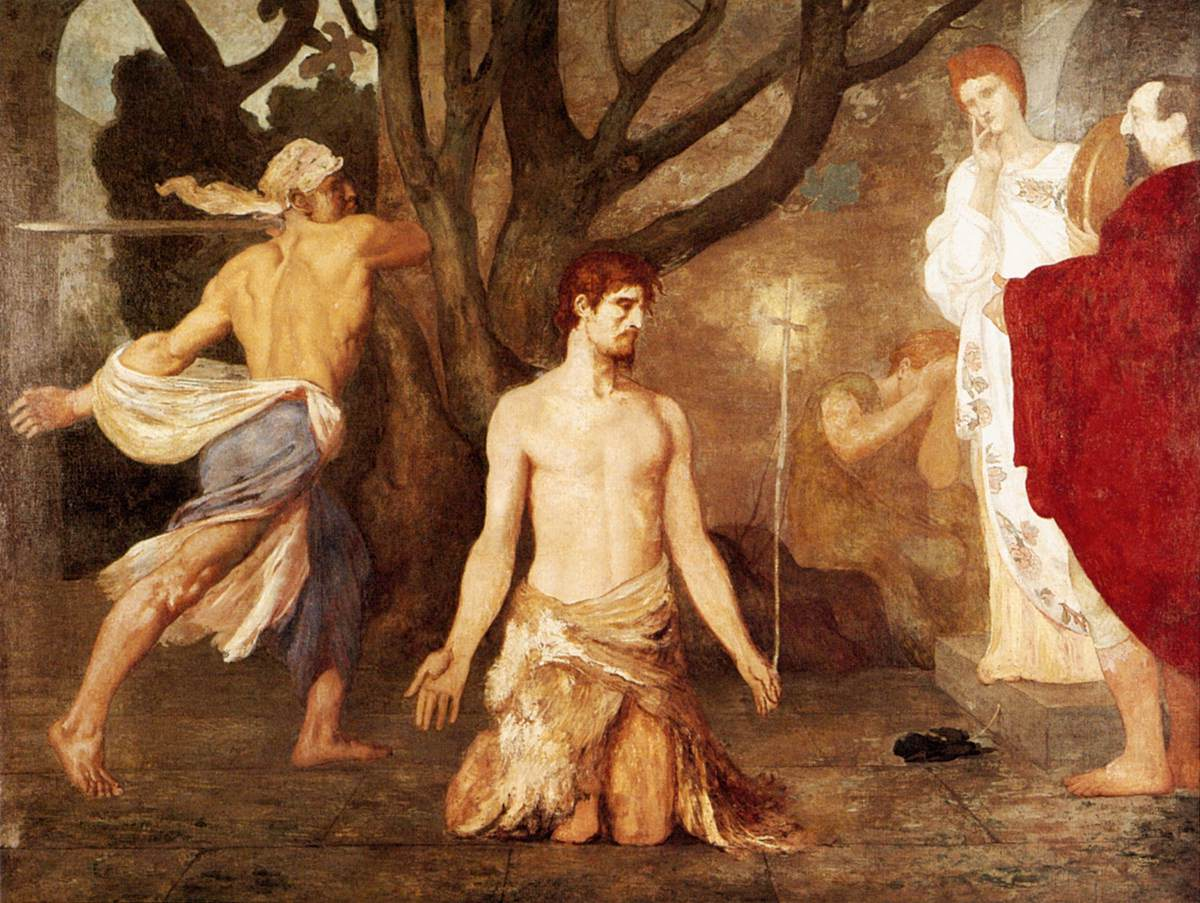
Pierre Puvis de Chavannes, Beheading of John the Baptist, NG3266

=== Dublin, until 2031 ===
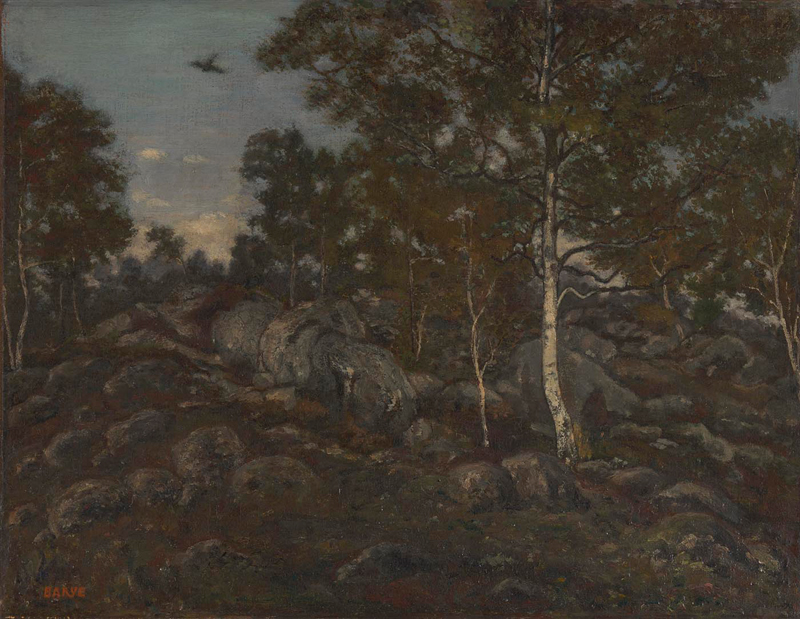
Antoine-Louis Barye, The Forest of Fontainebleau, NG3233

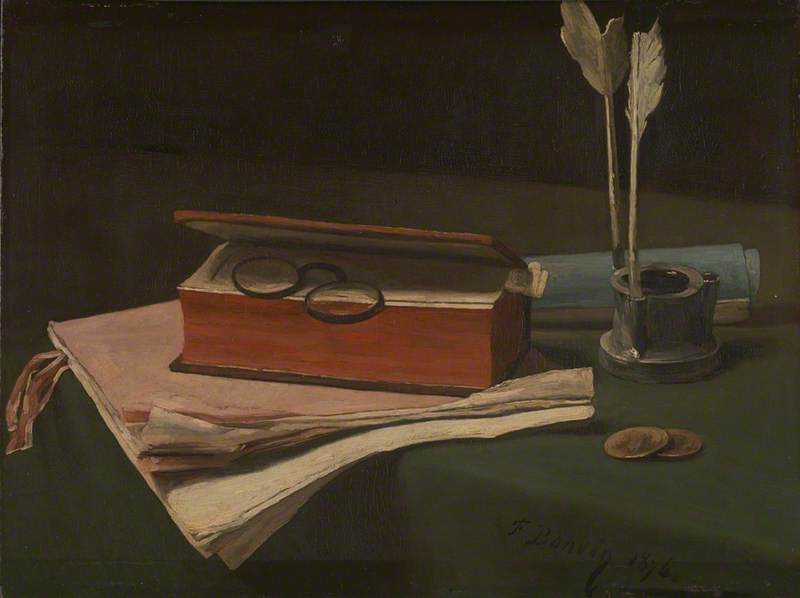
François Bonvin, Still Life with Books, Papers and Inkwell, NG3234

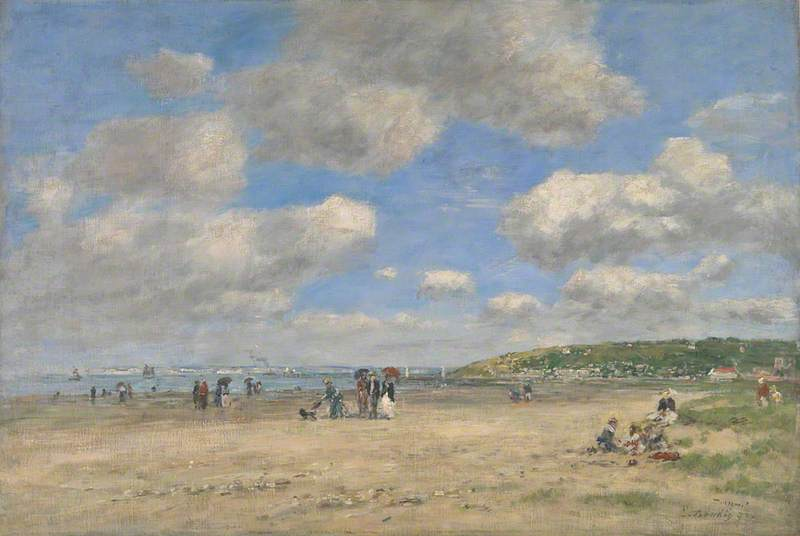
Eugène Louis Boudin, The Beach at Tourgéville-les-Sablons, NG3235

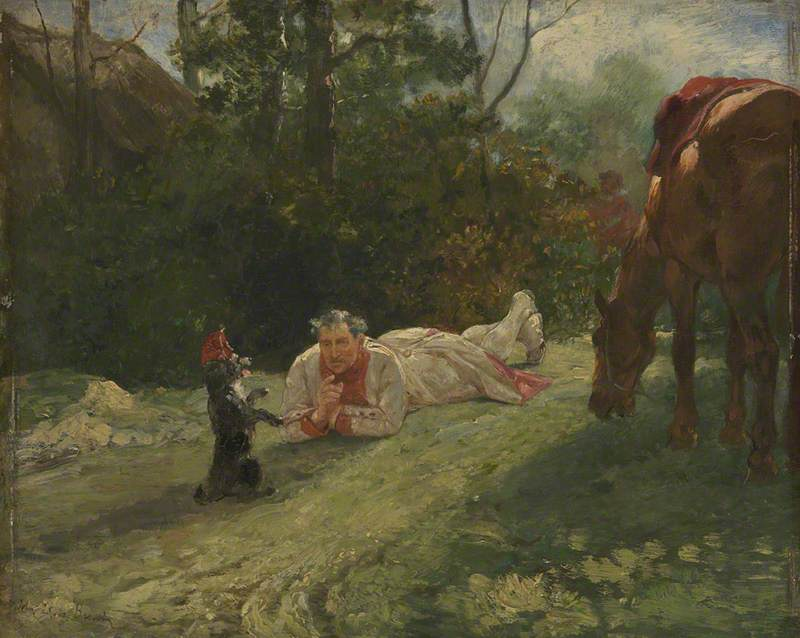
John Lewis Brown, The Performing Dog, NG3236

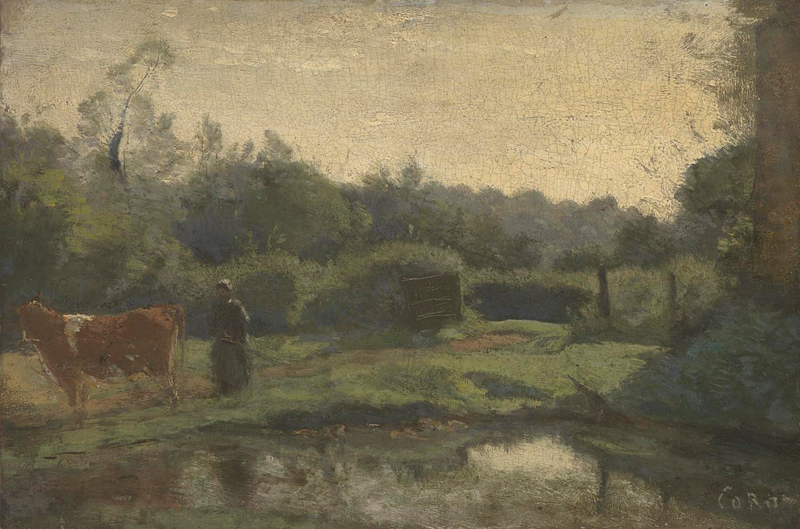
Jean-Baptiste-Camille Corot, Summer Morning, NG3238

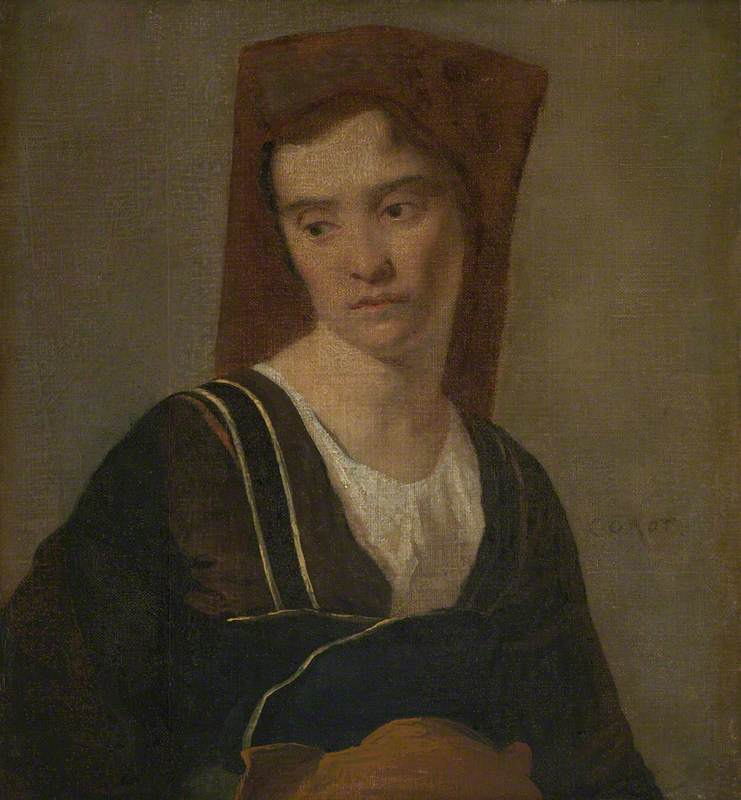
Follower of Corot, A Peasant Woman, NG3239

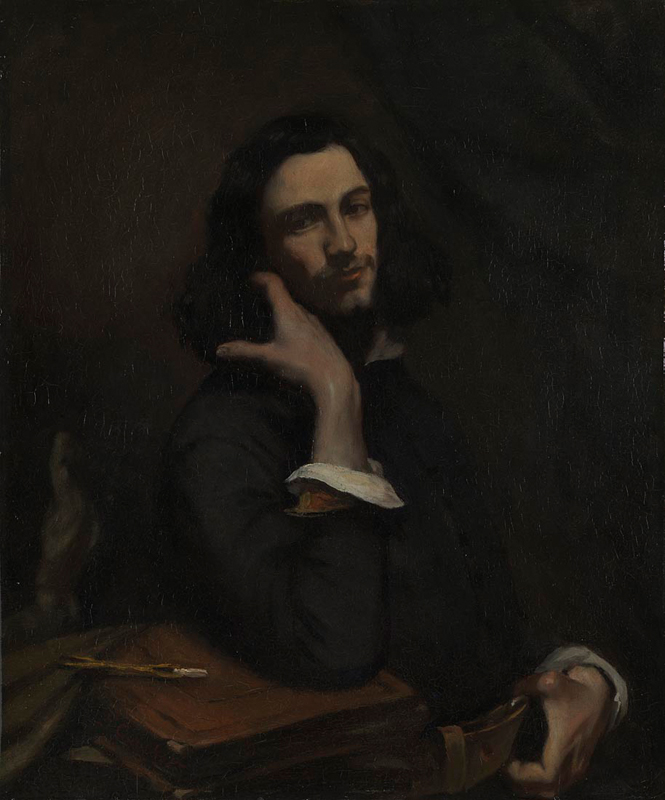
After Gustave Courbet, Self Portrait, NG3240

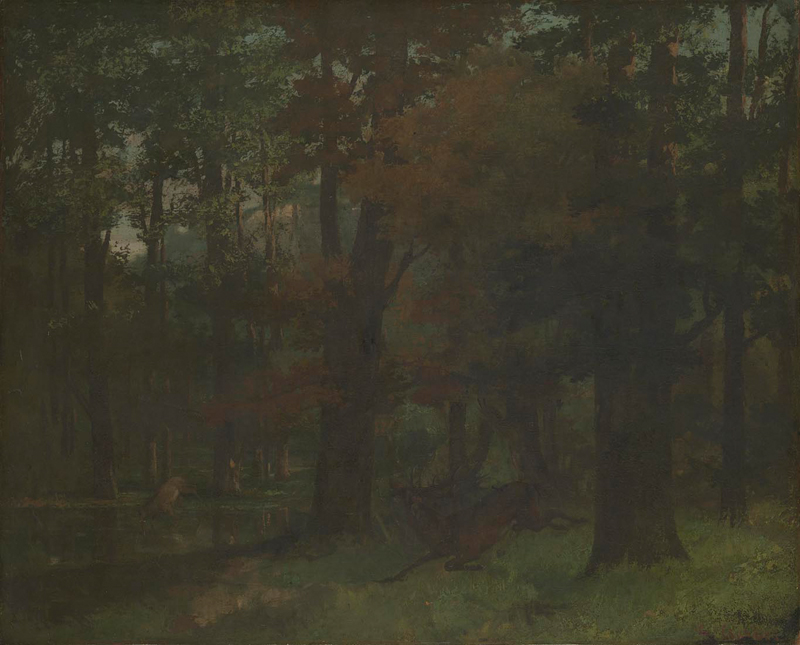
Gustave Courbet, In the Forest, NG3241

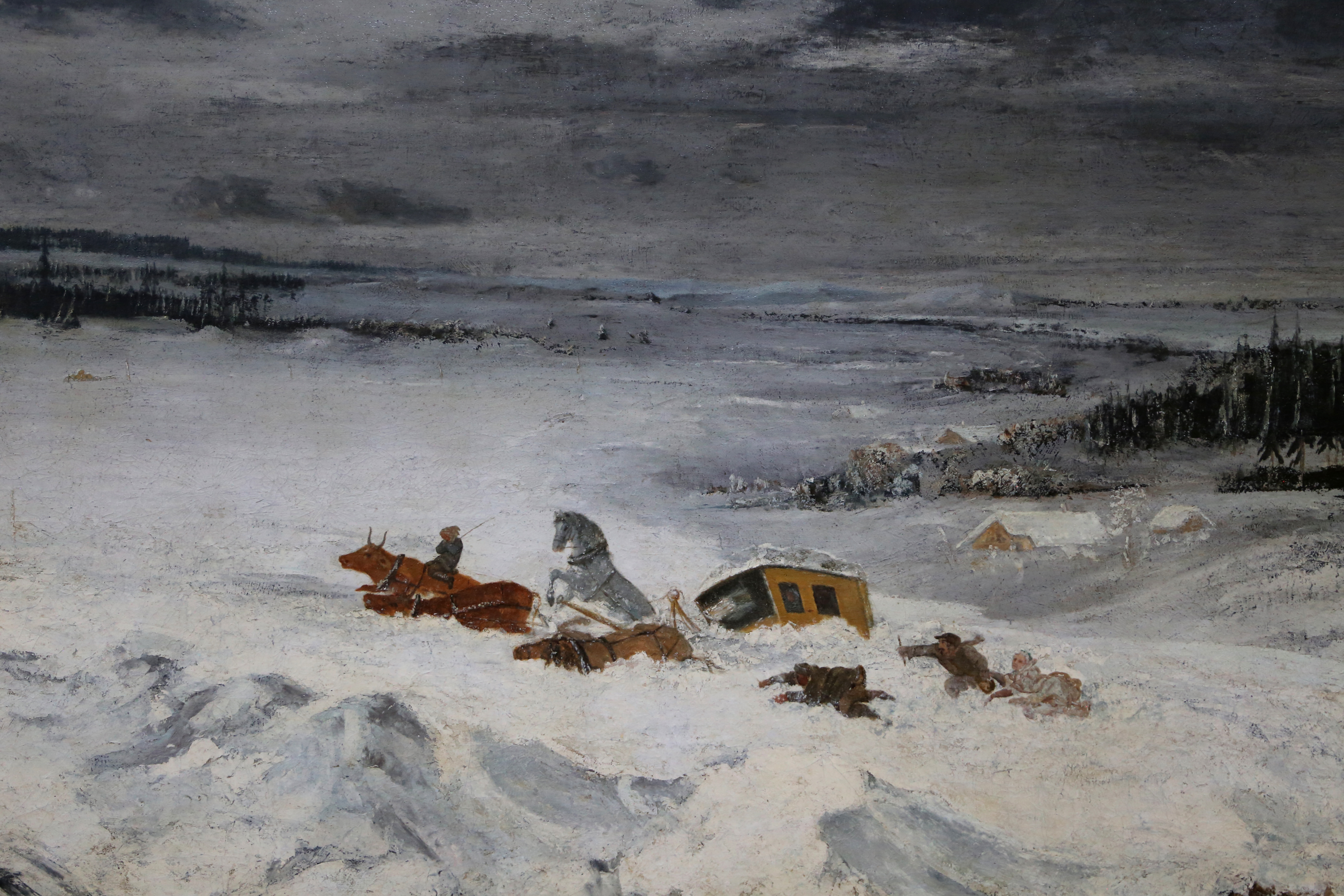
Gustave Courbet, The Diligence in the Snow, NG3242

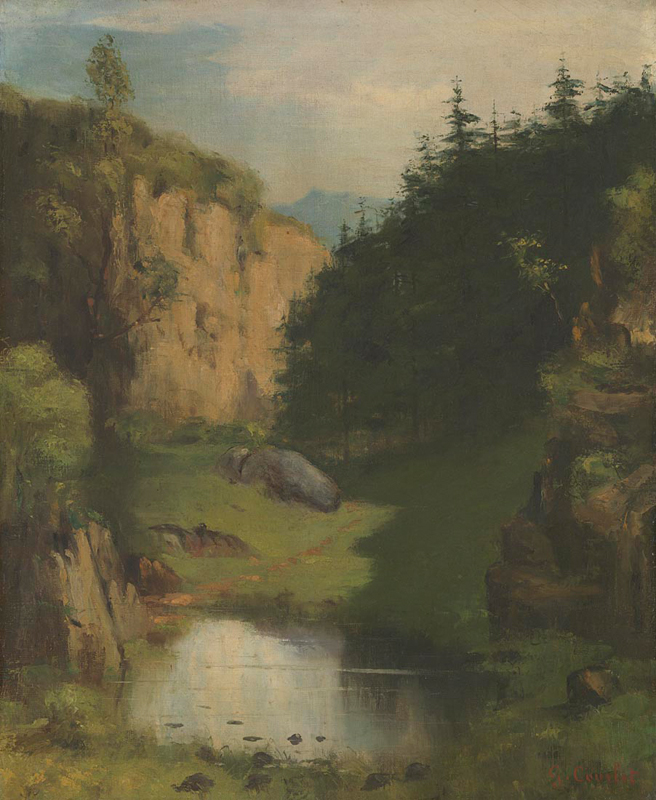
Studio of Gustave Courbet, The Pool, NG3243

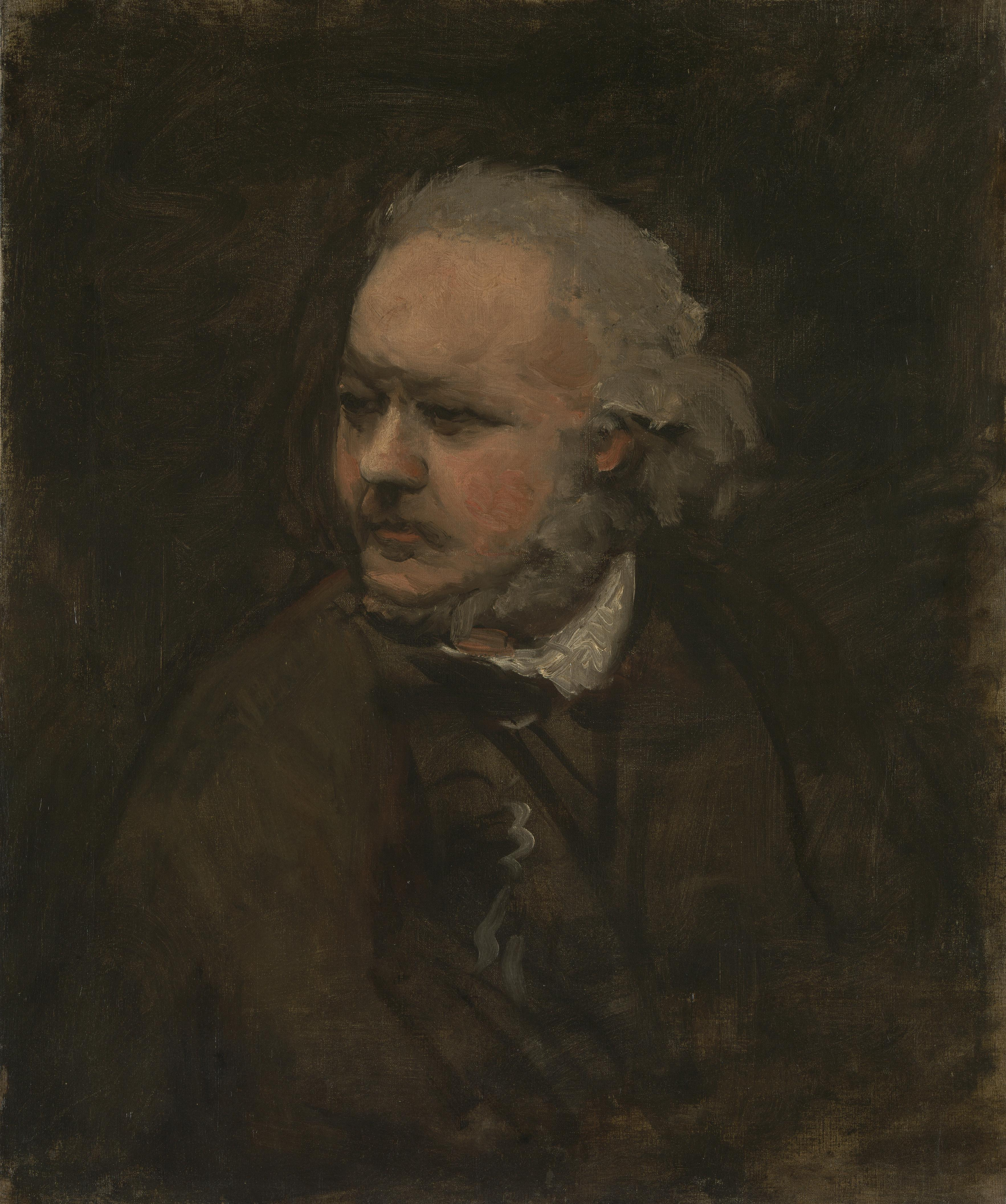
Charles-François Daubigny, Portrait of Honoré Daumier, NG3245

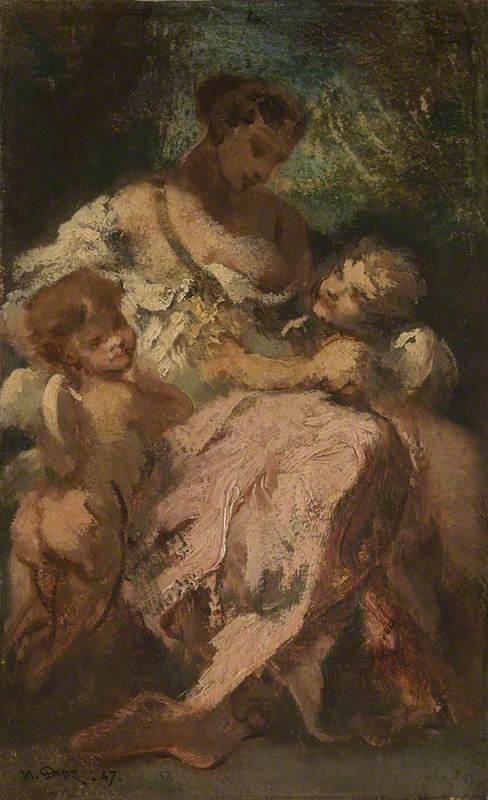
Narcisse Virgilio Díaz de la Peña, Venus and Two Cupids, NG3246

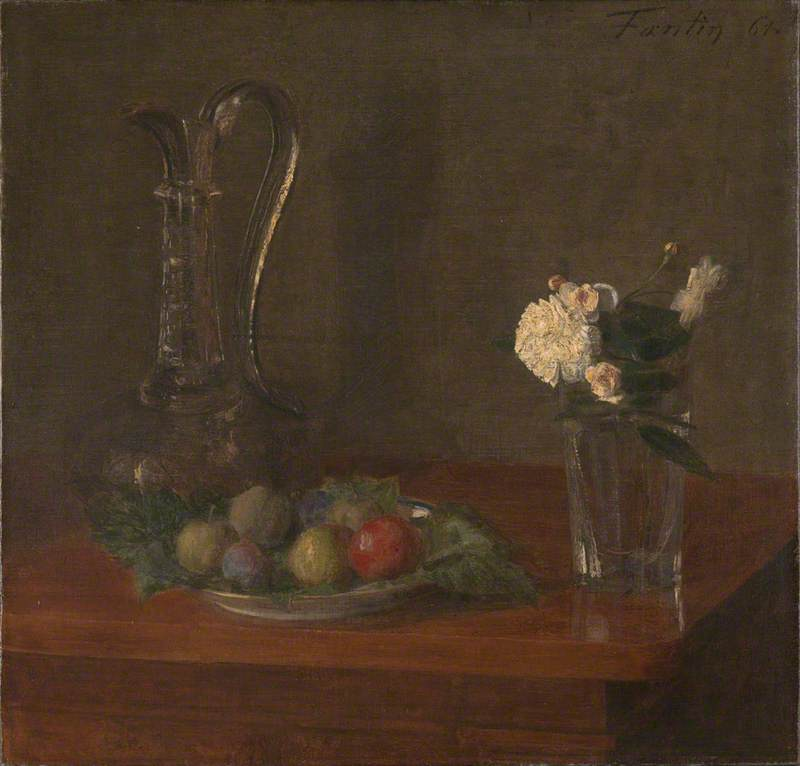
Henri Fantin-Latour, Still Life with Glass Jug, Fruit and Flowers, NG3248

Jean-Louis Forain, Legal Assistance, NG3249

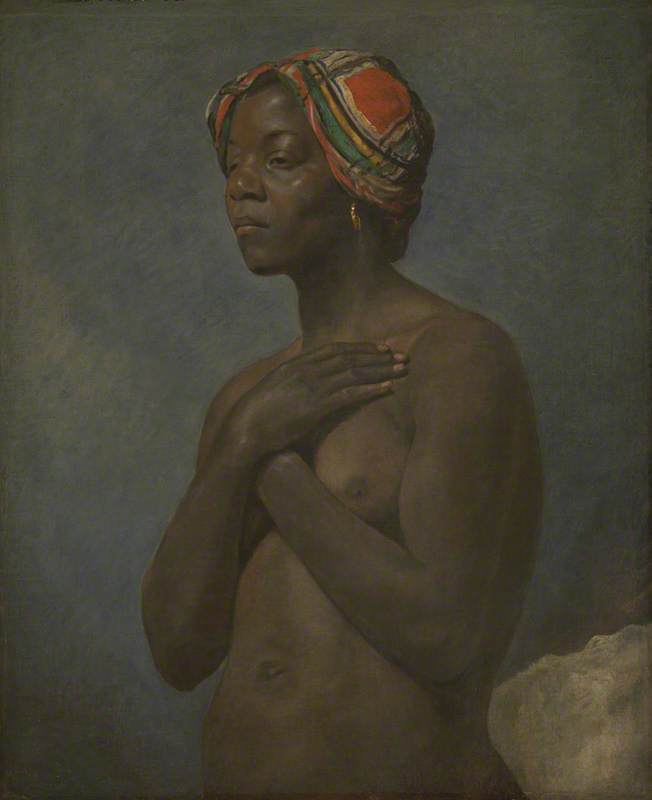
French School, A Black Woman, NG3250

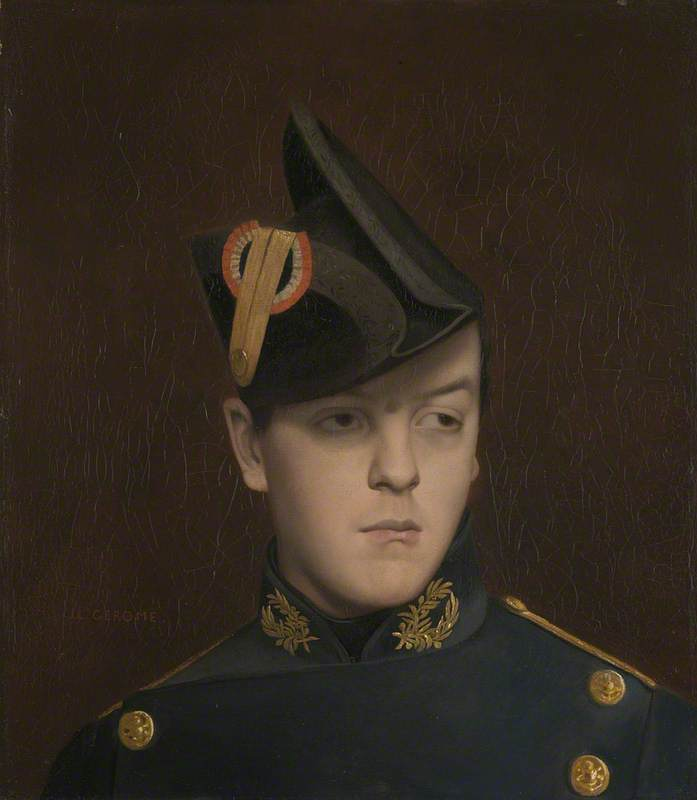
Jean-Léon Gérôme, Portrait of Claude-Armand Gérôme, NG3251

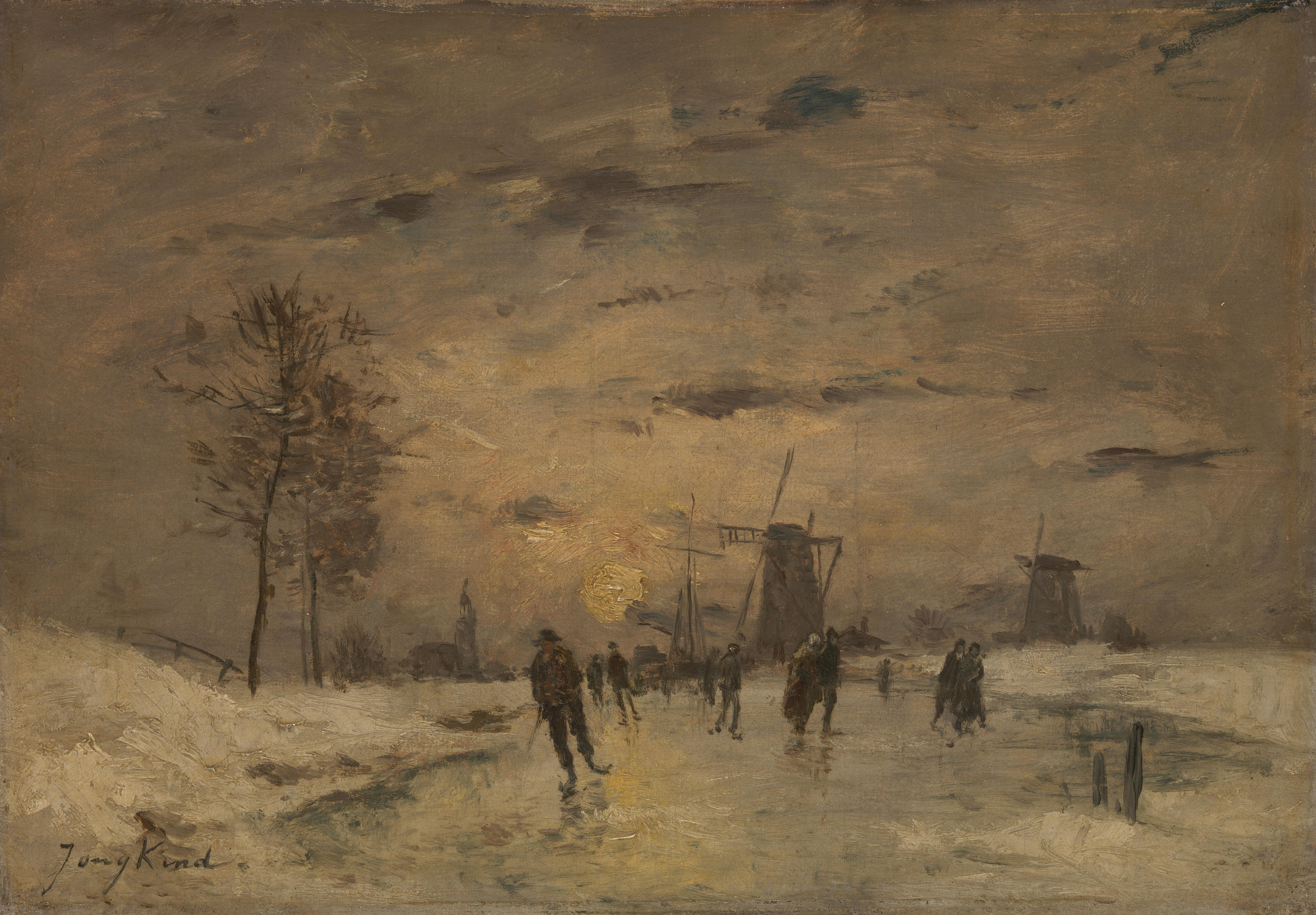
Imitator of Johan Jongkind, Skating in Holland, NG3253

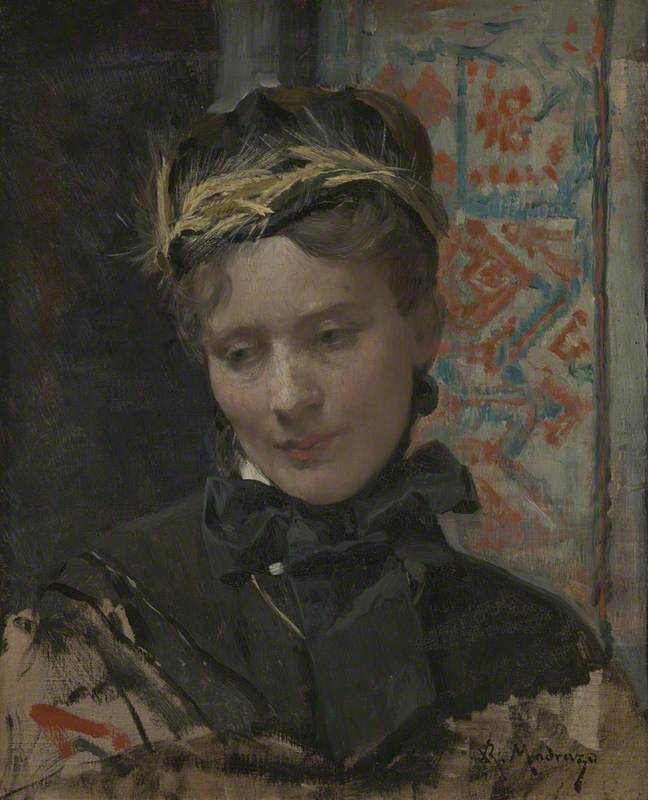
Raimundo de Madrazo y Garreta, Portrait of a Lady, NG3254

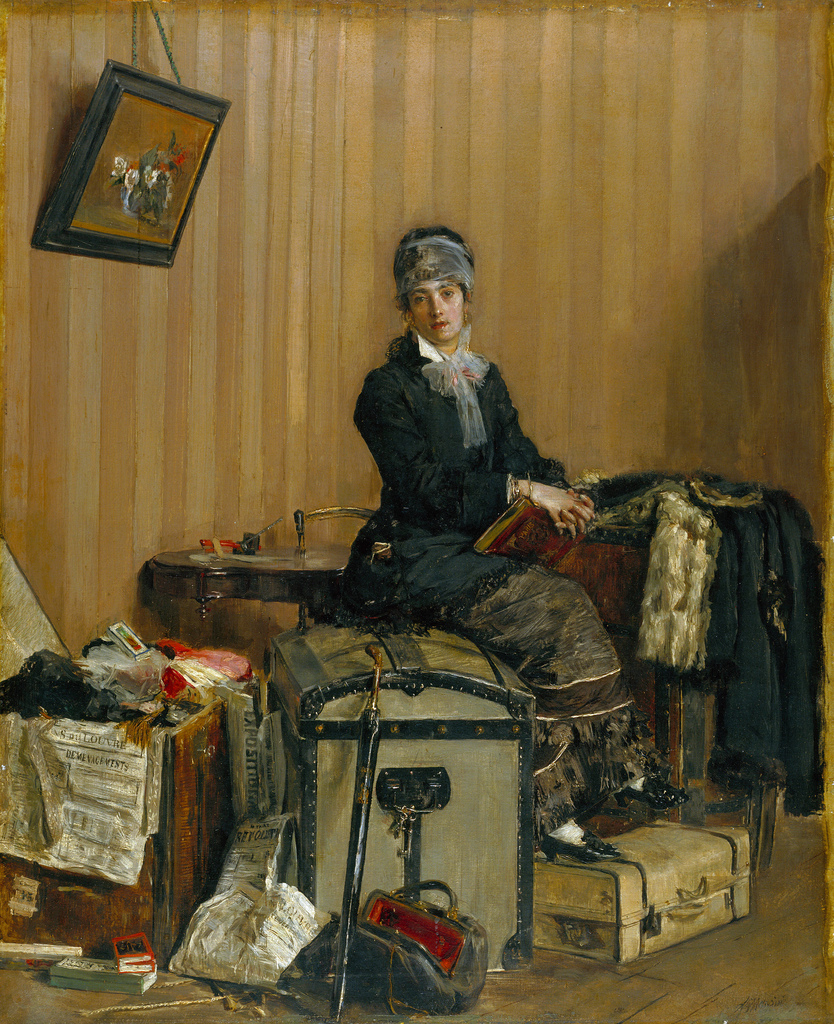
Antonio Mancini, Adieu Paris (The Customs), NG3255

Antonio Mancini, On a Journey (En Voyage), NG3256

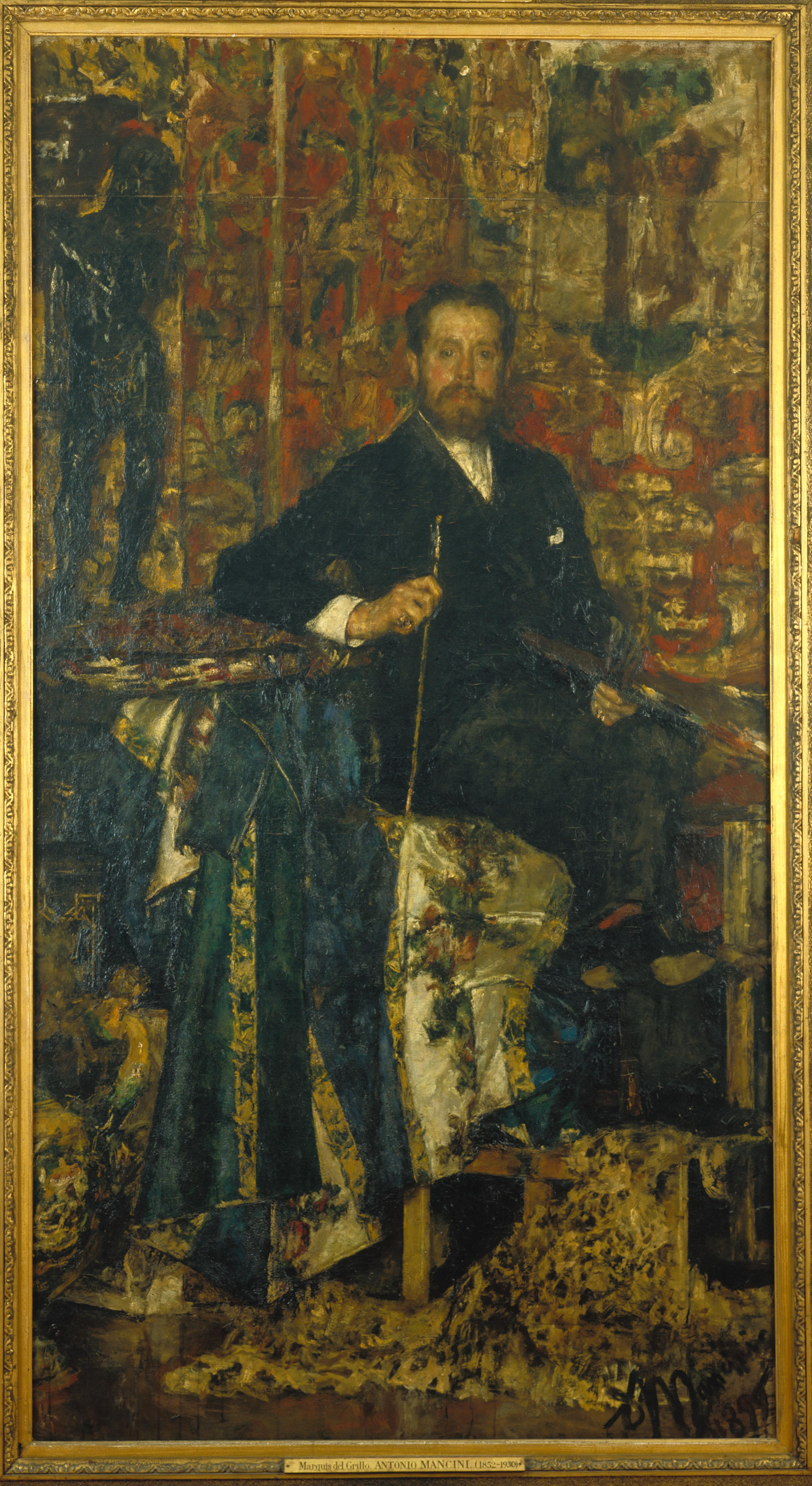
Antonio Mancini, Portrait of the Marquis del Grillo (Giuliano Capranica), NG3257

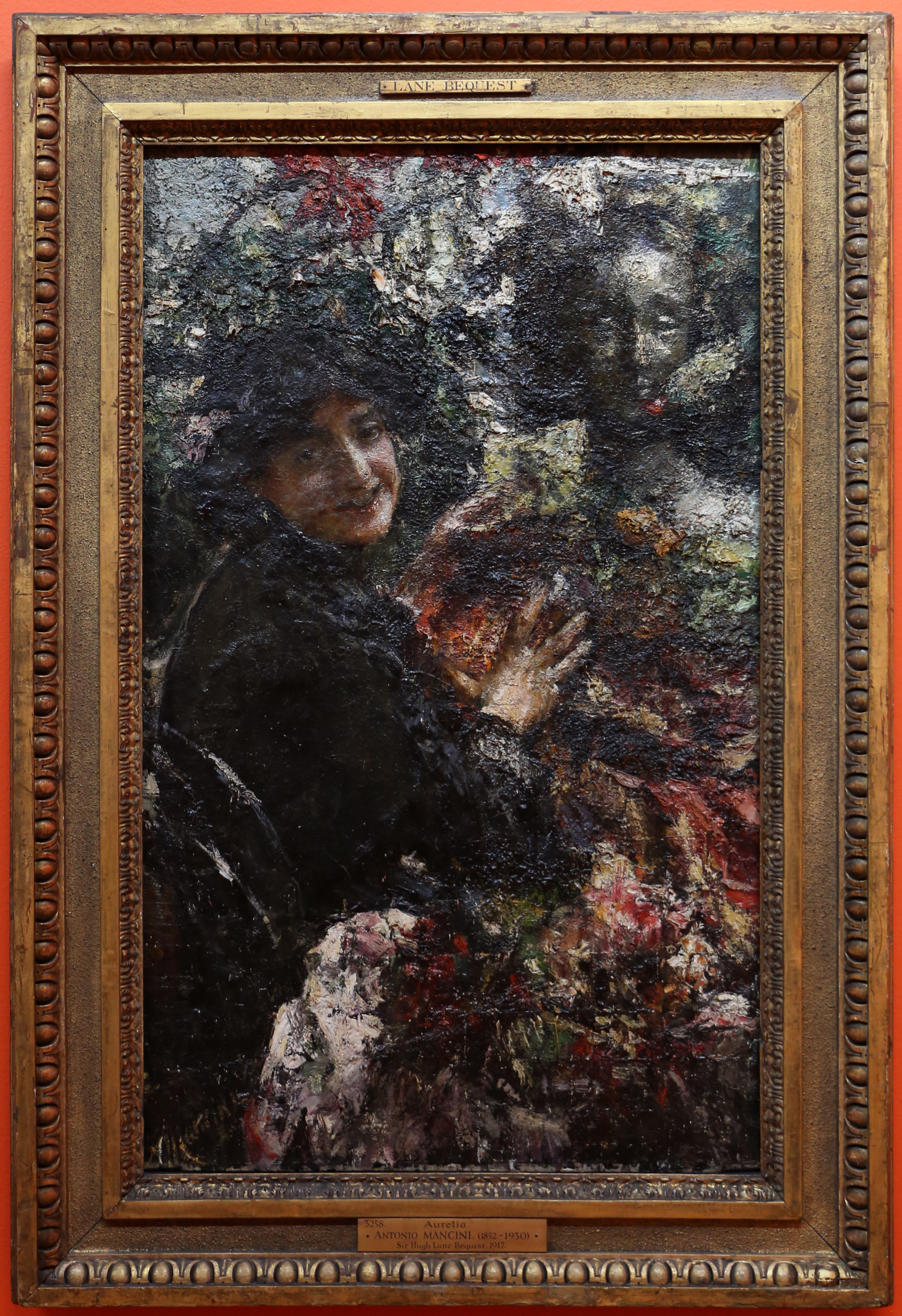
Antonio Mancini, Aurelia, NG3258

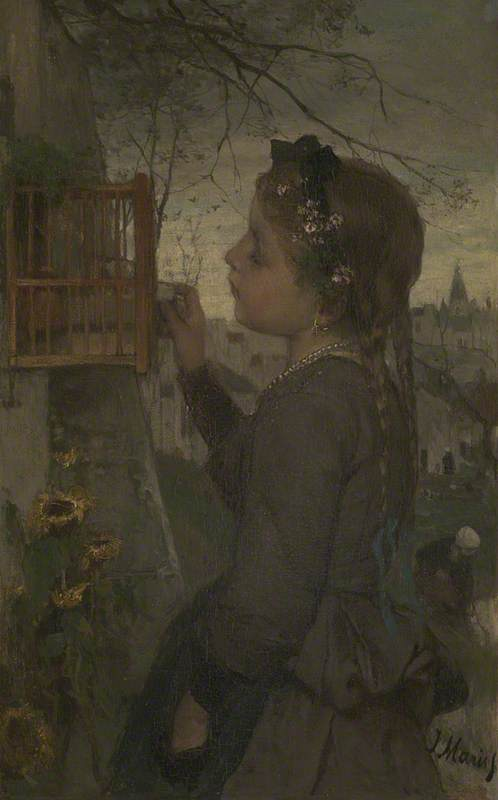
Jacob Maris, A Girl feeding a Bird in a Cage, NG3261

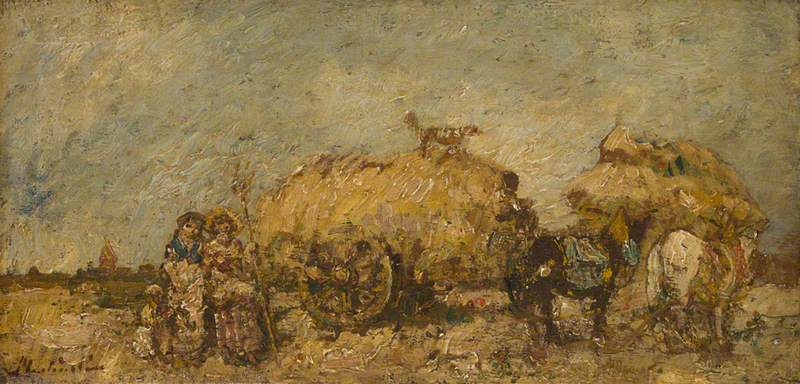
Adolphe Monticelli, The Hayfield, NG3263

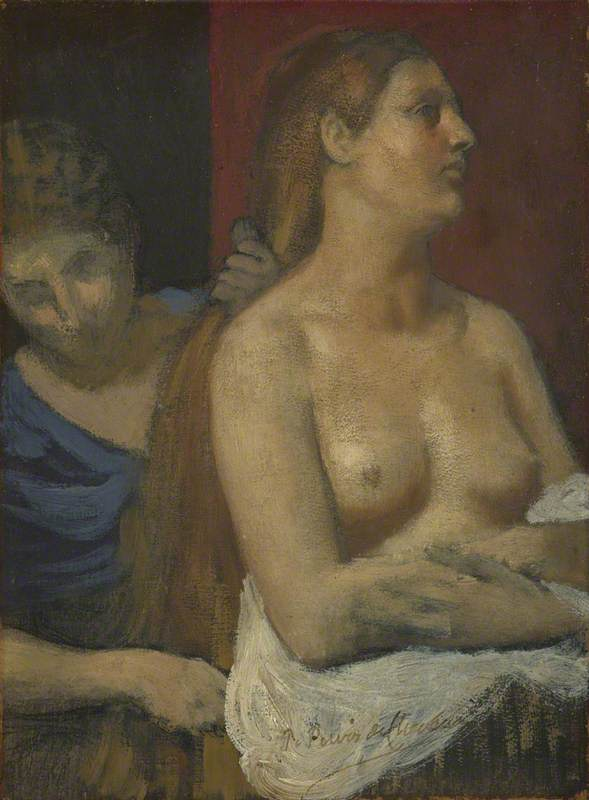
Pierre Puvis de Chavannes, A Maid Combing a Woman's Hair, NG3267

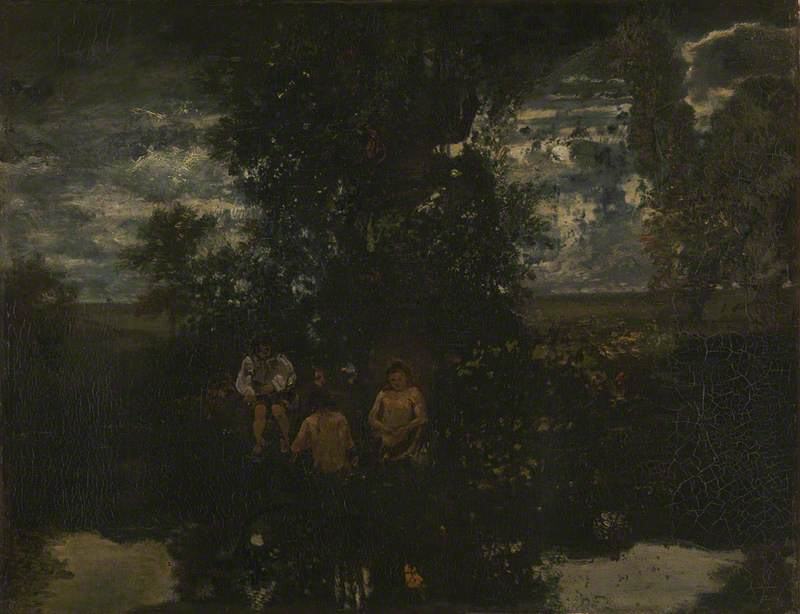
Possibly by Théodore Rousseau, Moonlight: The Bathers, NG3269

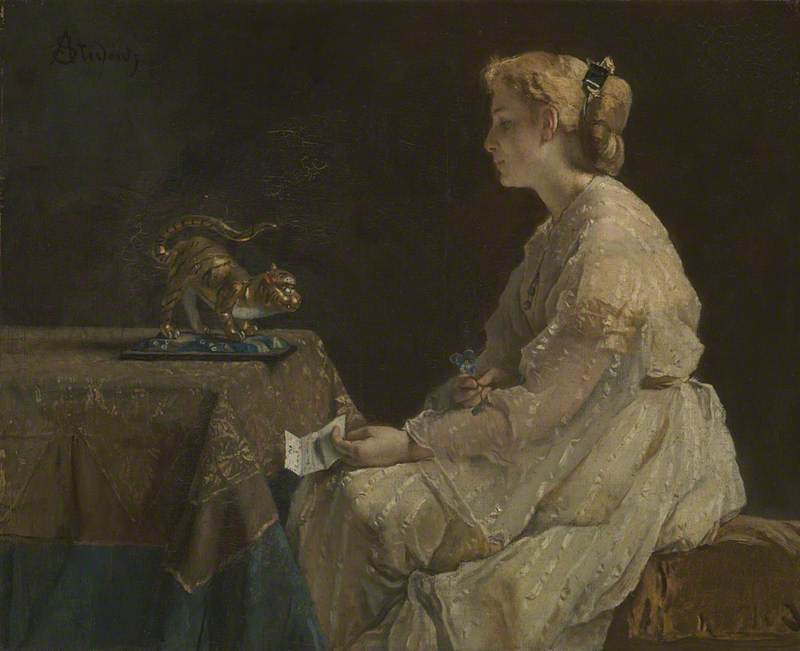
Alfred Stevens, The Present, NG3270
