= Music in the Tuileries =

Painting by Édouard Manet

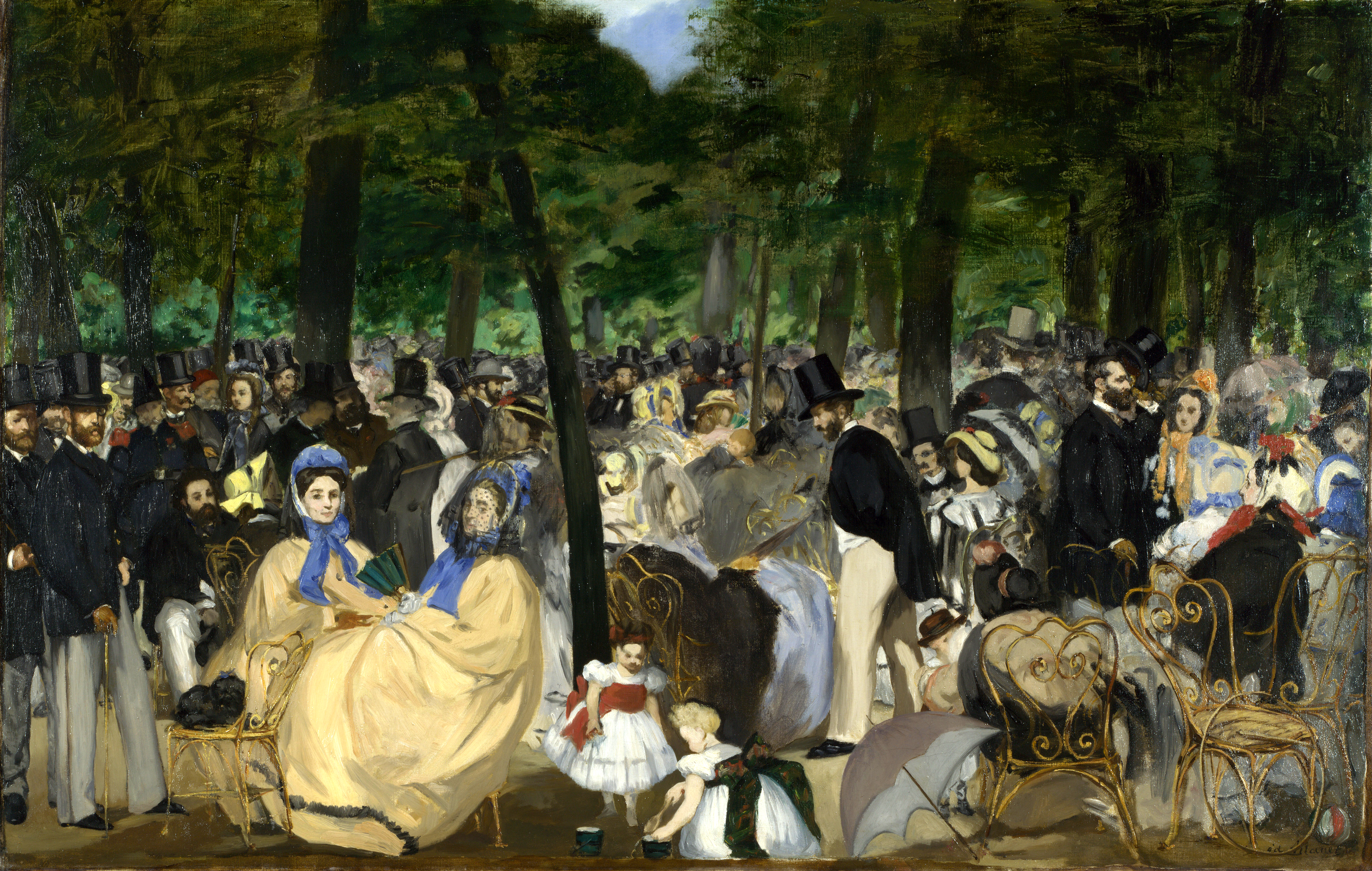
- Artist: Édouard Manet
- Year: 1862
- Medium: Oil on canvas
- Dimensions: 76 cm × 118 cm (30 in × 46 in)
- Location: Hugh Lane Gallery; Dublin

Music in the Tuileries is an 1862 (Note: Art historian Pierre Courthion dates the painting to c. 1860, citing Manet's contemporary biographer Adolphe Tabarant. Tabarant states that the painting's visible "1862", which is in a different color, was added later. Courthion, Pierre (1984). Manet. New York: Harry N. Abrams. p. 50. ISBN 0-8109-1318-6.) oil-on-canvas painting by Édouard Manet. It is owned by the National Gallery, London and the Hugh Lane Gallery, Dublin as part of the shared Lane Bequest.

The work is an early example of Manet's painterly style, inspired by Frans Hals and Diego Velázquez, and it is a harbinger of his lifelong interest in the subject of leisure. The painting influenced Manet's contemporaries – such as Monet, Renoir and Bazille – to paint similar large groups of people.

The painting depicts the gatherings of Parisians at weekly concerts in the Tuileries gardens near the Louvre, although no musicians are depicted. While the picture was regarded as unfinished by some, the suggested atmosphere imparts a sense of what the Tuileries gardens were like at the time; one may imagine the music and conversation.

The iron chairs in the foreground had just replaced the wooden chairs in the garden in 1862. Manet has included several of his friends, artists, authors, and musicians who take part, and a self-portrait. Manet is depicted on the far left; next to him is another painter Albert de Balleroy. To their right, seated, is sculptor and critic Zacharie Astruc. Manet's brother Eugène Manet is in foreground, right of centre, with white trousers; the composer Jacques Offenbach with glasses and moustache sits against a tree to the right; critic Théophile Gautier stands against a tree in brown suit and full beard, while author Charles Baudelaire is to the left of Gautier. Henri Fantin-Latour is further left, with beard, looking at the viewer. The fair-haired child in the centre is Léon Leenhoff. It has been noted that several of those depicted were prominent French Wagnerians, and speculated that the music being played might be by Wagner himself.

The work measures 76.2 × 118.1 centimetres (30.0 × 46.5 in). It was first exhibited in 1863, and Manet sold the painting to opera singer and collector Jean-Baptiste Faure in January of 1883, shortly before Manet's death. It was sold on to dealer Paul Durand-Ruel in 1898, and then to collector Sir Hugh Lane in 1903. After Lane's death, when RMS Lusitania was sunk in 1915, an unwitnessed codicil to his will left the painting to the Dublin City Gallery (now known as The Hugh Lane). The codicil was found to be invalid, and in 1917 a court case decided that his previous will left the work to the National Gallery in London. After intervention from the Irish government, the two galleries reached a compromise in 1959, agreeing to share the paintings, with half of the Lane Bequest lent and shown in Dublin every five years. The agreement was varied in 1993 so that 31 of the 39 paintings would stay in Ireland, and four of the remaining eight would be lent to Dublin for six years at a time.

== Painting materials ==
The colors in greater areas of this painting are generally subdued and executed in ochres or in mixtures of several pigments. The dark green foliage in the upper part contains a glaze of emerald green and Scheele's green mixed with yellow lake with small addition of ivory black and yellow ochre. The strong colourful accents in the bonnets and clothes of the children are painted in almost pure pigments such as cobalt blue, vermilion or chrome orange.

== Reception ==
Music in the Tuileries received substantial critical and public attention, most of it negative. In the words of one Manet biographer, "it is difficult for us to imagine the kind of fury Music in the Tuileries provoked when it was exhibited". By portraying Manet's social circle instead of classical heroes, historical icons, or gods, the painting could be interpreted as challenging the value of those subjects or as an attempt to elevate his contemporaries to the same level. The public, accustomed to the finely detailed brushwork of historical painters such as Ernest Meissonier, thought Manet's thick brushstrokes looked crude and unfinished. Angered by the subject matter and technique, several visitors even threatened to destroy the painting. One of Manet's idols, Eugène Delacroix, was of the painting's few defenders.

== See also ==
- List of paintings by Édouard Manet
- 1862 in art

== Bibliography ==
- Brombert, Beth Archer (1996). Édouard Manet: Rebel in a Frock Coat. ISBN 0316109479.
- King, Ross (2006). The Judgment of Paris: The Revolutionary Decade that Gave the World Impressionism. New York: Waller & Company. ISBN 0802714668.
