= Summer's Day =

Painting by Berthe Morisot

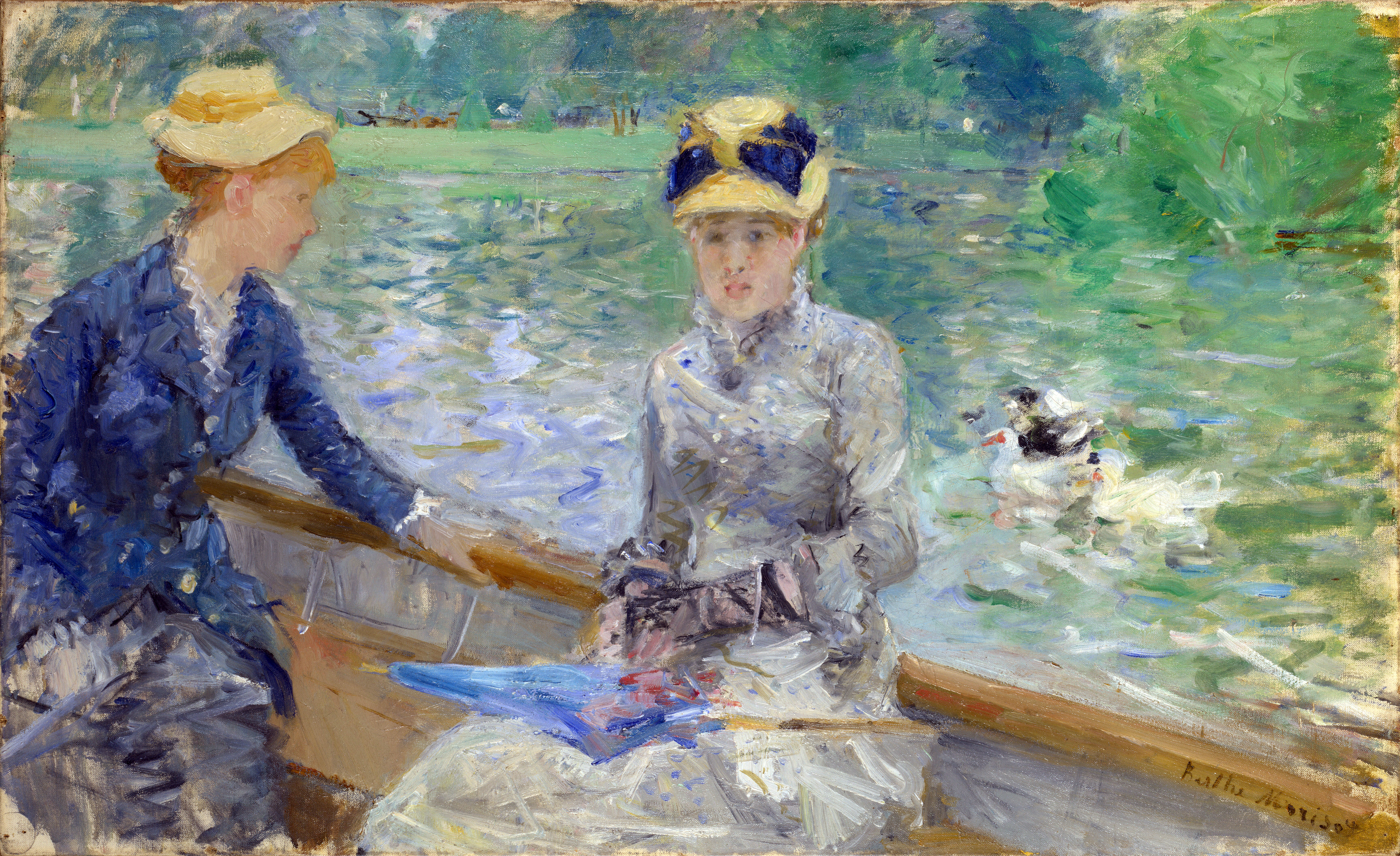
- Artist: Berthe Morisot
- Year: 1879
- Medium: Oil on canvas
- Dimensions: 45.7 cm × 75.2 cm (18.0 in × 29.6 in)
- Location: National Gallery, London

Summer's Day (French: Jour d'eté) is an oil-on-canvas painting by the French Impressionist painter Berthe Morisot, created in 1879. The painting depicts two women seated in a row boat, and was painted in the Bois de Boulogne. It is held at the National Gallery, in London.

== History ==
During the winter of 1878–1879, Morisot had her first child, Julie. The following summer, she walked every day with Julie and her nurse in the Bois de Boulogne. After a long period spent indoors, it gave her the wish to start painting outdoors again. However, she did not want to leave her child alone with her nanny for long periods of time. Finally, she found a balance between her maternal duty and her wish to resume her painting, by bringing her models to the park, so she could work there and be with Julie at the same time.

Morisot exhibited Summer's Day during the Fifth Great Impressionist Exhibition, in 1880, along with several other works she produced during the summer of 1879. In fact, for the first time, her paintings were received with plenty of enthusiasm and critics particularly praised her subtle use of color.

== Description ==
The painting shows a sunny scene by the water, with two young women in a rowing boat. The venue is the Bois de Boulogne, where Parisians used to escape from their bustling city. Two fashionably dressed women have boarded a boat for a trip. Morisot suggests a fleeting impression and reinforces this idea with small details, such as the carriage with its horses speeding past in the background.

Morisot gives a spontaneous image of the two women waiting for the boat to be pushed from shore. However, this spontaneity can be described as relative. Her composition is extremely well thought out, as evidenced, among other things, by a watercolor study for this painting, in which she replicates the motif almost identically. The women depicted are not accidental extras either, but professional models. The two women also posed for Édouard Manet and were painted once again by Morisot later that summer, also in the Bois de Boulogne, while picking flowers.

The composition, very studied, is based on three planes: in the foreground, the two young women, with the young woman in the light dress being in the center of the painting; the second plane is occupied by water and ducks, and the third plane features the grove of trees in the background.

Morisot painted Summer's Day in her typical Impressionist style. She applies large amounts of paint using very flexible brush strokes, so that the finished work has fine lines and spots as well as thick spots. The result is an irregular texture of paint, which deviates completely from the smooth structure prescribed by the art academy of the time. With energetic brushstrokes that fly in all directions, Morisot follows what the light tells her.

As in almost all her works, Morisot places particular emphasis on the feminine aspect, notably through the choice of motifs and a sensitive representation. The two women occupy the entire foreground, in the boat where they are seated. Visually, Morisot is very close to them and clearly focuses on the psychology of the characters.

Morisot employed a rather unusual palette in this painting. She painted the dark blue coat of the woman on the left with cerulean blue, a pigment made from costly metals like cobalt and tin, which was among the most expensive used by artists and became popular among landscape painters and Impressionists after Pierre-Auguste Renoir's La Parisienne. The green foliage is painted in a mixture of emerald green, viridian, lead white and cadmium yellow. Cadmium yellow was not yet widely used at this time.

== Ownership ==
Ownership of the painting, part of the disputed Lane Bequest, has been shared since 1959 between the National Gallery in London and the Hugh Lane Gallery in Dublin. The painting has been in the National Gallery since 1917. The ownership dispute between the National Gallery and the Dublin gallery was due to be resolved in 2019.

== Theft ==
On 12 April 1956, the painting was stolen from the Tate Gallery in London, by two Irish students, Paul Hogan and Billy Fogarty, while it was on display there. They stole it in order to highlight Ireland's claim to the Hugh Lane Bequest. It was later recovered after being left anonymously at the Irish Embassy.

== See also ==
- List of stolen paintings
