= The Umbrellas (Renoir) =

19th-century painting by Pierre-Auguste Renoir

- Les Parapluies (French)
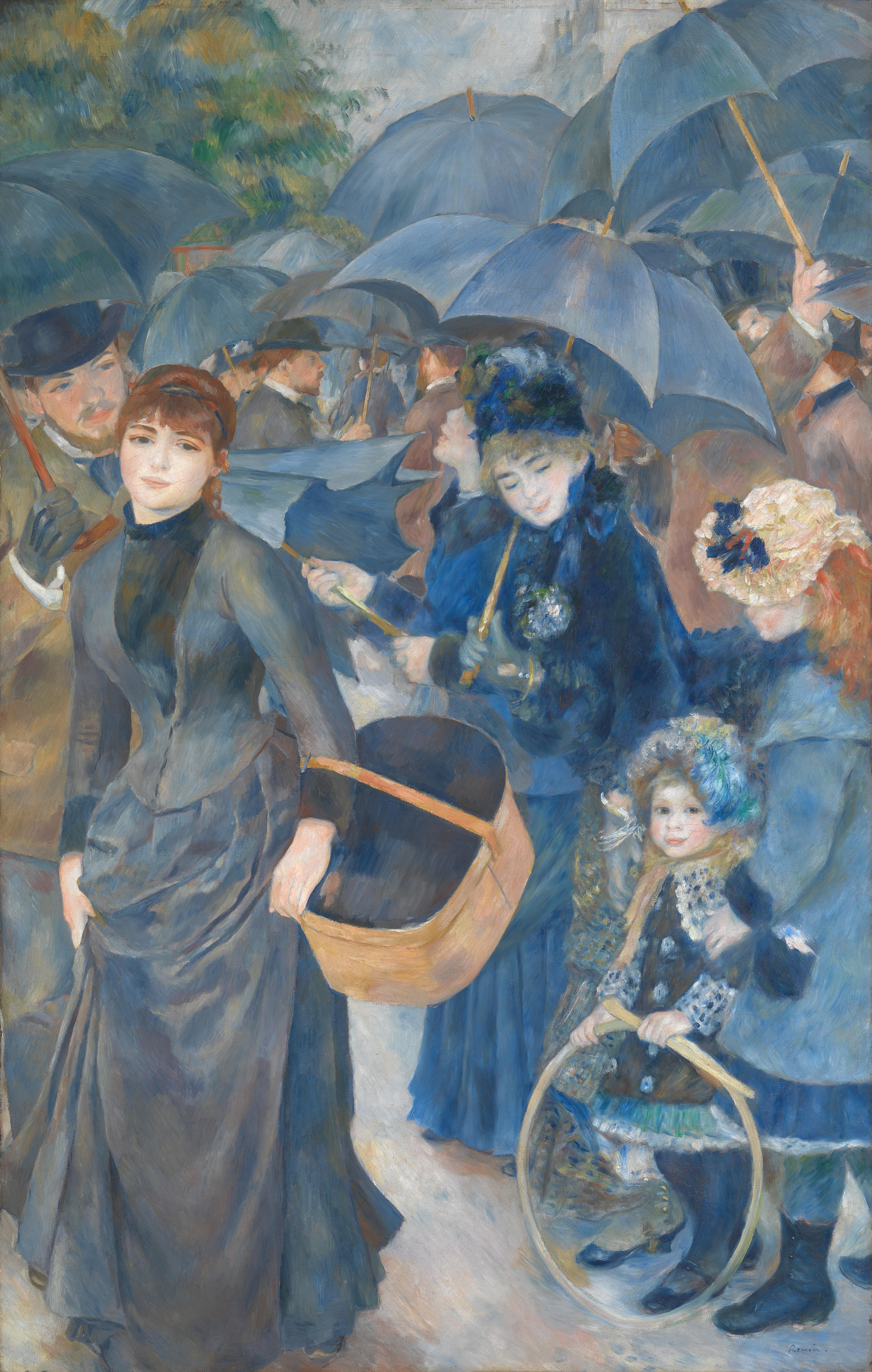
- Artist: Pierre-Auguste Renoir
- Year: c. 1880–86
- Type: Oil
- Medium: Canvas
- Dimensions: 180.3 cm × 114.9 cm (71.0 in × 45.2 in)
- Location: National Gallery and Hugh Lane Gallery; London and Dublin

The Umbrellas is an oil-on-canvas painting by Pierre-Auguste Renoir, painted in two phases in the 1880s. It is owned by the National Gallery in London as part of the Lane Bequest but is displayed alternately in London and at the Dublin City Gallery The Hugh Lane. From May 2013 to 2019, it returned to Dublin for a six-year period. It is now in the National Gallery London.

Currently, the painting is on loan to the Musee d'Orsay in Paris for their Renoir retrospective Renoir et l'amour: La modernité heureuse (1865-1885) From March 17 to July 19, 2026

== Development ==
Renoir began the painting in about 1880–81, using the loose brushwork with dark and bright tones typical of the Impressionist movement. In about 1885, after losing his attachment to Impressionism and drawing inspiration from classical art he had seen in Italy and the works of Ingres and Cézanne, he reworked parts of the painting, particularly the principal female figure to the left of the frame, in a more classical linear style using more muted colours, and added the background and the umbrellas themselves. X-ray photography has shown that the clothing of the female figure was originally different: she wore a hat and her dress had horizontal rows of frills, with white lace at its cuffs and collar, suggesting that she was middle class, whereas the simpler clothes in the revised painting mark her out as a member of the working class, a grisette not a bourgeoise. The x-ray analysis and then the changing fashions allow the periods of work to be dated with reasonable accuracy.

== Description ==
The painting measures 180.3 centimetres (71.0 in) high by 114.9 centimetres (45.2 in) wide. It depicts a busy street scene in Paris, with most of the people depicted using umbrellas against the rain. To the right, a mother looks down at her daughters, each fashionably dressed in the styles of 1881 for the afternoon promenade. She largely conceals a female figure at the centre of the frame, caught in the act of raising or lowering her umbrella, suggesting that the rain is about to start or stop. The principal female figure to the left of the frame, a milliner's assistant or modiste modelled by Renoir's lover and frequent subject Suzanne Valadon, holds up her skirt against the mud and water on the road as she carries a hatbox, but has no hat, raincoat or umbrella.

A vigorous young bearded gentleman seems to be about to engage her, perhaps to offer her shelter under his umbrella. She, and one of the two girls to the right with a hoop and stick, look out at the viewer, while most of the other people go about their business. Unconventionally, the focus of the painting is not at its centre, and many of the figures are cut off by the frame as if the painting were a photograph. The composition appears natural, but the angles of the umbrellas are carefully arranged to form geometric shapes, with the main figure's bandbox and the girl's hoop adding rounded elements. The colours are largely blues and greys: a pattern of umbrella canopies across the top of the painting, and the dresses and coats of the people lower down.

== Material analysis ==
The pigment analysis of Renoir's The Umbrellas conducted by the scientists at the National Gallery in London confirmed the assumption that it was painted in two distinct stages as mentioned above. In the dress of the woman on the left two layers have been identified: the lower layer contains cobalt blue mixed with zinc yellow and red lake. This is a similar pigment mixture as used for the woman on the right and her two daughters. Both layers have been painted during the first phase in 1881. The upper layer of the dress of the woman on the right painted during the second stage in 1886 contains a mixture of ultramarine with other pigments with a distinctly less vivid grayish-blue color.

== Provenance ==
Renoir did not exhibit The Umbrellas straight away – he may have thought the combination of styles would be too challenging for the public – and he eventually sold the painting to the French art dealer Paul Durand-Ruel in 1892. He sold it to Sir Hugh Lane, who died in the sinking of the RMS Lusitania in 1915 and left this and other paintings to the Tate Gallery in London in his will. It came into the possession of the gallery in 1917 (although a signed codicil suggested that Lane had changed his mind before his death, and would have preferred the paintings to be displayed in Dublin. The codicil however was not countersigned and therefore contested as having not been witnessed). It was transferred to the National Gallery in 1935, but an agreement was reached in 1959 to alternate its display (with seven other paintings from the Lane Bequest) between London and Dublin. Exceptionally, it was loaned for an exhibition at the Frick Collection in New York in 2013.

== See also ==
- List of paintings by Pierre-Auguste Renoir
