= Portrait of a Man in a Red Cap =

Painting by Titian

Man in a Red Cap
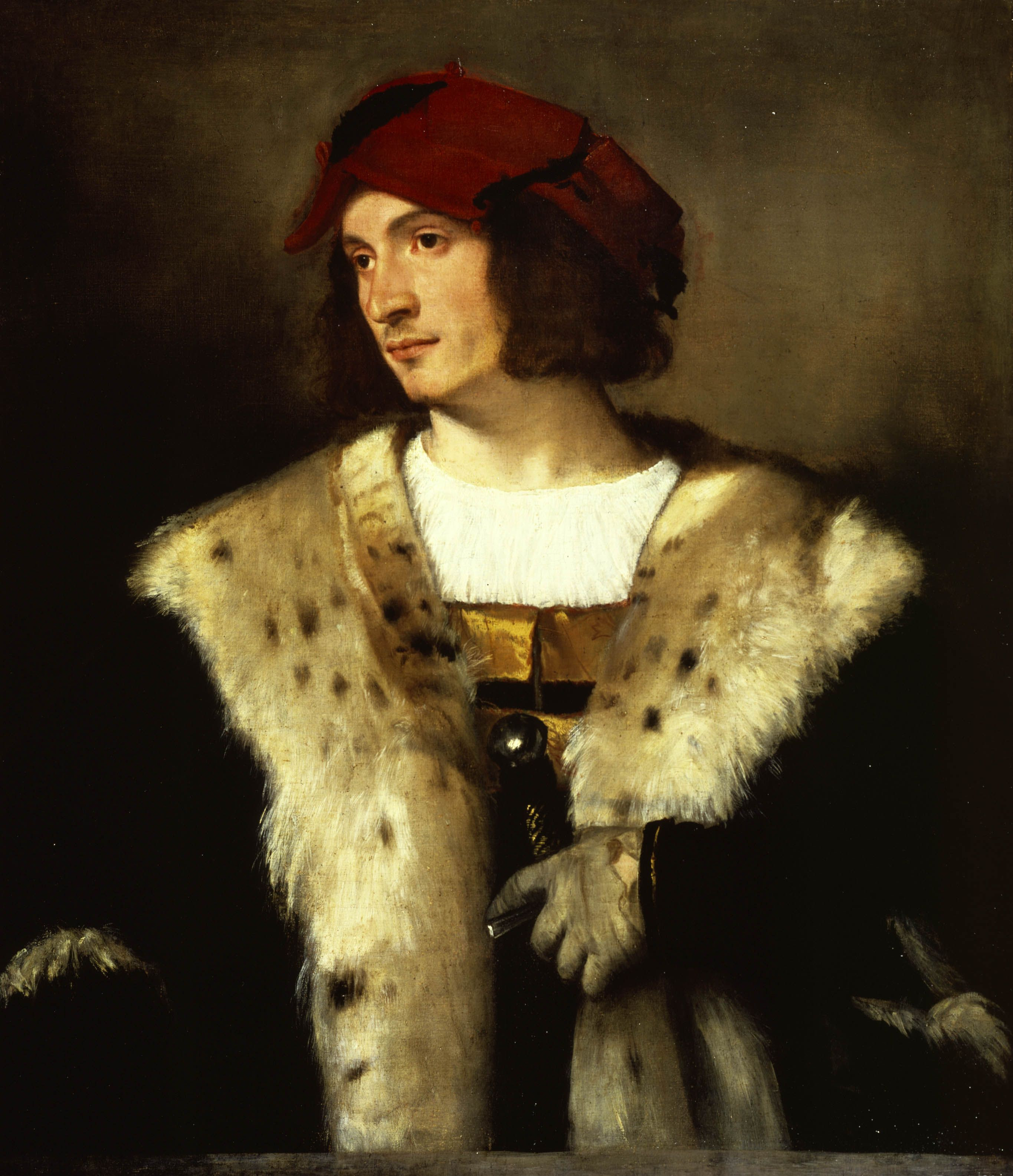
- Artist: Titian
- Year: c. 1510–1516
- Medium: Oil on canvas
- Dimensions: 82.2 cm × 71.1 cm (32.4 in × 28.0 in)
- Location: Frick Collection, New York

Portrait of a Man in a Red Cap, also known as Man with a Red Cap and Portrait of a Young Man, is an early-sixteenth-century portrait by the Venetian painter Titian, generally dated to about 1516.

The unidentified sitter is depicted wearing a vivid red cap, the feature from which the painting takes its customary title. The work belongs to the group of portraits produced shortly after his period in Padua, and is now held by the Frick Collection in New York City.

== Date ==
Two portraits of young men have been ascribed to the years immediately following Titian's stay at Padua (c. 1513–1515): the Man with a Red Cap and the Man with a Glove. The Frick Collection dates the former painting slightly later, to about 1516.

== Provenance ==
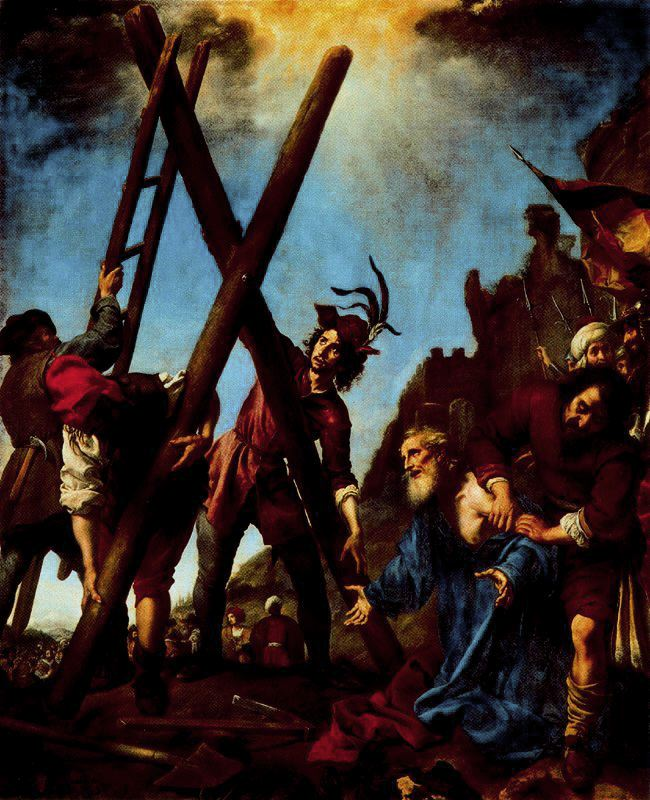
Carlo Dolci, The Crucifixion of Saint Andrew (1646)

Although the sitter has not been identified, the portrait was apparently well known by the seventeenth century. Carlo Dolci incorporated a copy of the figure into the background of his Martyrdom of Saint Andrew in the Palazzo Pitti, Florence. The inclusion of the figure indicates the portrait's continued recognition during Dolci's lifetime.

The art critic Charles Ricketts, writing in 1910, recalled the painting's rediscovery:

It passed through Messrs. Christies' some time ago in a darkened and dirty condition. I then imagined this beautiful Giorgionesque work to be an early work of Francesco Vecellio, basing my impression on the colour and on the evidence of Francesco's knowledge of Titian's methods. The picture has since been cleaned. When I saw it again the scales fell from my eyes, to use a consecrated expression. How was it possible that I could have mistaken this masterpiece for the work of a second-rate man? How was it that the shape of the eyelids, the construction of the chin and the shape of the shadows had escaped me? The brown background had become a luminous warm grey, the glove and fur, which I had thought indifferent, revealed the tender pigment of the master; the painting of the linen in pâte sur pâte was a practice of Titian's. The work stood out, not as a mere interesting problem like the 'Head' at Frankfort, but a masterpiece superior in preservation to the Cobham 'Ariosto,' contemporary with, or slightly later than, the beautiful portrait at Temple Newsam.

The painting passed through several private collections before being auctioned by Christie's in 1906 and purchased by Sir Hugh Lane. Henry Clay Frick acquired it in 1915.

== See also ==
- List of works by Titian
