= Hugh Lane =

Irish art dealer and collector

Sir Hugh Lane
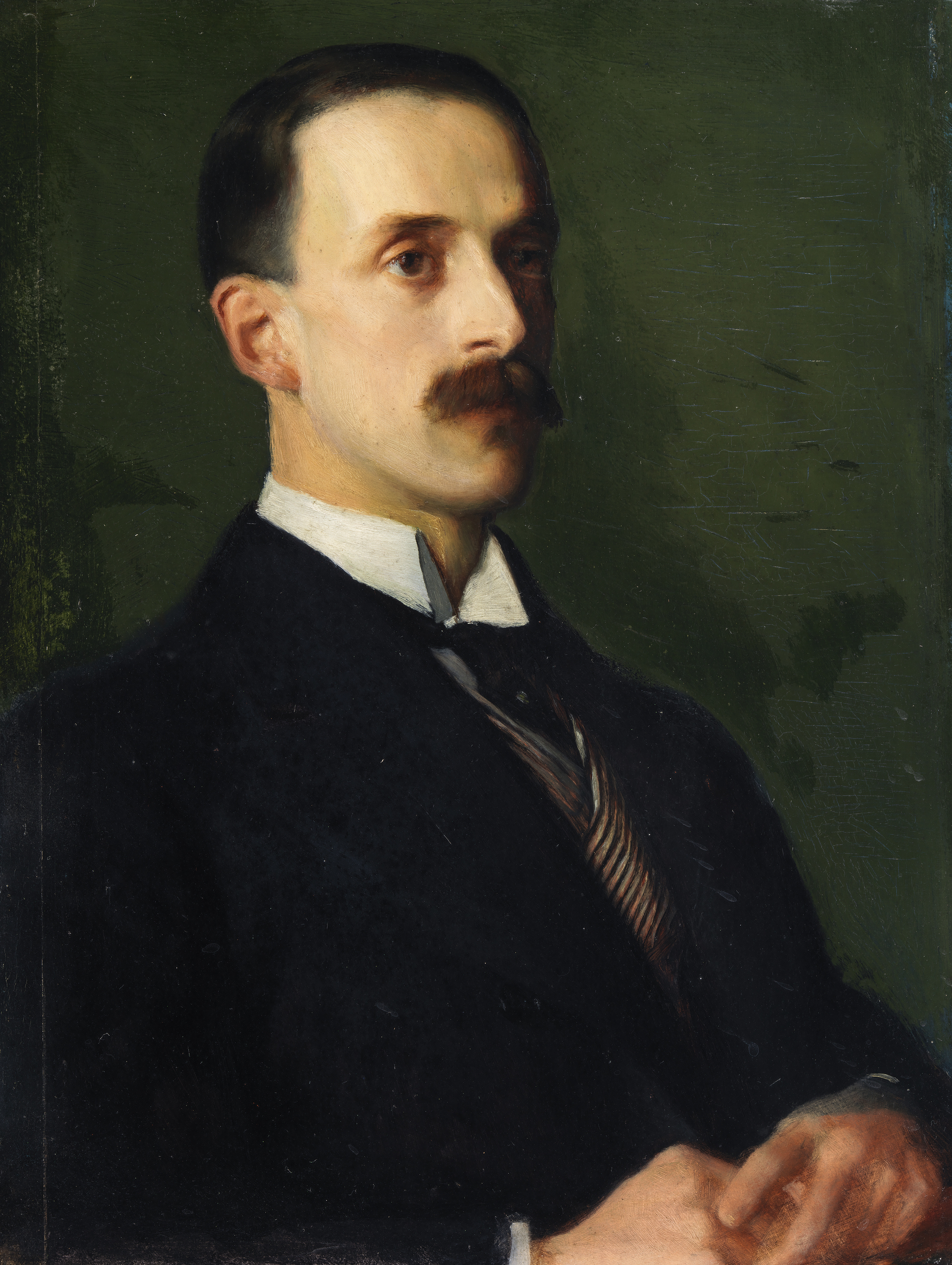
- Born: 9 November 1875; County Cork, Ireland,
- Died: 7 May 1915 (aged 39); RMS Lusitania, Atlantic Ocean
- Occupation: Art dealer
- Relatives: Augusta, Lady Gregory (aunt)

Sir Hugh Percy Lane (9 November 1875 – 7 May 1915) was an Irish art dealer, collector and gallery director. He is best known for establishing Dublin's Municipal Gallery of Modern Art (the first known public gallery of modern art in the world) and for his contribution to the visual arts in Ireland, including the Lane Bequest. Hugh Lane died on board the RMS Lusitania.

== Family ==
Hugh Percy Lane was born in County Cork, Ireland, on 9 November 1875. He was the son of a rector father, James William Lane. His mother, Frances Adelaide (Persse) Lane, was a daughter of Dudley Persse, of Roxborough, County Galway. Her sister, Augusta, was the dramatist Augusta, Lady Gregory, of Coole, County Galway.

He was brought up in Cornwall, England, and began his career as an apprentice painting restorer with Martin Henry Colnaghi in London, then worked as an art dealer at the Colnaghi's Marlborough Gallery for some years, before becoming a dealer in his own right and opening a gallery in Dublin in 1908.

Through regular visits to Coole (near Gort), County Galway, the home of his aunt, Lady Gregory, Lane remained in contact with Ireland. He soon counted among his family, friends and social circle those who collectively formed the core of the Irish cultural renaissance in the early decades of the 20th century that was a part of the Celtic Revival.

== Art collector ==
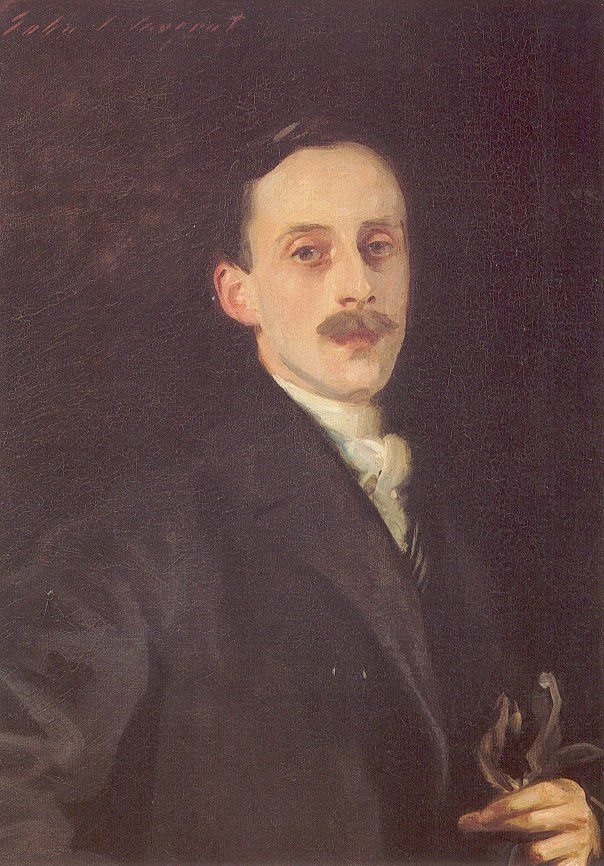
Sir Hugh Lane by John Singer Sargent, 1906

Extolling the cause of Irish art abroad, Lane also became one of the foremost collectors and dealers of French Impressionist paintings in Europe, and amongst those works purchased by him for the new gallery were La Musique aux Tuileries by Manet, Sur la Plage by Degas, Les Parapluies by Renoir and La Cheminée by Vuillard. For his "services to art" in Ireland, Lane was knighted in June 1909 at the comparatively young age of 33.

The Municipal Gallery of Modern Art opened in January 1908 in temporary premises at 17 Harcourt Street, Dublin, with no entrance charge. Lane hoped that Dublin Corporation would run it, but the corporation was unsure if it would be financially viable. Lane met the running costs while seeking a more permanent home. A new gallery was proposed in St Stephens Green, and then a dramatic bridge-gallery over the River Liffey, both designed by Sir Edwin Lutyens. Both were turned down, the latter by a close vote of the corporation, which would have to meet the long-term running costs. Despairing of Irish support, after all he had done, in 1913 Sir Hugh bequeathed his pictures to the National Gallery in London. Shortly before his death, Lane reversed this in a codicil to his will, which was, however, not witnessed.

Lane did not live to see his gallery permanently located as he died in 1915 in the sinking of the RMS Lusitania, off the coast of County Cork. In March 1914, fourteen months before his death, Lane had been appointed Director of the National Gallery of Ireland. He was succeeded by Walter G. Strickland, who was the Gallery's registrar.

The Municipal Gallery of Modern Art, extended in 2005, is now in Parnell Square, central Dublin.

A drama-documentary on him, Citizen Lane, directed by Thaddeus O'Sullivan, was produced in 2018.

== Controversy over the Lane Bequest ==
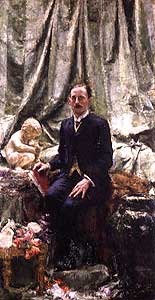
Portrait by Antonio Mancini, 1913

Following his death, Lane's will bequeathed his collection to London, but an unwitnessed later codicil bequeathed it to Dublin. Having possession, London's National Gallery did not recognise the codicil. Altering this legal reality became the life's work of Professor Thomas Bodkin. At the request of Lane's aunt, Lady Gregory, the leader of the Irish Government W.T. Cosgrave unsuccessfully approached Ramsay MacDonald on the matter in 1929.

Then, in 1938, the present-day solution came from the British side, during the House of Lords debates on the Eire (Confirmation of Agreements) Act 1938. Lord Strabolgi put forward a suggestion from Sir Robert Witt: "..that these pictures should alternate between London and Dublin. We have had them in London for a considerable number of years, and it might now be the turn of the Dublin Galleries to have them for a number of years... Legally, the holders have a very strong case, but we are so wealthy in our treasures, while Ireland is so comparatively poor..."

Lord Marley added: "My Lords, perhaps I might say one word in support of what my noble friend Lord Strabolgi has said because Sir Hugh Lane was a cousin of mine, and I do know he was very anxious, even before this codicil was made, that the pictures should go to Dublin. I hope that something will be done in support of what my noble friend has said."

When John A. Costello became Taoiseach in 1948, he initiated further negotiations with the UK government. Support in London was maintained in 1953 by Lord Moyne, who said in Parliament: ".. I would urge on Her Majesty's Government to include in it a provision for the return of the thirty-six, or so, pictures which were collected by the late Sir Hugh Lane as a basis for a modern collection for Ireland ...."

These interventions eventually led on to a compromise agreement in 1959, announced by Taoiseach Seán Lemass, whereby half of the Lane Bequest would be lent and shown in Dublin every five years. In his announcement of the agreement, Lemass thanked the then-retired Thomas Bodkin for his persistence, helped by Lord Moyne and Lord Pakenham. In 1993, the agreement was changed so that 31 of the 39 paintings would stay in Ireland. The remaining 8 were divided into 2 groups so that 4 would be lent for 6 years at a time to Dublin. These 8 include works by Manet, Monet, Pissarro, Renoir, Morisot, Vuillard and Degas. In 2008, the National Gallery in London arranged for the entire collection to be on display in Dublin together for the first time. There was a switch in May 2013 for a six-year period.

== Bibliography ==
- O'Byrne, Robert (2000). Hugh Lane 1875–1915. Dublin: Lilliput. ISBN 1-901866-55-6.
