= Hugh Lane Gallery =

Dublin City Gallery The Hugh Lane
- Dánlann Chathair Bhaile Átha Cliath
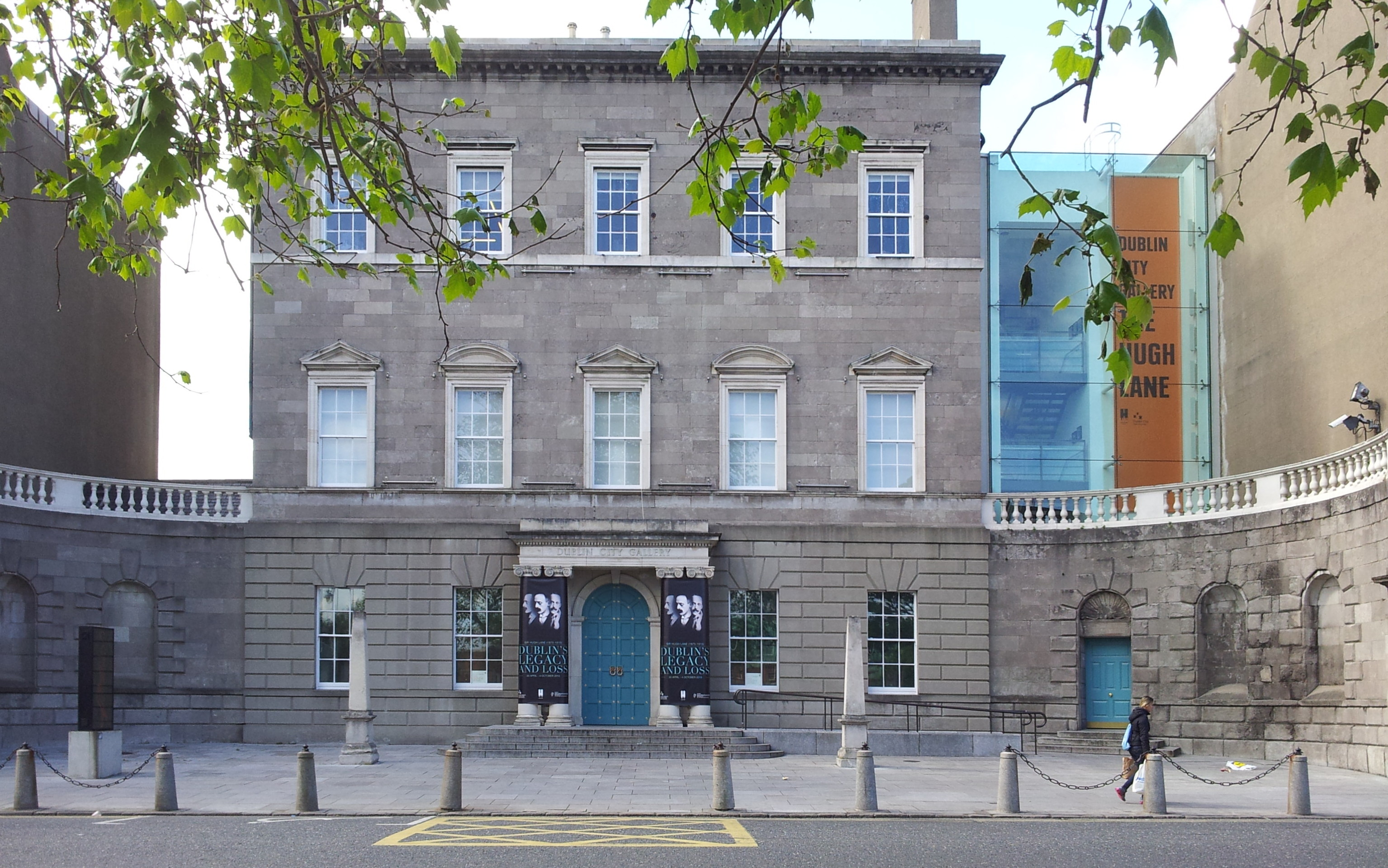
- Hugh Lane Gallery in 2015

- Location within Central Dublin
- Former name: Municipal Gallery of Modern Art
- Established: 1908
- Location: Charlemont House, Parnell Square North, Dublin
- Coordinates: 53.354167°N 6.264722°W
- Type: art gallery
- Founder: Hugh Lane
- Director: Barbara Dawson
- Chairperson: Pat Molloy
- Public transit access: Parnell Luas stop (Green Line)
- Website: hughlane.ie

The Hugh Lane Gallery, and originally the Municipal Gallery of Modern Art, is an art museum operated by Dublin City Council and its wholly owned company, the Hugh Lane Gallery Trust. It is in Charlemont House (built 1763) on Parnell Square, Dublin, Ireland. Admission is free. The gallery closed September 28, 2025 for major refurbishment.

== History ==
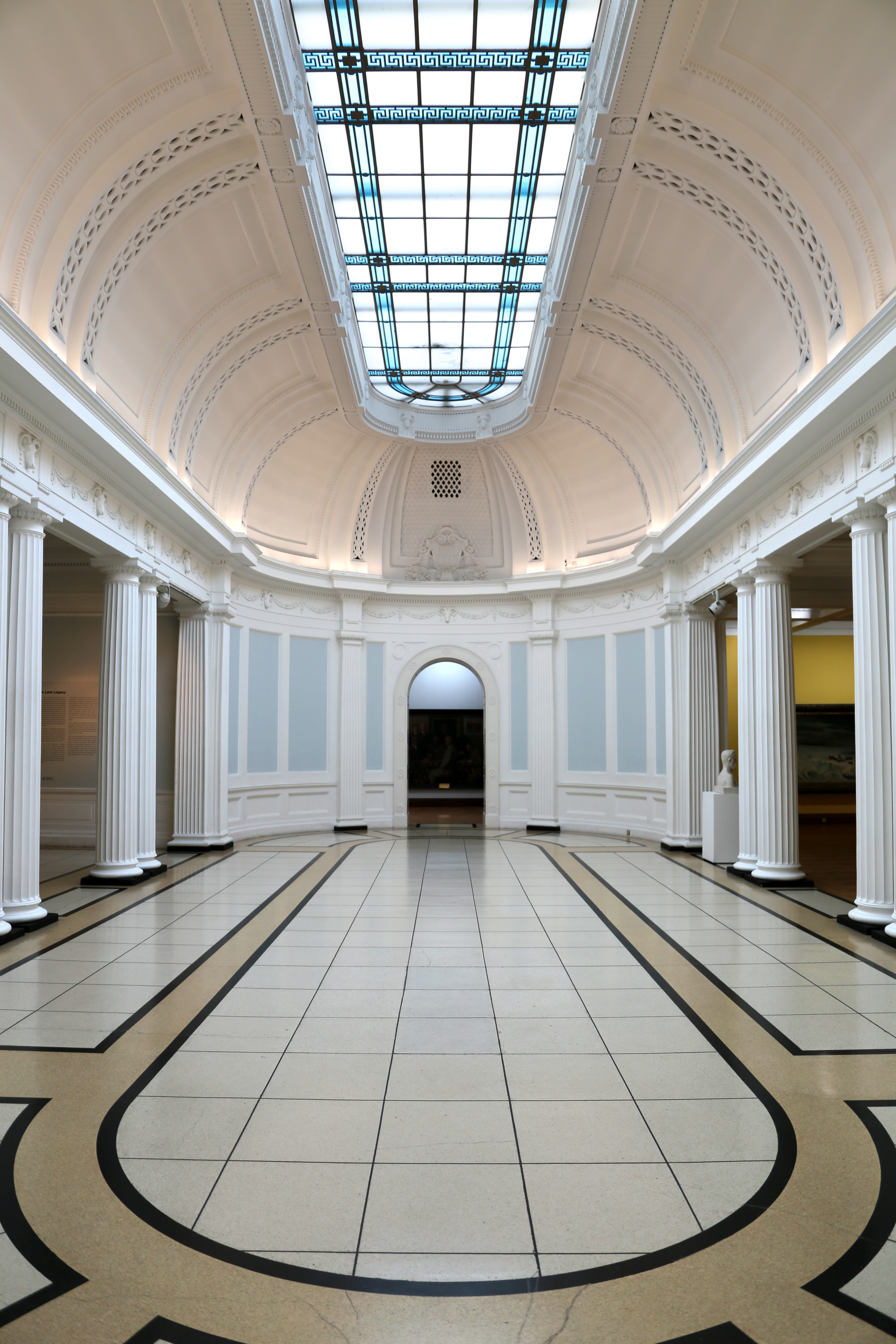
The Oval Hall

The gallery was founded by noted art collector Sir Hugh Lane on Harcourt Street on 20 January 1908, and is the first known public gallery of modern art in the world. Lane met the running costs, while seeking a more permanent home. New buildings were proposed in St. Stephens Green, and as a dramatic bridge-gallery over the River Liffey, both proposed designs by Sir Edwin Lutyens, both unrealised. Lane did not live to see his gallery permanently located as he died in 1915 during the sinking of the RMS Lusitania. Since 1933 it has been housed in Charlemont House.

Lane's will bequeathed his collection to London, but an unwitnessed codicil, written in the months prior to his death, bequeathed the 39 paintings to Dublin on the condition that a permanent gallery was secured within 5 years. London's National Gallery did not recognise the codicil, and all the paintings form the Lane Bequest in their collection. In 1938, the British put forward a suggestion from Sir Robert Witt: "...that these pictures should alternate between London and Dublin. We have had them in London for a considerable number of years, and it might now be the turn of the Dublin Galleries to have them for a number of years... Legally, the holders have a very strong case, but we are so wealthy in our treasures, while Ireland is so comparatively poor..."

This eventually led to a compromise agreement in 1959, announced by Taoiseach Seán Lemass, whereby half of the Lane Bequest would be lent and shown in Dublin every five years. In 1993, the agreement was changed so that 31 of the 39 paintings would stay in Ireland. The remaining 8 were divided into 2 groups, so that 4 would be lent for 6 years at a time to Dublin. These 8 include works by Manet, Monet, Pissarro, Renoir, Morisot, Vuillard and Degas. In 2008, the National Gallery in London arranged for the entire collection to be on display in Dublin together for the first time. There was a switch in May 2013 for a six-year period.

== Building ==
Charlemont House is a mansion in Dublin, Ireland. The house was built in 1763 and designed by William Chambers for James Caulfeild, 1st Earl of Charlemont. It is a brick-fronted mansion on Dublin's Parnell Square. According to the Hugh Lane Gallery, "in 1929 the gardens of the house were built upon to accommodate the Gallery". It was opened as a museum in 1933. The gallery was closed for reconstruction in 2004, and reopened in May 2006, with a new extension by Gilroy McMahon Architects. The gallery is completely wheelchair-accessible.

== Collection ==
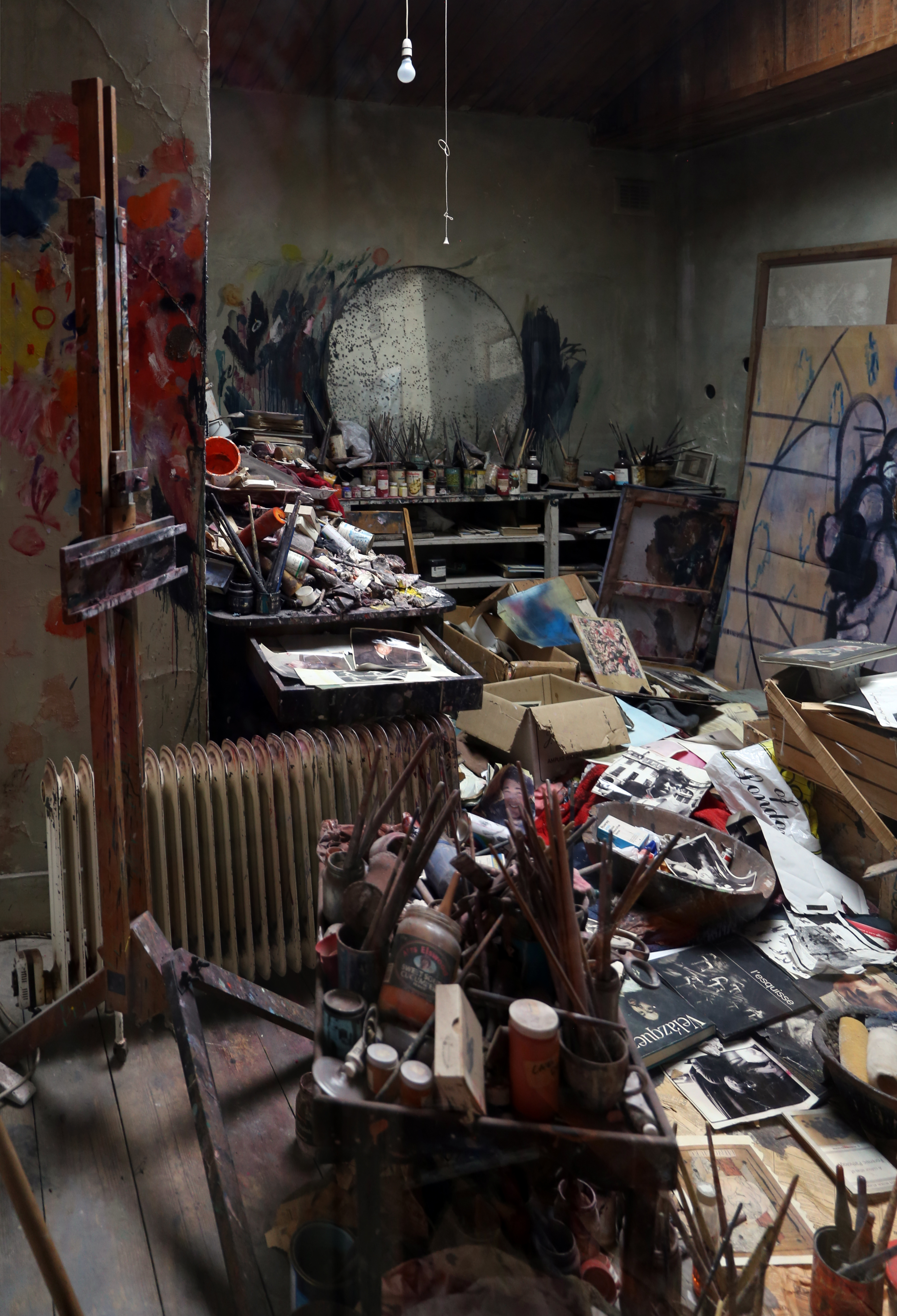
Reconstruction of the Francis Bacon Studio at the Hugh Lane Gallery

The museum has a permanent collection and hosts exhibitions, mostly by contemporary Irish artists. It has a dedicated Sean Scully room. Irish artist, Francis Bacon's studio was reconstructed in the gallery in 2001 after being dismantled and moved from London starting in 1998.

The Hugh Lane is notable for its collection of French art, the Lane Bequest pictures including works such as The Umbrellas (Les Parapluies) by Auguste Renoir; Portrait of Eva Gonzalès by Édouard Manet, Édouard Manet's Music in the Tuileries, Summer's Day by Berthe Morisot and View of Louveciennes by Camille Pissarro.

There is a permanent display of stained glass at the museum which features The Eve of St. Agnes by Irish artist and illustrator Harry Clarke. As well as a previously banned, "scandalous" work of his, which was purchased in 2015 for £35,000.

In June 1992, the painting In The Omnibus by French artist Honoré Daumier was stolen. The theft took place in the afternoon during the hours when the gallery was open to the public. The Criminal Assets Bureau (CAB) recovered the painting during an investigation in 2013, more than 20 years later. Director Barbara Dawson expressed her delight that the painting had been found. She said, "It was such a shock when it was stolen and we had messages of sympathy from galleries and museums in Ireland and around the world."

== Selected past exhibitions ==
Offside was a 2005 project in The Hugh Lane curated by Pallas Projects and included works by Albano Afonso, Antistrot, Anna Boyle, Rhona Byrne, Mark Cullen, Brian Duggan, John Dummet, Brendan Earley, Andreas Gefeller, Niamh McCann, Alex McCullagh, Nina McGowan, Nathaniel Mellors, Clive Murphy, Adriette Myburgh, Cris Neumann, Paul O’Neill, Garrett Phelan, Abigail Reynolds, Mark Titchner, Rich Streitmatter-Tran.

The Golden Bough was a series of exhibitions curated by Michael Dempsey in 2010. It included solo shows by Ronnie Hughes, Corban Walker and Niamh McCann.

Sleepwalkers (2012–15) curated by Michael Dempsey and Logan Sisley was a two-year project in which six artists (Clodagh Emoe, Lee Welch, Sean Lynch, Linda Quinlan, Jim Ricks, and Gavin Murphy) were invited to use the museum's resources, reveal their artistic process, and to collaborate with each other in this "unusual experiment in exhibition production". This process culminated in each artist developing a solo exhibition at the Hugh Lane and a publication.

Kennedy Browne, consisting of Gareth Kennedy and Sarah Browne, exhibited 3 films as the Redaction Trilogy, 2019–20.

The largest Andy Warhol show to ever come to Ireland opened in October 2023 at The Hugh Lane. Tilted Andy Warhol Three Times Out, it is the first Warhol exhibit in the country in 25 years.

== Bibliography ==
- Dawson, Barbara (2008). Hugh Lane : founder of a gallery of modern art for Ireland. London: Scala. ISBN 978-1-85759-575-8. OCLC 298595691.
- Cross, Dorothy; Duggan, Brian; Holten, Katie; Phelan, Garrett; Walker, Corban; Weir, Grace (2011). The golden bough : Dublin City Gallery The Hugh Lane. Dublin: Dublin City Gallery The Hugh Lane. ISBN 978-1-901702-38-5. OCLC 1008432727.
- Dempsey, Michael; Sisley, Logan (2015). Sleepwalkers. London: Hugh Lane Municipal Gallery of Modern Art. ISBN 978-1-905464-98-2. OCLC 894611255.
