= Bergen Assembly 2019 =

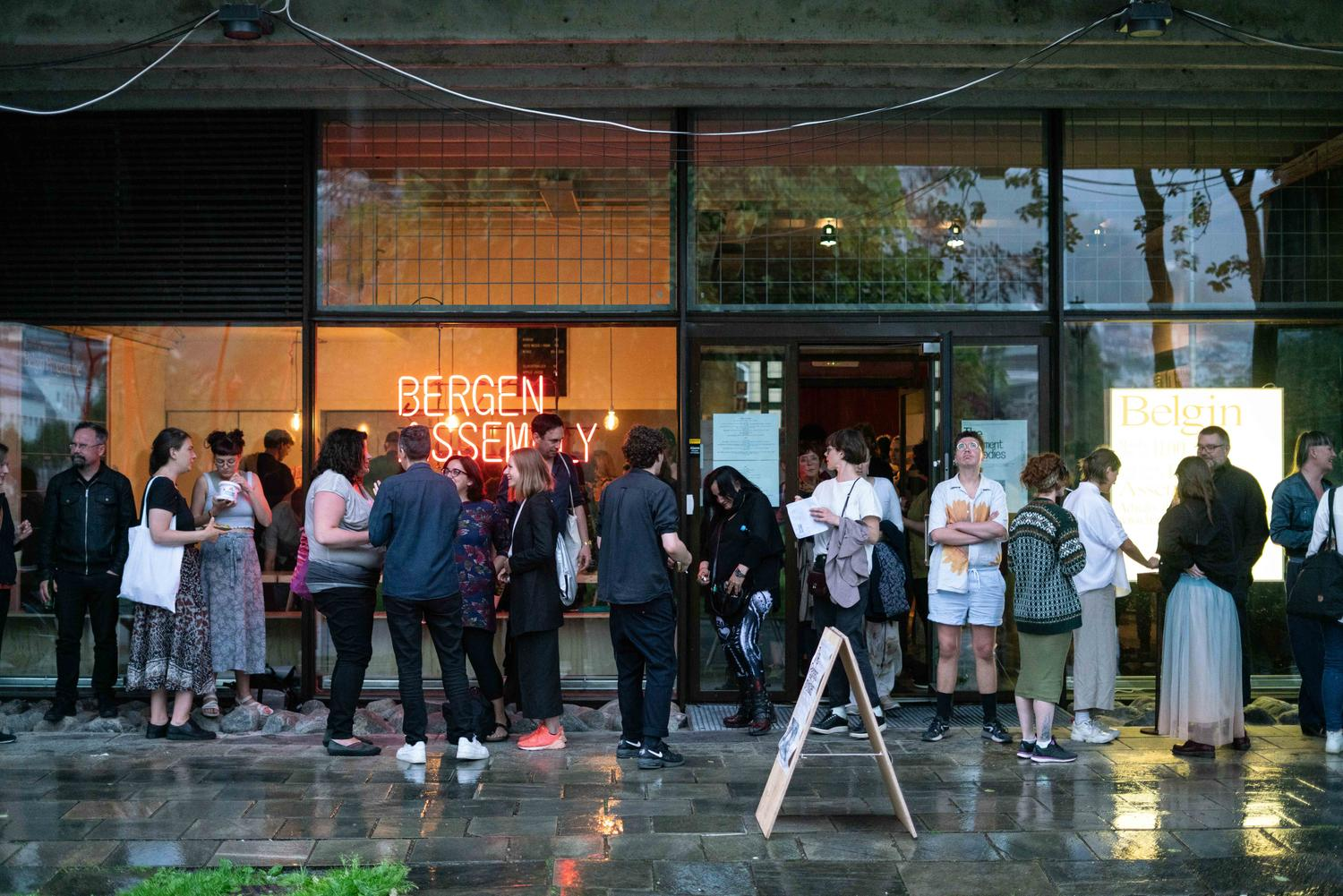
- Genre: Contemporary art
- Begins: 5 September 2019
- Ends: 10 November 2019
- Frequency: Triennial
- Location: Bergen
- Country: Norway
- Previous event: Bergen Assembly 2016
- Next event: Bergen Assembly 2022
- Organizer: Iris Dressler; Hans D. Christ
- Website: Official website

Bergen Assembly 2019, titled Actually, the Dead Are Not Dead, was the third edition of Bergen Assembly and took place from 5 September to 10 November 2019 in Bergen, Norway. It was convened by Iris Dressler and Hans D. Christ and comprised exhibitions, assemblies, and public programmes across multiple venues in the city.

The edition addressed themes including political assembly, death, ecology, migration, disability, and collective life. Conceived as a long-term curatorial and discursive process, the programme foregrounded collaborative formats and ongoing forms of gathering rather than a single centralized exhibition.

The edition was developed collaboratively by the conveners together with a core group of curators, artists, theorists, and activists, including Murat Deha Boduroğlu, Banu Cennetoğlu, María García, Hiwa K, Katia Krupennikova, Viktor Neumann, Paul B. Preciado, Pedro G. Romero, Simon Sheikh, and Emma Wolukau-Wanambwa. The group structured the programme through individual and overlapping projects and collaborations, which expanded to include additional artists and contributors.

Major components included exhibitions at Bergen Kunsthall and the KODE Art Museums, the discursive platform The Parliament of Bodies at the shared public space Belgin, and an extensive mediation and education programme. Activities unfolded through workshops, performances, panels, lectures, and participatory events over several months.

Critical responses noted the project’s political scope and polyphonic structure. Reviews described the edition as ambitious in its breadth while observing that its decentralized and rhizomatic format challenged conventional biennial exhibition models.

== Participants ==
Bergen Assembly 2019 – Venues and Participants
Venue	Exhibition / Project	Artists and Contributors
Bergen Kunsthall	Actually, the Dead Are Not Dead (main exhibition)	Daniel G. Andújar; John Barker; Lorenza Böttner; Lisa Bufano; Sonsherée Giles; Ruth Ewan; Flo6X8; Robert Gabris; Jan Peter Hammer; Hiwa K; Anette Hoffmann; Teresa Lanceta; Pedro G. Romero; Yunyop Lee; Suntag Noh; PEROU; Imogen Stidworthy; The Creators of Oi!; Emma Wolukau-Wanambwa
KODE 1 (West Norway Museum of Decorative Art)	SALON	Lorenza Böttner; Simnikiwe Buhlungu; Malebona Maphutse; Capital Drawing Group; Banu Cennetoğlu; Laressa Dickey; Magdalena Freudenschuss; Ines Doujak; Niklas Goldbach; Minna Henriksson; Niillas Holmberg; Jenni Laiti; Outi Pieski; Alexander Kluge; Darcy Lange; Maria Snijders; Åsa Sonjasdotter; Nina Støttrup Larsen; Emma Wolukau-Wanambwa; Workers’ Families Seeking Justice (WFSJ)
KODE 1 (West Norway Museum of Decorative Art)	CABINET – political parties	Gerd Arntz; August Sander; Franz Wilhelm Seiwert; Serafín Estébanez Calderón; Francisco Lameyer; Toto Estirado; Gonzalo García-Pelayo; Israel Galván; Tony Gatlif; Helios Gómez; Francisco de Goya; Rosario Weiss; Ocaña; Los Putrefactos; Carlos González Ragel; Charles Roka; Situationist International; Ceija Stojka; Pedro G. Romero
Entrée	Troll Swamp	Anne de Boer; Eloïse Bonneviot; The Mycological Twist
Hordaland kunstsenter	Sick and Desiring	Sarah Browne; Juliana Cerqueira Leite; Zoë Claire Miller; Feminist Health Care Research Group; Joscelyn Gardner; Paula Pin; BioTransLab
Bergen Kjøtt	Actually, the Dead Are Not Dead (additional venues)	Daniel G. Andújar; Capital Drawing Group; Pauline Curnier Jardin; Anna Dasović; Laressa Dickey; Ali Gharavi; Ines Doujak; Eva Egermann; Valérie Favre; Magdalena Freudenschuss; Robert Gabris; María Galindo; Niklas Goldbach; Siri Hermansen; Alexander Kluge; Sunaura Taylor; Emma Wolukau-Wanambwa
Belgin (public meeting space)	Shared and overlapping projects	Banu Cennetoğlu; Hiwa K; Nora Heidorn; Iris Dressler; Hans D. Christ; Sarah Browne; Daniela Ramos Arias; Stacy Brafield; John Barker; Ines Doujak; community and local groups
