= Jim Ricks =

Irish and American contemporary artist

- Born: San Francisco, California, United States
- Education: California College of the Arts, National University of Ireland, Galway; Burren College of Art
- Known for: Poulnabrone Bouncy Dolmen, In Search of the Truth, Carpet Bombing
- Website: jimricks.info

Jim Ricks is an American conceptual artist, writer, and curator. He has exhibited internationally, including public art projects.

== Early life and education ==
Ricks was born in San Francisco, California. He started painting graffiti in the early 1990s. He studied photography at the California College of the Arts (2002), and received a Masters from the National University of Ireland, Galway and Burren College of Art (2007).

== Career ==
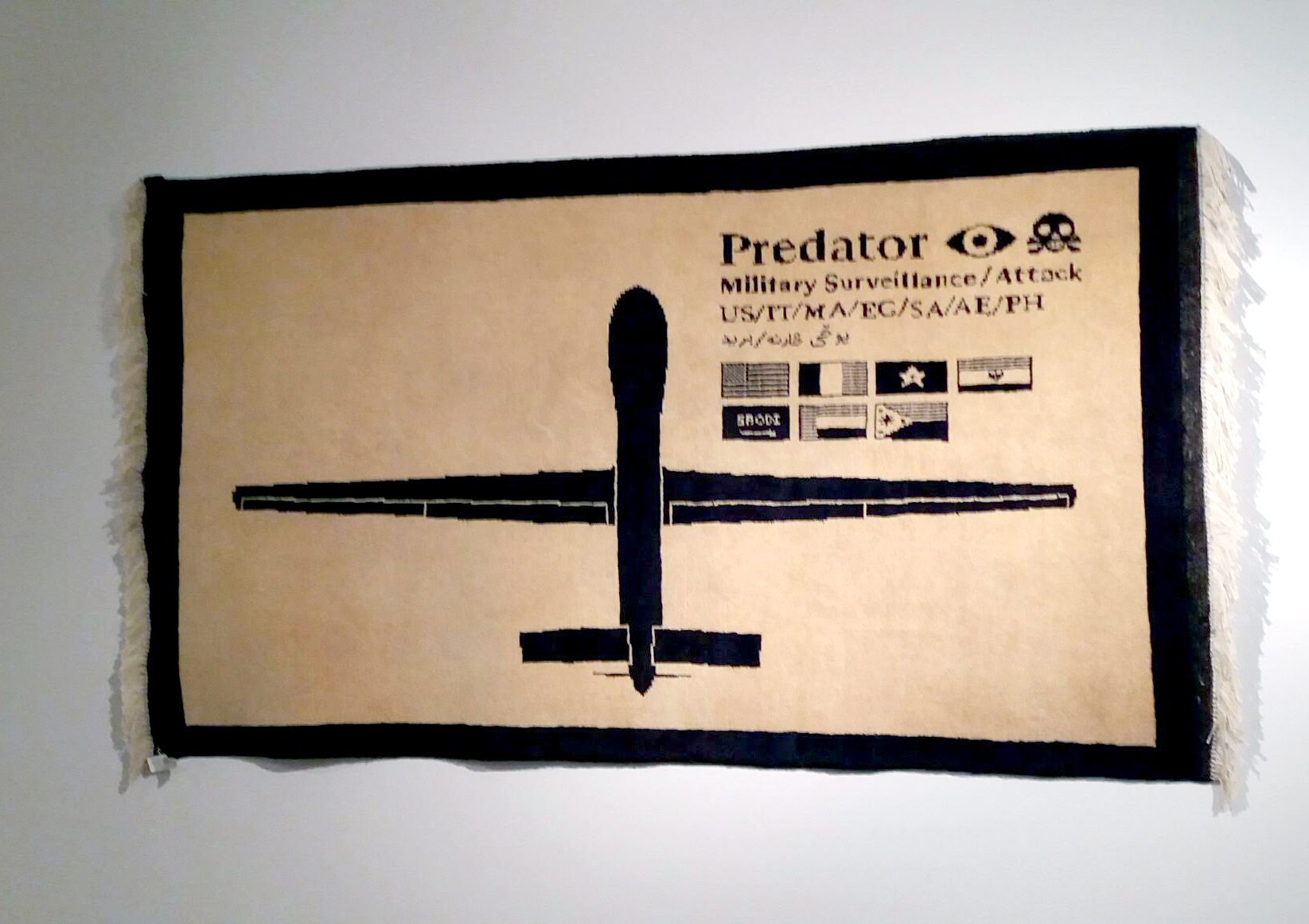
Drone imagery incorporated into the traditional method of Afghan carpet making, shown at the Imperial War Museum 2017.

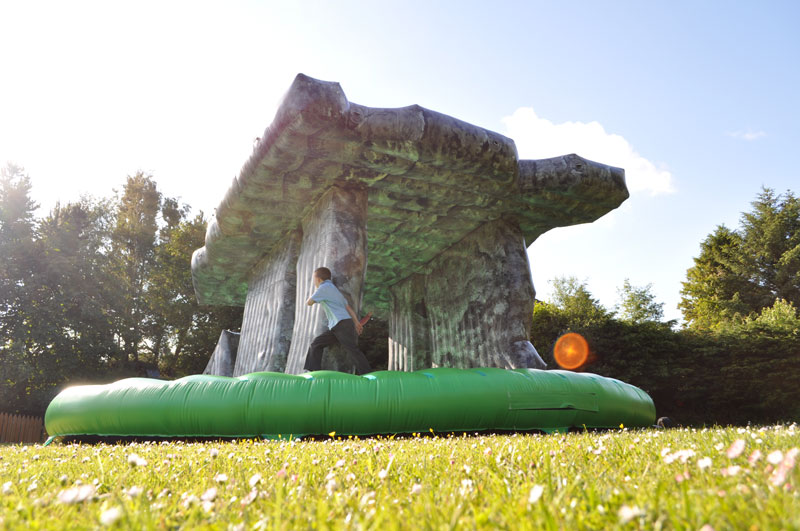
"Poulnabrone Bouncy Dolmen", County Clare, Ireland, 2011

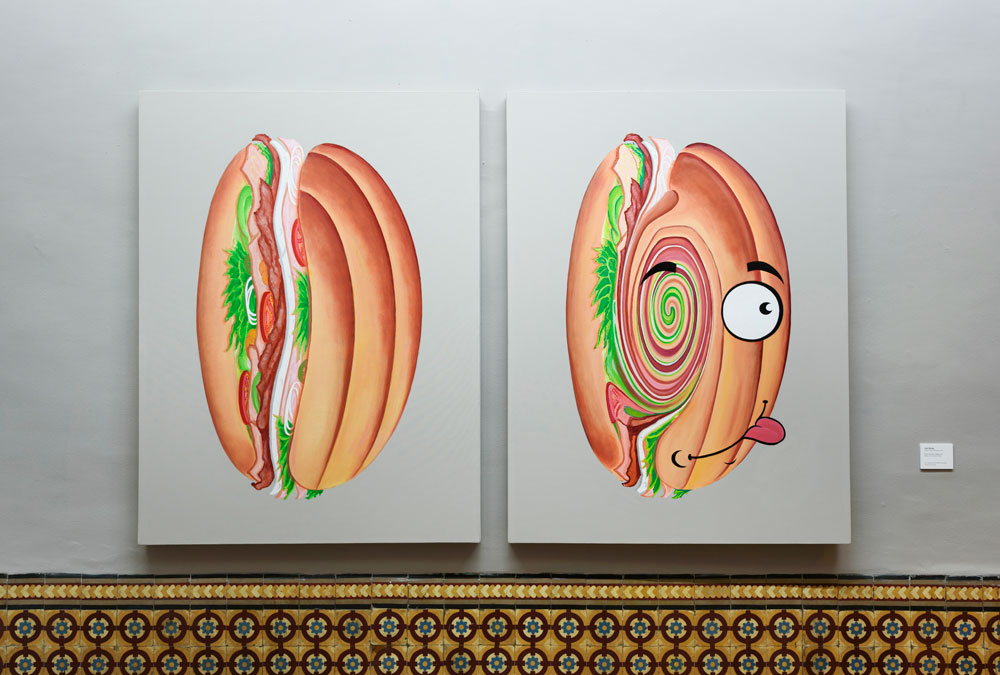
Diptych from a 2016 exhibition in Mexico City.

Ricks utilises appropriation, institutional critique, politics, and humour. He has had solo shows in the United States, Ireland, the Netherlands, and Mexico. Ricks was a director of 126 Artist-run Gallery from 2007 to 2009, curating and working with artist-run spaces. With Stephanie Syjuco, he created knock-offs of work at the Frieze Art Fair in London in 2009.

Since 2010, Ricks has developed the method of synchro-materialism to explore the intersection of art and capitalism. In 2015, while in Afghanistan, he created Carpet Bombing, a traditionally fabricated carpet featuring military drone imagery as an update to Afghan war rugs. He participated in the 2017 Ghetto Biennale in Port-au-Prince, Haiti, and operates The Cash Shop, a contemporary project space in Gort, County Galway.

=== Public projects ===
- Poulnabrone Bouncy Dolmen is a large inflatable double-size replica of the Poulnabrone Dolmen in The Burren. The interactive sculpture has traveled around Ireland since June 2011 and was exhibited alongside Jeremy Deller's inflatable Stonehenge in Belfast and at the Royal Hibernian Academy. Cristín Leach of The Sunday Times described it as a witty commentary on public art and "brand Ireland", noting artist Alice Maher called it "the best public art piece...ever."
- Ricks co-founded the global public art project In Search of the Truth (or En Busca de la Verdad) alongside Ryan Alexiev and Hank Willis Thomas in 2009. Featuring a video confessional booth shaped like a speech bubble, the interactive project has traveled to Ireland, Afghanistan, South Africa, Australia, the United States, and Mexico to record public reflections on truth.
- Life's a Beach (Art imitates life), Gable end mural responding to the political Murals in Northern Ireland, Abercorn Rd., Derry, Northern Ireland, April 2016
- Sesiones Publicas, San Agustín, La Lisa, Cuba, a LASA project, August 2017.

=== Museum projects ===
Ricks was involved in Sleepwalkers (2012–15) at the Hugh Lane Gallery in Dublin. Described by Aidan Dunne of The Irish Times as "a museum within the museum", the process-based exhibition included his solo show Bubble Wrap Game: The Hugh Lane, an open call, closing performances, and curated works by artists including James Barry, Richard Hamilton (artist), and Robert Ballagh.

He was featured in Age of Terror: Art since 9/11 at the Imperial War Museum, London (2018–19).

=== Solo exhibitions ===
- 2010 – Synchromaterialism, Pallas Contemporary Projects, Dublin, Ireland
- 2013–2014 – Bubble Wrap Game: The Hugh Lane, Hugh Lane Gallery, Dublin, Ireland
- 2015 – Alien Invader Super Baby (Synchromaterialism IV), Onomatopee, Eindhoven, The Netherlands
- 2016–2017 – Centro de Ontología Nacional, Casa Maauad, Mexico City, Mexico
- 2018 – Museo Ambulante Sebastián, Mexico City, Mexico
- 2020 – Así Luce la Democracia | This is What Democracy Looks Like, Galeria Daniela Elbahara, Mexico City, Mexico
- 2021–2022 – El camino a París y Londres pasa por las aldeas de Afganistán, Leon Trotsky Museum, Mexico City

== Bibliography ==
- Ricks, Jim (Editor), Artist-run democracy: sustaining a model, 15 years of 126 gallery, Eindhoven: Onomatopee, 2022. ISBN 978-94-93148-73-4
- de Búrca, Ella, Michaële Cutaya, Jim Ricks. IRLDADA: 201916. Mexico City: Black Crown Press, 2019. ISBN 9780578546940
- Ricks, Jim. Alien Invader Super Baby (Synchromaterialism VI). Eindhoven: Onomatopee, 2018. ISBN 9789491677755
- Packer, Matt, Declan Long, and Jim Ricks. "Here Comes The Summer", Derry: Centre for Contemporary Art Derry~Londonderry, 2017.
- Bossan, Enrico. 2016 an image of Ireland : contemporary artists from Ireland. Crocetta del Montello: Antiga edizioni, 2016. ISBN 9788899657185
- Edited by Michael Dempsey and Logan Sisley. Sleepwalkers. Dublin: Hugh Lane Gallery and Ridinghouse, 2015. ISBN 9781905464982

== See also ==
- Appropriation
- Gesamtkunstwerk
- Synchromysticism
