= Pallas Projects/Studios =

Contemporary art gallery and studio in Dublin, Ireland

- Location within Central Dublin
- Established: 1996
- Location: 115–117 The Coombe, The Liberties, Dublin, Ireland
- Coordinates: 53.3391°N 6.2746°W
- Type: Contemporary art gallery
- Founders: Mark Cullen, Brian Duggan
- Directors: Mark Cullen, Gavin Murphy
- Website: pallasprojects.org

The Pallas Projects/Studios (PP/S, Pallas Studios, Pallas Contemporary Projects) is an artist-run and non-commercial gallery and studio space in Dublin, Ireland.

== History ==
Pallas Projects was founded in 1996. The founders of Pallas say its survival is owed to “a stubborn willingness to adapt and transform”. Having had several locations in Dublin, the gallery and studio space is currently housed at the end of an alley in an old school building in the Coombe.

== Projects and exhibitions ==
Offside was a 2005 project in The Hugh Lane and included works by Albano Afonso, Antistrot, Anna Boyle, Rhona Byrne, Mark Cullen, Brian Duggan, John Dummet, Brendan Earley, Andreas Gefeller, Niamh McCann, Alex McCullagh, Nina McGowan, Nathaniel Mellors, Clive Murphy, Adriette Myburgh, Cris Neumann, Paul O’Neill, Garrett Phelan, Abigail Reynolds, Mark Titchner, Rich Streitmatter-Tran. It also had two off-site locations, including a partially inhabited public housing apartment building – the exhibitions in this location were titled: Pallas Heights.

In 2009 Pallas hosted a solo exhibition by Stephanie Syjuco called Unsolicited Fabrications: Shareware Sculptures, in which the artist made sculptures from Google SketchUp models out of cheap materials.

As part of their 2024 Artist-Initiated Projects series, Pallas hosted Lee Welch's solo exhibition In praise of idleness. It marked the artist's first solo gallery presentation in ten years following his 2013 solo exhibition at The Hugh Lane, and preceded his 2025 solo exhibition Oedipus at The Complex.

The Future is Self-Organised – Artist-Run Spaces was an exhibition curated by Pallas Projects at the Limerick City Gallery of Art. A number of artist-run spaces and projects from Ireland and abroad were represented, as well as artists who have worked with Pallas over its 20 year history, in this 2015–16 exhibition.

Since 2010, Mark Cullen and Gavin Murphy, the directors of Pallas Projects, annually invite two curators to assist in a thematic survey show, titled: Periodical Review. It is ostensibly an exhibition of contemporary artistic activity in Ireland in the preceding year. In 2026, co-director Gavin Murphy was named the winner of the biennial Merrion Plinth Award for contemporary visual art.

== Bibliography ==
- Murphy, Gavin. Artist-Run Europe: Practice/Projects/Spaces. Eindhoven: Onomatopee (2016). ISBN 9789491677564
