= Re-Edition Texts: Heart of Darkness =

Four examples

Re-Editioned Texts: Heart of Darkness is a novel by Stephanie Syjuco, with 12 reproduced versions of Joseph Conrad's novel Heart of Darkness. Each version of the novel includes Joseph Conrad's Heart of Darkness opened in different online sources and printed without any changes. Each version is unique to the other 11. Differences include Font size, Font type, advertisements, and even mistakes.

== Background ==
The original novel by Joseph Conrad was written in 1899. Stephanie Syjuco only produced 10 volumes even though she recreated 12 versions. The novel was produced in 2011, and each volume is titled by the source that was used to open it originally. The novel is print on demand. Syjuco also has produced another set of work, where she re-created 3 versions of Ray Bradbury's Fahrenheit 451. This type of writing leaves ambiguity of the author and the publisher between digital versions of a specific file.

== Plot ==
Heart of Darkness is a novel told in the first person perspective that surrounds the character Marlow as he retells the story of when he traveled through Africa for his trade company. The novel alludes to Africa as a place of darkness, thus the title referring to being in the heart of Africa or heart of "Darkness". The novel describes Africa as a place of evil, and violent natives. The character Kurtz displays the effects of living in such a place for a long time. Kurtz grows ill and eventually passes, but he shows his passions for how much he loved Africa and how much he didn't want to leave. At one point he leaves wood for the steamer ship in a hut, and after the ship takes on all the wood, they are attacked by the natives. Later it is discovered that Kurtz organized the attack so that he could stay in Africa. Kurtz had grown to love his life in Africa and the culture, for example when the ship picks him up, there's a woman watching as the ship leaves, and that woman is Kurtz significant other.

== Reception ==
The novel received mixed reviews due to the fact that many people are against the idea of "Uncreative Writing". The novel cannot be found on Amazon. The novel and Stephanie Syjuco did not receive positive reviews from the website Soulellis. There is a piece of the article "Search, Compile, Publish" dedicated to Stephanie and her works that tells of how she goes about creating her work. She's even compared with the leader of the "Uncreative Movement", Kenneth Goldsmith. The biggest criticism of "Uncreative writing" is that the product created is not the actual work of the person whom re-created the piece of literature or art.
