= Niamh McCann (Irish artist) =

Irish visual artist and sculptor

- Born: 1971 (age 53–54); Dublin, Ireland

Niamh McCann is an Irish visual artist. Her "work includes sculpture, installation, video and painting."

== Early life and education ==
McCann is from Rathfarnham and continues to live and work in Dublin, Ireland. She studied at National College of Art and Design, Dublin, the Crawford College of Art, Cork, and Chelsea College of Art and Design, London.

== Career ==
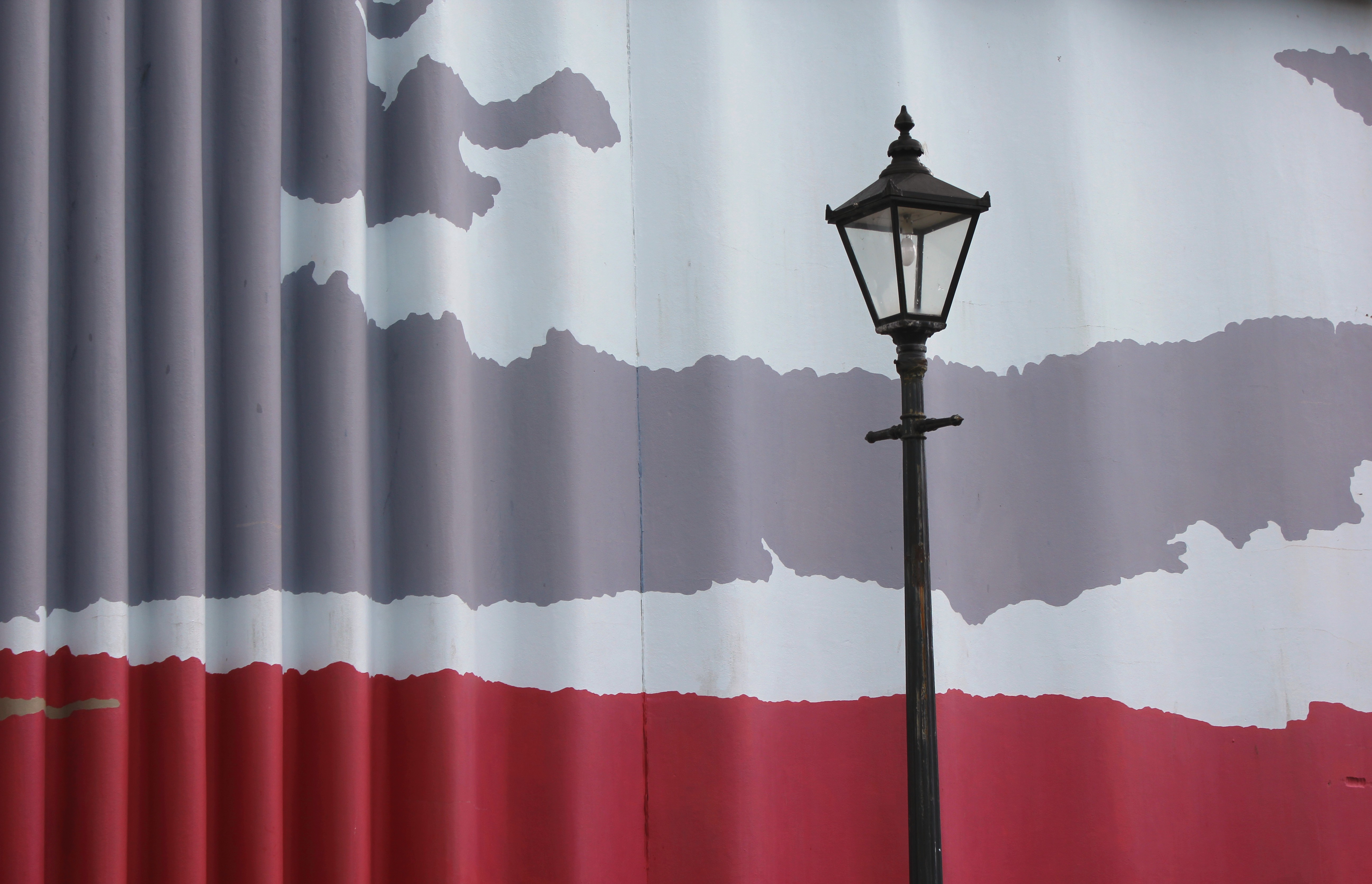
A portion of 'Flock Of Ospreys Looking For The Old Blind Sea Captain', a mural on the exterior of Swansea's Dylan Thomas Theatre, created by McCann in 2007

McCann was a director of Visual Artists Ireland in 2013. She was awarded a Visual Arts Bursary from the Arts Council in 2018. She was commissioned to produce work for the Museum of Country Life's 'On Sight' annual exhibition in 2019. She is on residency in Temple Bar Gallery and Studios from 2022 to 2025. In 2022, McCann received the Solas Nua "Norman Houston Commissioning Award".

McCann has works in the collection of the Irish Museum of Modern Art, the Hugh Lane, and the Arts Council of Ireland.

== Solo exhibitions and works ==
- 'someone decides, hawk or dove' - STABLE Arts, Washington, D.C.; The MAC Belfast - 2023/24
- 'Sentinals [flew through the ages in the shape of birds]' - Carey's Lane, Cork - 2023
- Hairline Crack [a dialogue]' - Irish Cultural Centre, Paris - 2023
- 'Tableaux Vivants' (curator) - Hugh Lane Gallery, Dublin - 2020
- (untitled) (w/ Damien Flood) - Courthouse Gallery, Ennis, County Clare - 2021
- 'Mother's Lament' - Museum of Country Life, County Mayo - 2019
- 'Furtive Tears' - Hugh Lane Gallery - 2018/19
- 'La Perruque (Protest Song)' - The MAC Belfast - 2016
- 'Just Left of Copernicus' - Visual Carlow - 2015
- Changing States (with others), Centre for Fine Arts, Brussels
- 'Insertions', Green on Red Gallery, Dublin - 2012
- 'GRADUATES' - 2012
- 'Niamh McCann', The Void, Derry - 2011
- 'TiltShift' - Hugh Lane - 2010
- 'HIAP Project Space' - Finland - 2009
- 'Purlieu' Green on Red Gallery, Dublin - 2009
- 'Flock Of Ospreys Looking For The Old Blind Sea Captain' (mural) - Dylan Thomas Theatre, Swansea - 2007
- '<<<EME', Pallas Heights, Dublin - 2005
- 'Total Eclipse of …' - Planet 22, Geneva - 2001
