= In Search of the Truth =

- Location: Worldwide
- Owner: The Cause Collective
- Founder: Ryan Alexiev; Jim Ricks; Hank Willis Thomas
- Established: 2011
- Status: Active
- Website: insearchofthetruth.net

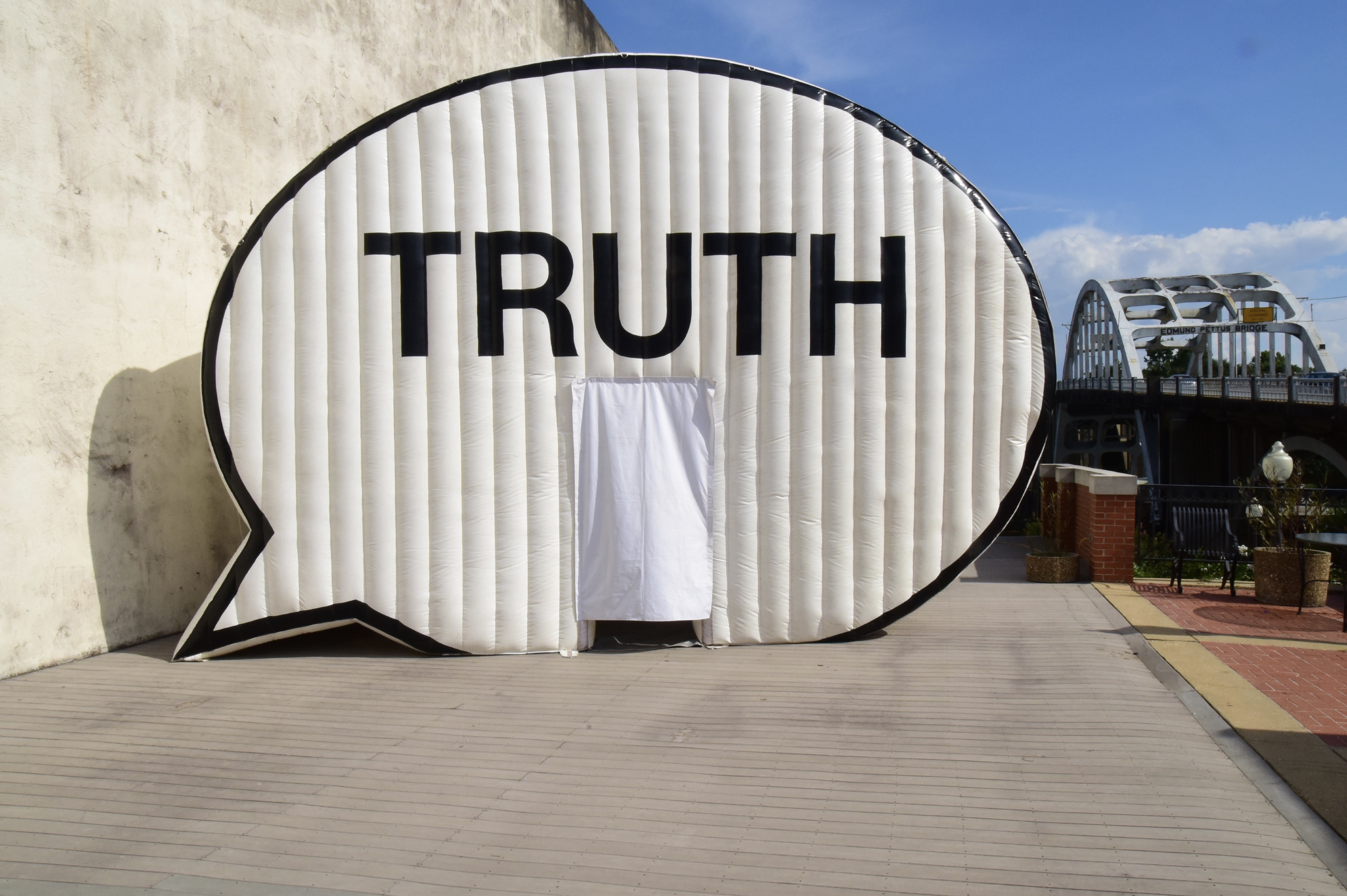
The collaborative traveling artwork is sited in front of the Edmund Pettus Bridge in Selma, Alabama, September, 2018

In Search of the Truth is an international, interactive public art project of a touring, inflatable recording booth called 'The Truth Booth'. The Booth is a 16-foot-tall by 23-foot-wide speech bubble that permits visitors to record videos of themselves completing the sentence, "The truth is...". It was established in 2011 as a collaboration between Ryan Alexiev, Hank Willis Thomas and Jim Ricks.

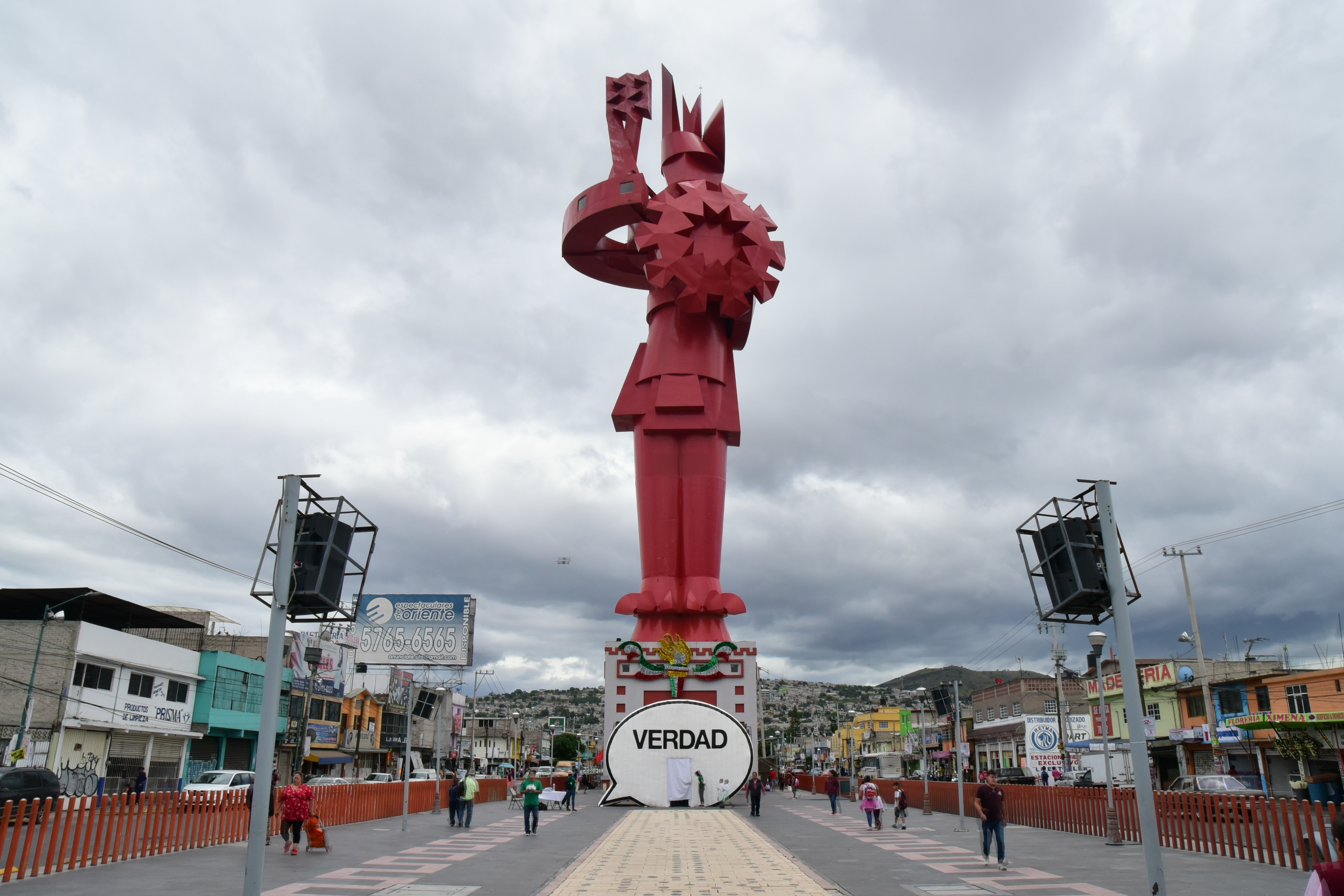
In front of the Guerrero Chimalli, a Sebastián sculpture in Chimalhuacán, Mexico during the En Busca de la Verdad tour 2018.

== History ==
Between fake news and fact checking, the truth has never been more contested, which makes this a very timely project.

— Clover Moore, Lord Mayor of Sydney, The Australian

The project was started in 2009 by artists Ryan Alexiev, Hank Willis Thomas and Jim Ricks. Will Sylvester and, now deceased LGBTQ organizer, Jorge Sanchez joined the project in years following. All are members of the artist collective Cause Collective. In 2011, the project was first shown at the Galway International Arts Festival in Ireland. It debuted in the US during the LOOK3 Festival of the Photograph in Charlottesville, VA in June 2012.

The New York Times writes: "The "Truth Booth"... in the shape of a cartoon word bubble with "TRUTH" in bold letters on its side, serves as a video confessional. Visitors are asked to sit inside and finish the politically and metaphysically loaded sentence that begins, "The truth is ..."".

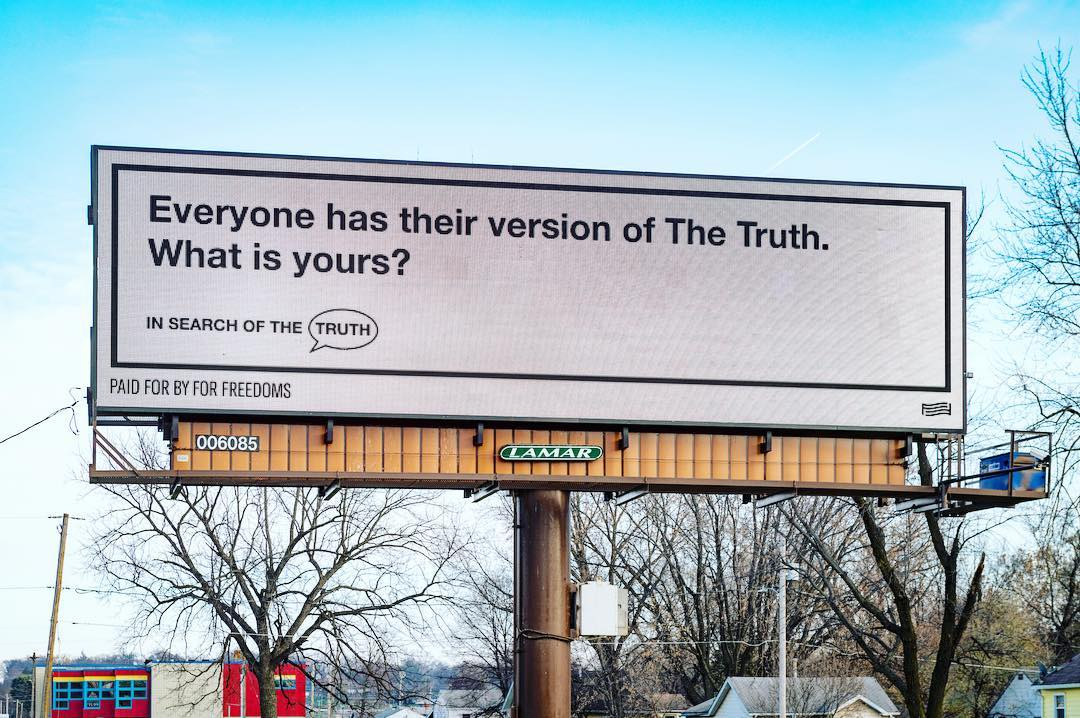
In Search of the Truth with For Freedoms, 2018

The project toured Afghanistan in 2013 in a partnership with Free Press Unlimited, a media development organization based in Amsterdam, the Netherlands, and 1TV (Afghan TV channel). In 2016, it launched a 50-state tour of the United States before the 2016 United States presidential election.

It has also appeared in South Africa, Australia, and in 2018 toured Mexico from Chiapas to Juarez visiting 20 locations under the name: En Busca de la Verdad. The 'Booth', the Mexican videos, and a documentary about the 2018 tour are part of the Hirshhorn Museum and Sculpture Garden's exhibition Manifesto: Art x Agency showing 2019 – 20. In Search of the Truth was exhibited as part of the Melbourne Fringe Festival in September of 2019 and in October of 2019 the project came to St. Louis and visited Ferguson.

== See also ==
- Art intervention
- Galway International Arts Festival
- Public art
