= Barbara Dawson =

Irish art historian, museum gallery director, and curator (born 1957)

Barbara Dawson (born 26 April 1957) is an Irish author, editor, art historian, gallery director, and curator. She is curator of several art exhibitions including the works of notable artists such as Francis Bacon (2009).

Dawson is the first female director of the Hugh Lane Gallery, a municipal art gallery and "the first known public gallery of modern art in the world" in Dublin. She has been the gallery's director since 1991. She authored several books including Hugh Lane Gallery: Director's Choice.

== Education ==
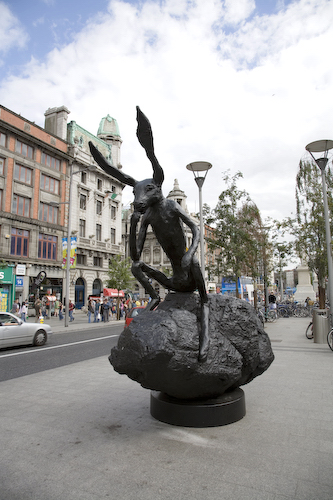
Barry Flanagan (1941–2009)

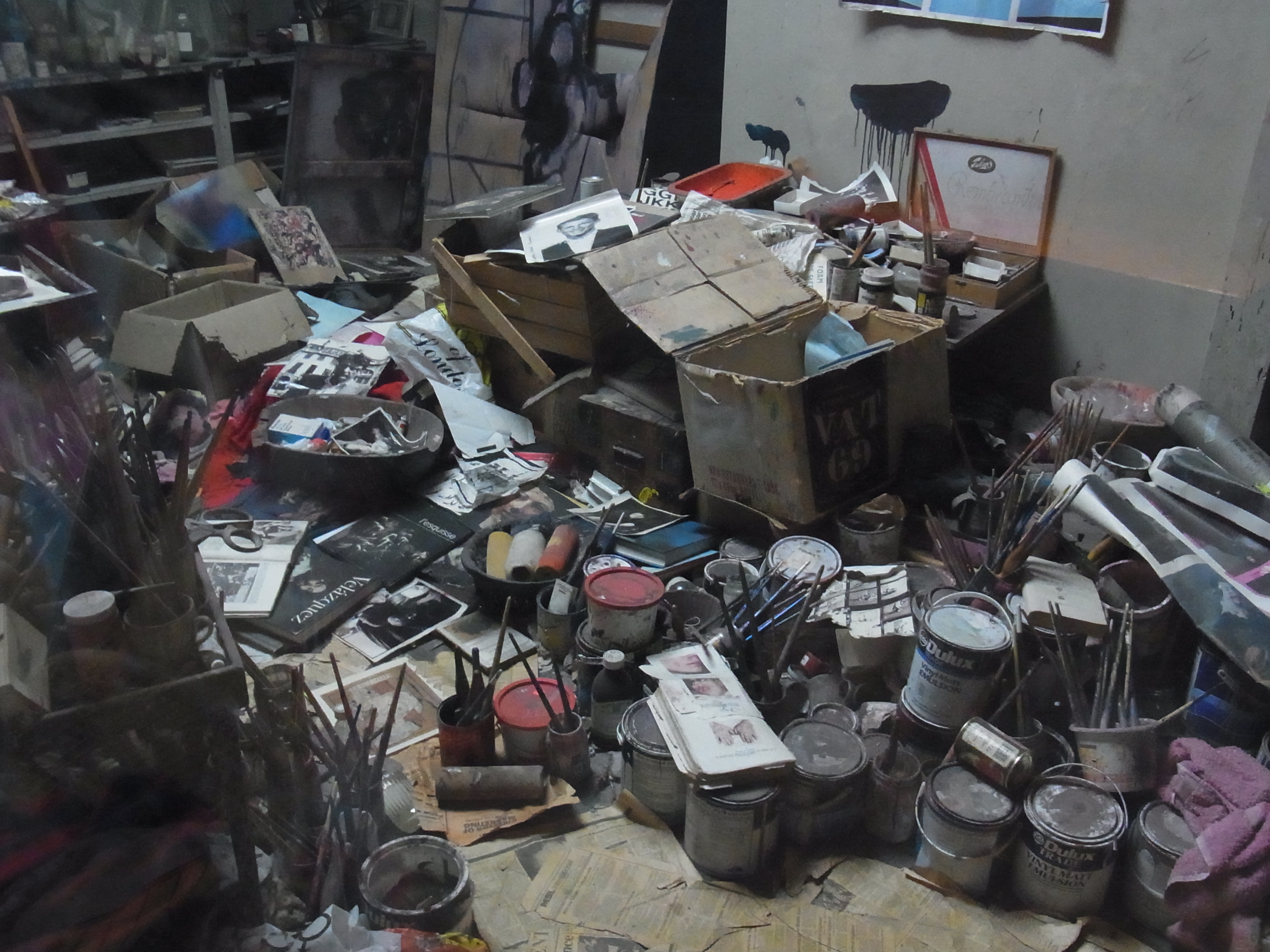
Francis Bacon's studio at the City Gallery The Hugh Lane, Dublin, Ireland

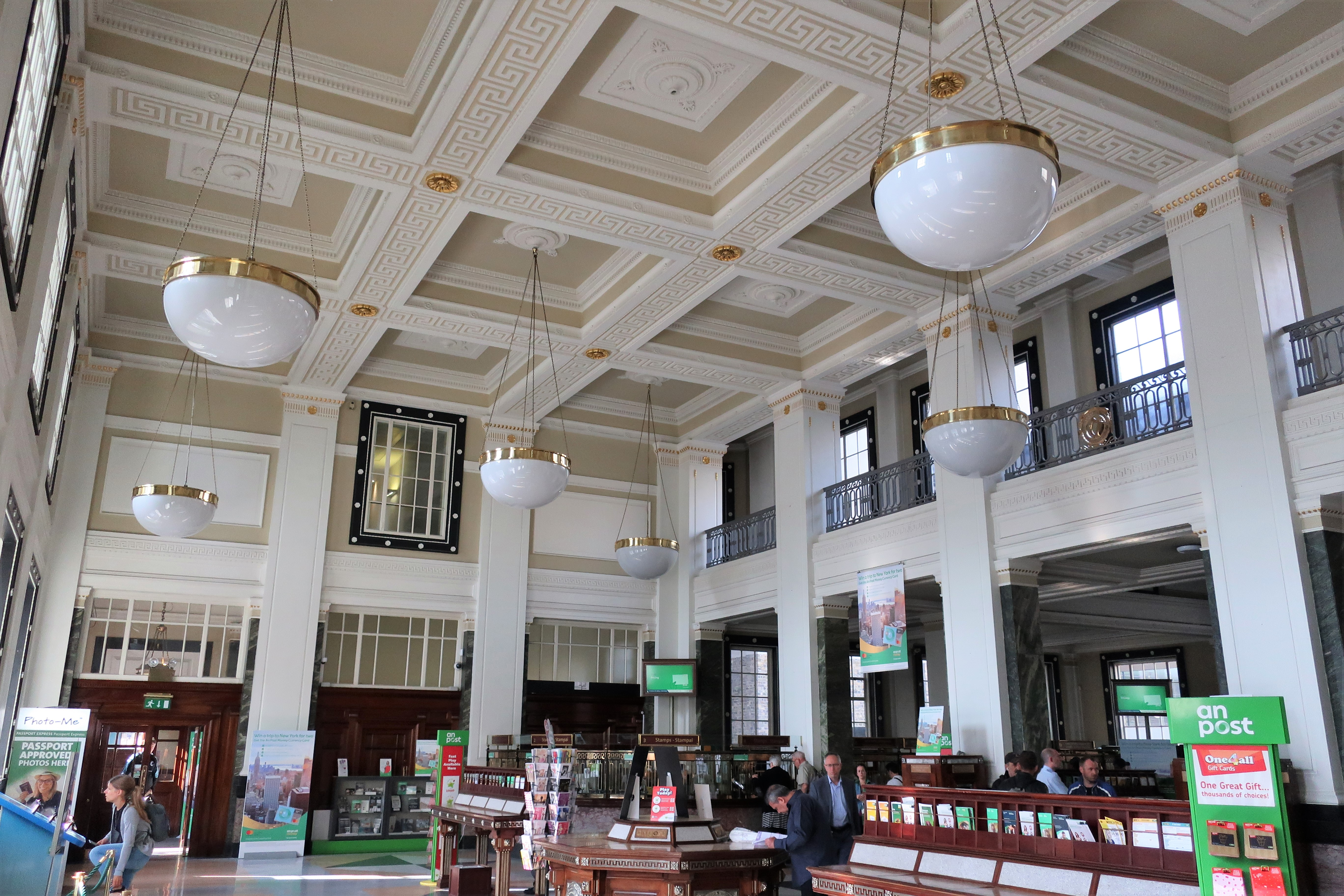
General Post Office, O'Connell Street, Dublin

Dawson graduated from University College Dublin in 1979 with a bachelor's degree in history.

In recognition of her 2010 contributions to the fine arts, she received an honorary Doctor of Fine Arts degree from the National College of Art & Design (NCAD). She is an adjunct professor at the School of Art History and Cultural Policy, University College Dublin. In 2019, she was awarded the UCD Alumni Award in Arts & Humanities.

She serves as a member of the Dublin City Council's Public Art Advisory Committee, and has been a mentor to women at other Irish museums.

== Art gallery career ==
Dawson's early gallery experiences began with the National Gallery of Ireland. In 1991, at the age of 34, she became the director of the Hugh Lane Gallery, located in Parnell Square in Dublin. The gallery is owned by the municipality of Dublin and overseen by Dublin's city manager, to whom Dawson, as gallery director, reports via the City and County Librarian.

Dawson has curated notable exhibitions for Hugh Lane Gallery, such as:

- Francis Bacon – A Terrible Beauty (with Martin Harrison; 2009)
- Barry Flanagan on O'Connell Street (2007)
- Hugh Lane – 100 Years (2008)
- Richard Tuttle – Triumphs (with Michael Dempsey; 2010)

Dawson acquired Francis Bacon's London studio for the museum in 1998. The 6 meter by 4 meter studio was reconstructed inside the Hugh Lane Gallery to the smallest details, including ceiling, flooring, and dirt.

According to The Phoenix, in 2017, Dawson launched a five-year strategy for "doubling visitor numbers, significantly upping funding, undertaking a near €4m refurbishment programme and purchasing major artworks" from 2018 to 2023.

=== Theft of In The Omnibus ===
In June 1992, the year after Dawson became director of the Hugh Lane Gallery, the painting In The Omnibus by French artist Honore Daumier was stolen. The theft took place in the afternoon during the hours when the gallery was open to the public. The Criminal Assets Bureau recovered the painting during an investigation in 2013, more than 20 years later. Dawson expressed her delight that the painting had been found. She said "It was such a shock when it was stolen and we had messages of sympathy from galleries and museums in Ireland and around the world."

== Author and editor ==
Dawson has authored and edited multiple books and texts on contemporary and modern art such as:

- Turner in the National Gallery of Ireland, Dublin (1988); ISBN 978-0903162463
- Images and Insights: Catalogue of an Exhibition of Works from the Permanent Collection at the Hugh Lane Municipal Gallery of Modern Art, Dublin, 1993 - with Sean O'Reilly, Christina Kennedy, Crista Maria Lerm, Catherine Marshall, Daire O'Connell, and Wanda Ryan Smolin, ISBN 978-0951424636
- Impressionism in Britain and Ireland - with Kenneth McConkey (June 1995); ISBN 978-0951424667
- Francis Bacon: Francis Bacon's Studio - with Margarita Cappock (July 2001); ISBN 978-1901702156
- Hugh Lane: Founder of a Gallery of Modern Art for Ireland, Scala (2008) ISBN 9781857595758
- Francis Bacon: A Terrible Beauty Steidl (28 February 2010); ISBN 978-3869300276
- Barry Flanagan: The Spade and The Soufflé (Richard Tuttle)
