= Stephanie Syjuco =

Filipino-born American conceptual artist, educator (born 1974)

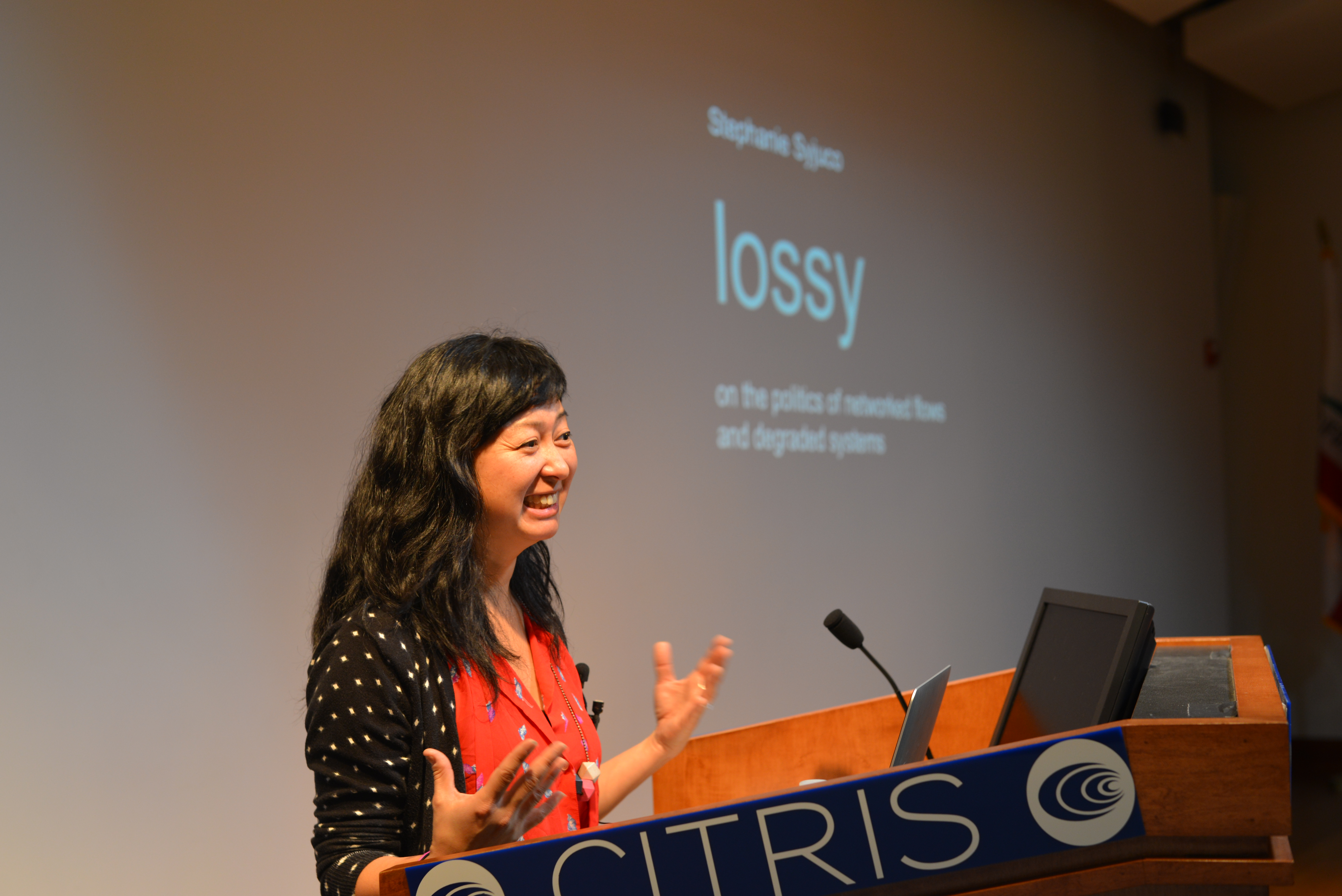
- Born: 1974 (age 51–52); Manila, Philippines
- Education: San Francisco Art Institute (BFA); Stanford University (MFA)
- Occupations: Visual artist, educator
- Known for: Photography, sculpture, installation art
- Awards: 2014 John Simon Guggenheim Memorial Foundation
- Website: www.stephaniesyjuco.com

Stephanie Syjuco (born 1974, in Manila, Philippines), is a Filipino-born American conceptual artist and educator. She works in photography, sculpture, and installation art. Born in the Philippines, she moved to the San Francisco Bay Area in 1977. She lives in Oakland, California, and teaches art at the University of California, Berkeley.

== Education ==
Stephanie Syjuco received a BFA degree in sculpture from the San Francisco Art Institute in 1995; she studied at the Skowhegen School of Painting and Sculpture (1997); and received a MFA degree from Stanford University in 2005.

== Career ==
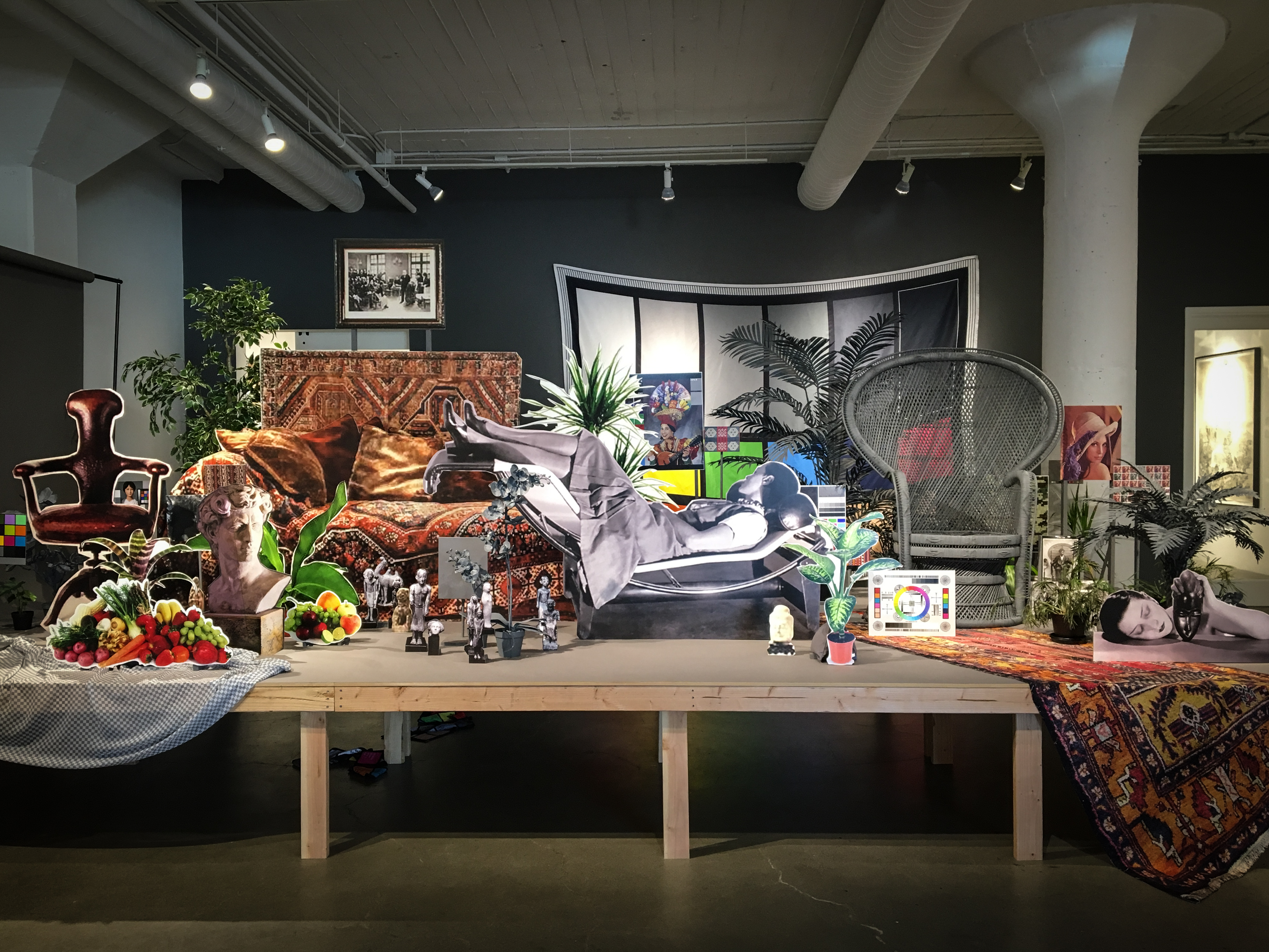
2016 solo exhibition at Catherine Clark Gallery, San Francisco

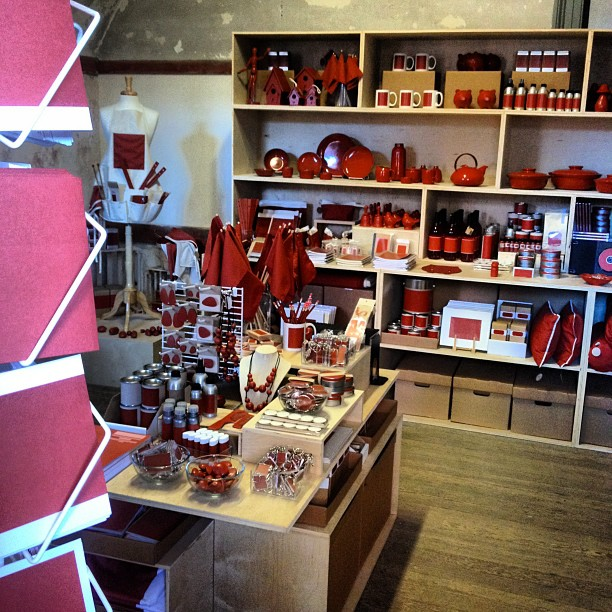
2012 installation at Fort Point, San Francisco

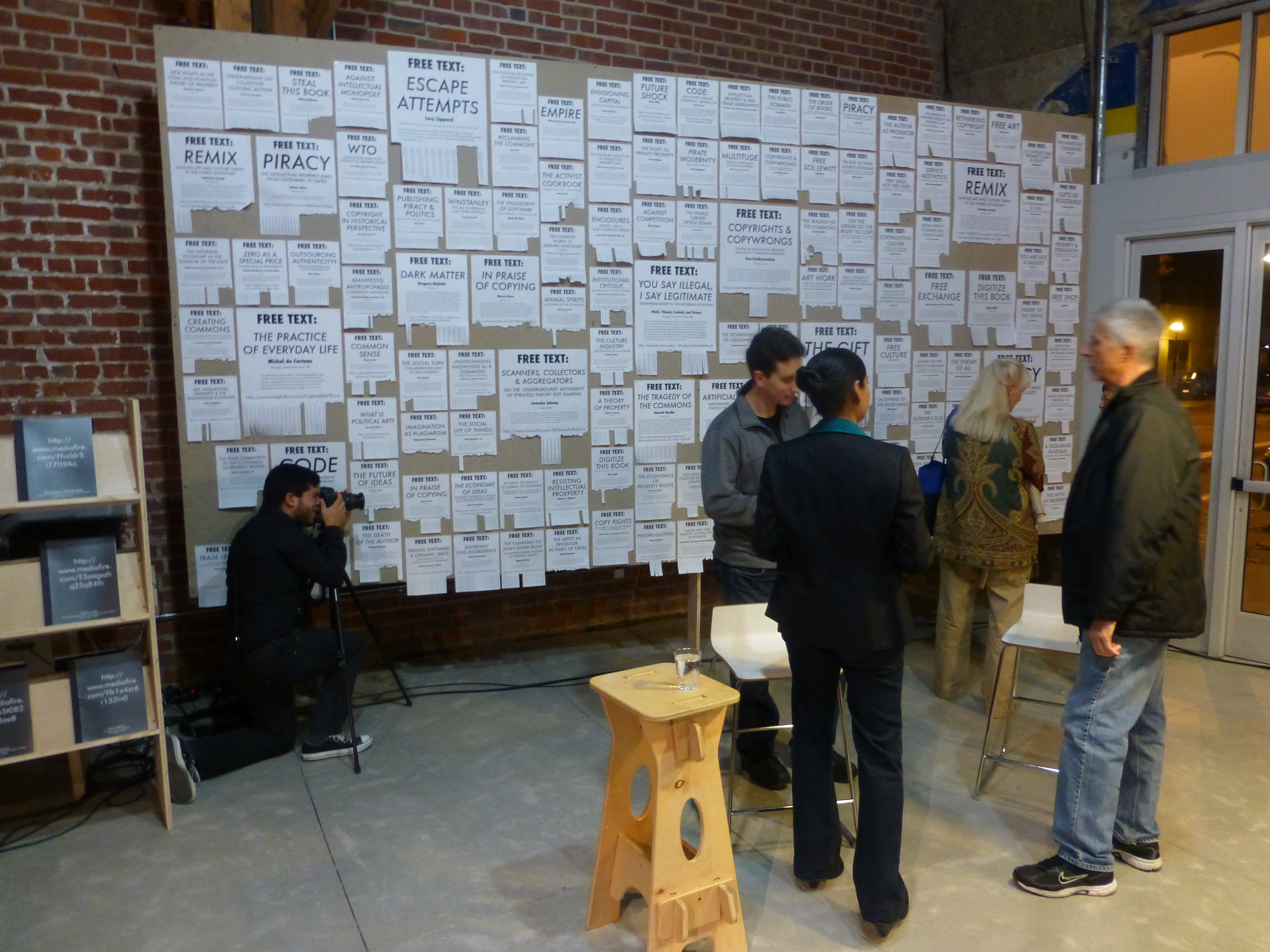
2012 Commission for the ZERO1 Biennial, San Jose

Syjuco works in photography, sculpture, and installation, moving from handmade and craft-inspired mediums to digital editing and archive excavations. Her projects leverage open-source systems, shareware logic, and flows of capital, in order to investigate issues of economies and empire. Recently, she has focused on how photography and image-based processes are implicated in the construction of racialized, exclusionary narratives of American history and citizenship.

Her early artwork explored the friction between the authentic and the counterfeit, addressing political concerns regarding issues of labor and economies within the capitalist system. In 2009 she created Copystand: An autonomous manufacturing zone for the Frieze Art Fair in London. The Wall Street Journal notes: "Other artists, meanwhile, are openly toying with the fair's changing economics... San Francisco-based artist Stephanie Syjuco and several of her artist friends are making copycat versions of their favorite fair pieces, which she is selling at "heavily discounted" prices ranging from roughly $30 to $750."

A long-time educator, she is an Associate Professor in Sculpture in the Art Practice Department at the University of California Berkeley, having joined the department in 2013. Prior to being at Berkeley, she was a visiting lecturer at numerous art programs, including The California College of the Arts, San Francisco Art Institute, Mills College, and Carnegie Mellon University. She is represented by Catharine Clark Gallery in San Francisco, RYAN LEE Gallery in New York, and Silverlens Gallery, Manila. Her work is in the collection of the Museum of Modern Art, New York, San Francisco Museum of Modern Art, Di rosa, The Smithsonian American Art Museum and the Whitney Museum of American Art., among others. She is the recipient of a 2014 Guggenheim Fellowship in Visual Arts and a 2009 Joan Mitchell Foundation Painters and Sculptors Program grant. In 2018, she was featured in the San Francisco Bay Area episode of PBS's Art21: Art in the 21st Century.

In 2011 Syjuco made Re-Edition Texts: Heart of Darkness.

In September 2019 Syjuco opened a large solo exhibition titled Rogue States at the Contemporary Art Museum St. Louis.

In 2024 Syjuco opened After/Images, a large-scale exhibit with an focus on photography and videography of Filipinos to showcase the impacts of colonialism through the framing and existence of the visual medium.

== Exhibitions ==
Exhibitions include a show at the Contemporary Art Museum St. Louis, "Being: New Photography" at the Museum of Modern Art, New York, "Public Knowledge," at the San Francisco Museum of Modern Art, Disrupting Craft: The Renwick Invitational (2018-2019) at the Smithsonian American Art Museum, and This site is under Revolution the Moscow Museum of Modern Art.

- 2024 Stephanie Syjuco: After/Images, Frye Art Museum, Seattle, Washington
- 2024 Dodge + Burn, Catharine Clark Gallery, San Francisco, California
- 2023 Recent Acquisitions: Stephanie Syjuco, Allen Memorial Art Museum, Oberlin College, Oberlin, Ohio
- 2017 CITIZENS, Ryan Lee Gallery, New York, New York
- 2016 Neutral Calibration Studies (Ornament + Crime), Catharine Clark Gallery, San Francisco, California
- 2013 RAIDERS Redux, Catharine Clark Gallery Project Space, New York, New York
- 2011 Currents Series: Stephanie Syjuco: Pattern Migration, Columbus Museum of Art, Ohio
- 2011 RAIDERS, Catharine Clark Gallery, San Francisco, California
- 2010 notMOMA, Washington State University, Pullman, Washington
- 2009 1969, PS1, New York
- 2009 Unsolicited Fabrications, Pallas Contemporary Projects with 126 Artist-run Gallery, Dublin, Ireland
- 2008 Perspectives Series 164: Total Fabrications, Contemporary Arts Museum Houston, Texas

== Bibliography ==
- Syjuco, Stephanie. Stephanie Syjuco: The Unruly Archives. 2024 ISBN 9798890180766
- See, Sarita E. The Filipino primitive : accumulation and resistance in the American museum. New York: New York University Press, 2017. ISBN 9780811835411
- Hart, Dakin, and Jenny Dixon. Museum of stones : ancient and contemporary art at the Noguchi Museum. New York London: The Isamu Noguchi Foundation and Garden Museum in association with D Giles Limited, 2016. ISBN 9781479842667
- Syjuco, Stephanie. Comparative Morphologies: Complete Variations. 2008.
- Syjuco, Stephanie. Misproductions: Stephanie Syjuco. 2006.
- Johnstone, Mark, and Leslie Holzman. Epicenter : San Francisco Bay area art now. San Francisco: Chronicle Books, 2002. ISBN 9781907804861
