= Sarah Browne =

Contemporary Irish artist

Sarah Browne is a contemporary Irish artist who works in public art, performance, sculpture, and collaboration. She represented Ireland with a collaborator at the 2009 Venice Biennale.

== Work ==
The Arts Council of Ireland describes her as "an artist whose practice is concerned with non-verbal, bodily experiences of knowledge and justice." Browne's "research-based practice investigates the materiality of knowledge, attending to the intersection of invisible structures of power with bodily experience".

== Career ==
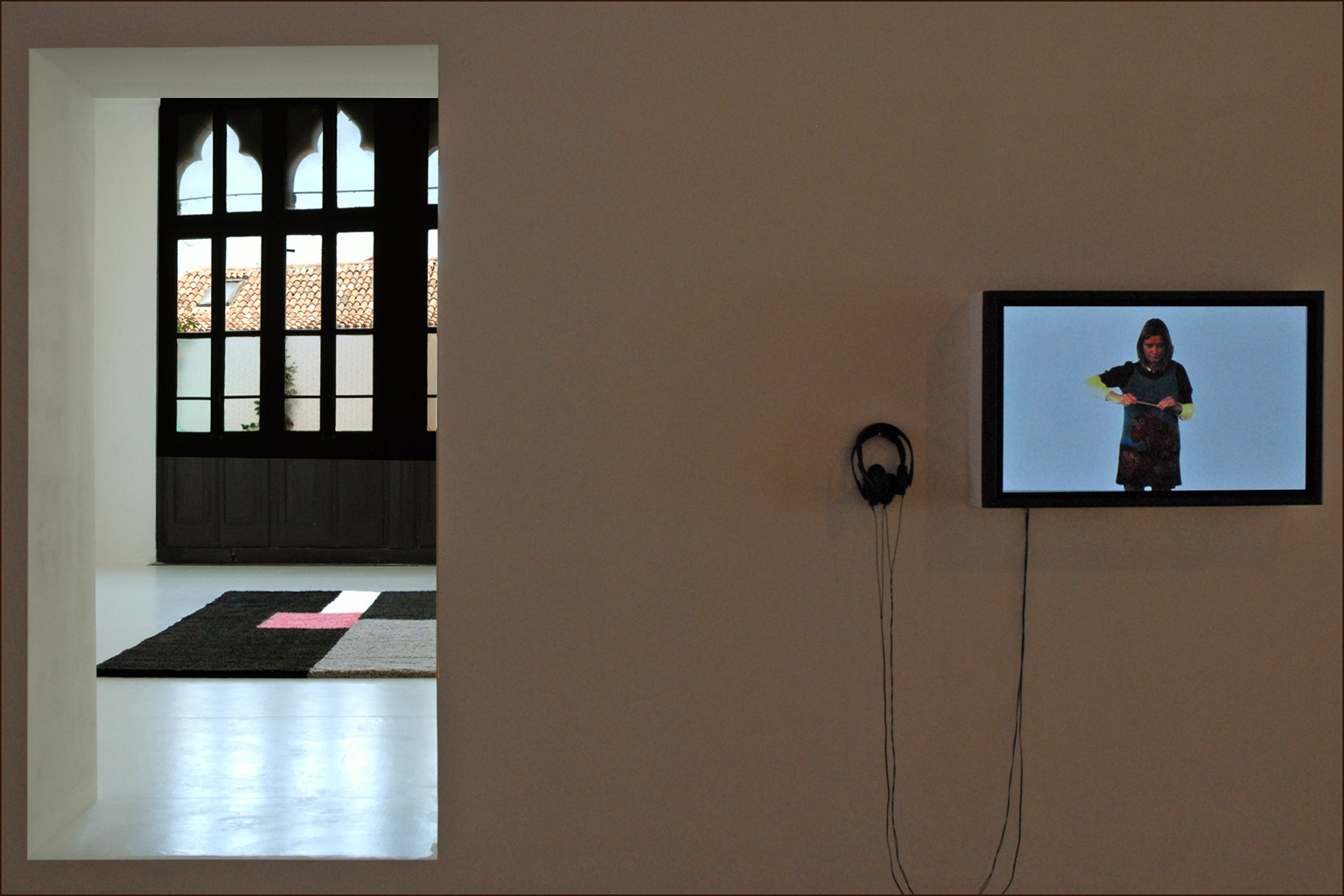
Installation view of Sarah Browne's and Kennedy Browne's work at the Irish Pavilion in Venice in 2009.

Browne has worked for many years collaboratively with Gareth Kennedy under the name Kennedy Browne. The duo exhibited together, and separately, at the Irish Pavilion at the 53rd Venice Biennale in 2009. Browne "commissioned a hand-knotted carpet from Donegal Carpets" and "as Kennedy Browne they’ve made a video work in which volunteers, situated in the iconic setting of Liberty Hall, narrate a text taken from Milton Friedman’s commentary on the virtues of the free market." They also exhibited 3 films as the Redaction Trilogy at the Hugh Lane, 2019–20. Kennedy Brown has work in the collection of the Irish Arts Council.

She also collaborated with Irish artist Jesse Jones for a project responding to the Repeal the 8th campaign, titled In the Shadow of the State.

In 2019 Browne created the public art commission, Public Feeling, for South Dublin County. "Sarah Browne’s Public Feeling explores the health impacts of austerity on the individual and collective body, the politics of “resilience”, and considers the gym or leisure centre as a space where the bodies of citizens are trained, transformed and cared for." Browne was included in the Limerick City Gallery of Art exhibition Irish Women Artists since 1984 and curated the TULCA Festival of Visual Arts, Galway in 2020.

Browne currently teaches sculpture at NCAD, Dublin.

== Bibliography ==
- Kennedy Browne and Michael Dempsey (Eds). The Redaction Trilogy, The Hugh Lane Gallery, Dublin, 2019.
- Luigi Fassi, Katerina Gregos, Steirischer Herbst (Ed.) Liquid Assets: In the Aftermath of the Transformation of Capital, Mousse Publishing, Milan, 2013.
- The Myth of the Many in the One, artist publication, cottagelab, 2013. ISBN 978-0-9554976-7-4
- Katarzyna Kosmala, 'Imagining Masculinities: Spatial and Temporal Representation and Visual Culture' in Routledge Advances in Feminist Studies and Intersectionality, Routledge, 2013. ISBN 978-0415807043
- Glenn Harper & Twylene Moyer (Ed.) Artists Reclaim the Commons: New Works / New Territories / New Publics (Perspectives on Contemporary Sculpture), ISC Press, 2013. ISBN 978-0295993393
- Kennedy Browne: IrelandVenice, monograph produced as part of the 53rd Venice Biennale, The Dock, 2009. ISBN 978-0-9553950-3-1
- How Capital Moves, artist publication, cottagelab, 2011.
- Browne, Sarah, et al. How to use fool's gold. Dublin: Project Press, 2011. ISBN 1904864759
- Daniel Birnbaum (Ed.), ‘Making Worlds/Fare Mondi’, official catalogue for the 53rd Biennale Di Venezia, Marsilio, 2009. ISBN 978-8831796965
- SPACE SHUTTLE. Six Projects of Urban Creativity and Social Interaction, PS², Belfast, 2007. ISBN 978-0-9555358-0-2
- EV+A give(a)way, Gandon Editions, Cork, 2004.

This article about an Irish artist is a stub. You can help Wikipedia by expanding it.
