= Ines Doujak =

Austrian artist

Ines Doujak (born 1959, Klagenfurt) is an Austrian artist. Doujak graduated from Hochschule für angewandte Kunst in Vienna. She had her first solo exhibition in 2002 at the Vienna Secession in 2002. as part of which she took part in the Rainbow Parade of that year, the Viennese counterpart to the Christopher Street Day, for which she designed a float. Since then has exhibited worldwide ever since working with a variety of media: collage, sculpture, photography, film, audio and installation.

== Solo Shows ==
The Württembergischer Kunstverein Stuttgart organized Not Dressed for Conquering in 2016–17 .

== Collections ==
Her work is included in the collection of the Reina Sofia Museum, the Kunstmuseum Linz., the MUMOK (Museum of Modern Art), Vienna, and the Österreichische Galerie Belvedere, Vienna
