= Garrett Phelan =

Irish artist

Garrett Phelan is an artist based in Dublin, Ireland. His works are site-specific projects that incorporate independent FM radio broadcasts, sculptural installations, photography, drawing, film, publications, text ephemera, and animation.

== Life and work ==
Phelan began producing art in 1994, working mainly in the area of Sound/Radio and Art from a visual arts perspective, but often incorporating photography and video. He co-produced the intermittent independent FM Art Radio station entitled A.A.R.T. – Radio in 1994. This was broadcast from the Irish Museum of Modern Art in a group survey exhibition entitled 'From Beyond the Pale'. He has continued to work independently on creating large scale FM/online radio broadcast experiments, other FM radio projects include; Black Brain Radio, HEED FM and FREE THOUGHT FM.

Since 1997 he has exhibited in Ireland and internationally, most recently at the Douglas Hyde Gallery, The National Gallery of Ireland. He has also exhibited at Proa Fundacion, Buenos Aires, Argentina; the 11th Lyon Biennial, France; 4th Auckland Triennial, New Zealand; SMART Project Space, Amsterdam; ICA, London; Fruitmarket Gallery, Edinburgh; Kunstverein, Hannover; Art Statements, Basel 39; Manifesta 5.

== Work Examples ==
- THE GOLDEN BANDSTAND - Sculpture
- FREE THOUGHT FM - Archive (2019)
- FREE THOUGHT FM, The Douglas Hyde Gallery, Dublin, Ireland (2019)
- I HAVE NO RIGHT TO BE SO NEAR, National Gallery of Ireland, Ireland (2017/2018)
- THE HIDE PROJECT, Fingal County Council, Dublin, Ireland (2017 -)
- HEED FM - ARCHIVE (2017)
- A VOODOO FREE PHENOMENON, The Project Arts Centre, Dublin, Ireland (2015)
- OUR UNION ONLY IN TRUTH, Temple Bar Gallery and Studios, Dublin, Ireland (2013)
- NEW FAITH LOVE SONG Irish Museum of Modern Art, Dublin, Ireland (2012)
