= Abigail Reynolds =

British artist

Abigail Reynolds (born 1970) is a British artist who lives in St Just, Cornwall, and has a studio at Porthmeor in St Ives. Reynolds studied at St Catherine's College, Oxford, Chelsea College of Arts, and Goldsmiths University. She is known for her work exploring the nature of time, with a range of media including collage using book plates, film, sculptural glass, and live performance work. In March 2016 she was awarded the BMW Art Journey prize at Art Basel. In 2020 she received a Paul Hamlyn Foundation award for visual art. Several of her works were selected for the British Art Show 9, touring 2021-22.

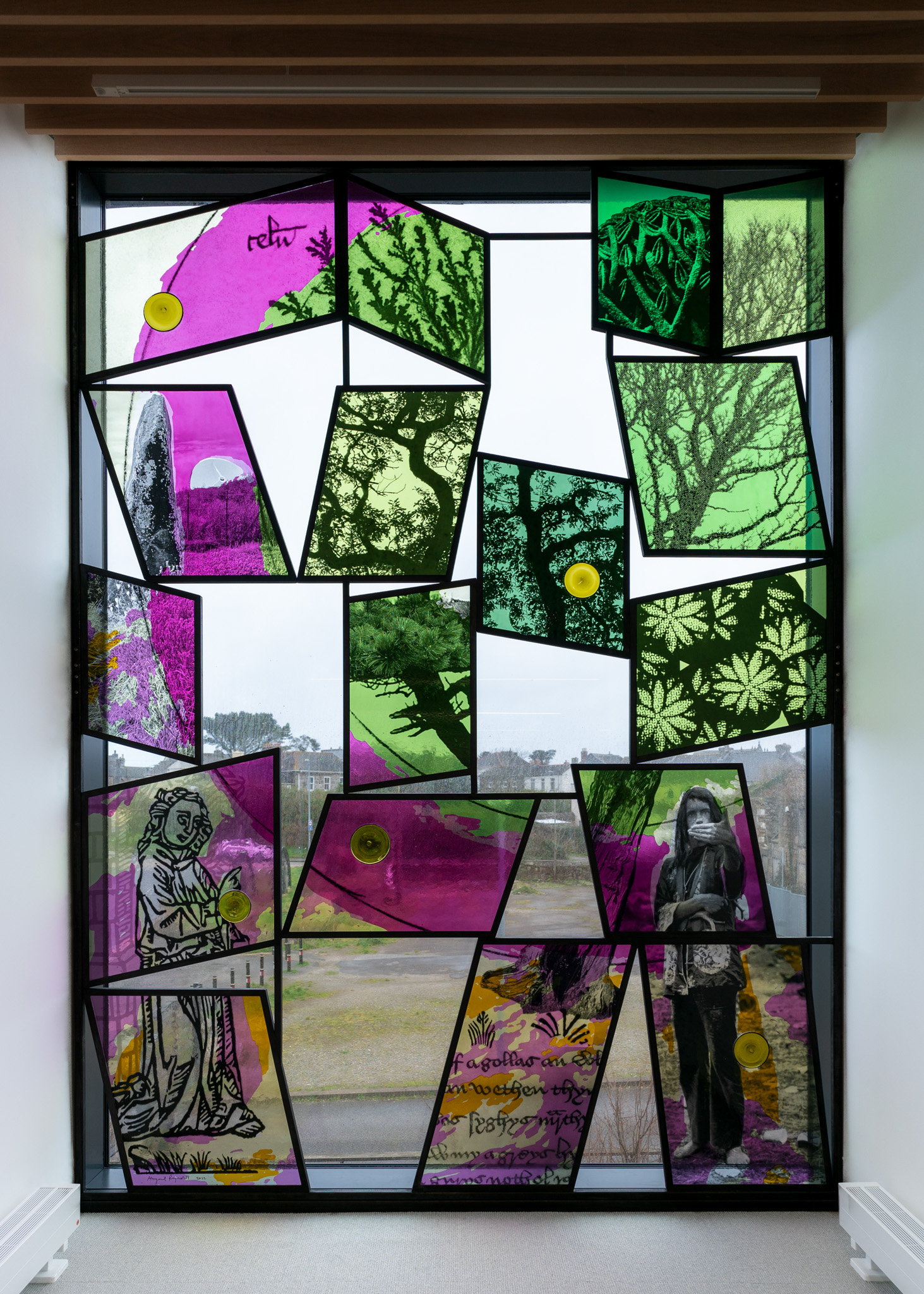
Abigail Reynolds, Tre, Kresen Kernow (2022)

== Career ==
In 2016 Reynolds was awarded the BMW Art Journey prize at Art Basel. As the third artist to undertake a BMW Art Journey, Reynolds spent five months visiting fifteen locations of Lost Libraries along the ancient Silk Road, filming historic sites in Italy, Egypt, Turkey, Uzbekistan, Iran and China with a Bolex camera on 16mm film. Reynolds' book titled Lost Libraries detailing her journey, was published by Hatje Cantz in Nov 2017.

From 2012 to 2014, Reynolds was the inaugural artist-in-residence at Rambert Dance Company, London.

In 2022 Reynolds was commissioned to make a permanent artwork for Kresen Kernow, the Cornish archive. Her window, Tre celebrates the narratives woven into the Cornish landscape over time. In 2019, Reynolds transformed the sand and seaweed of a single beach into glass, having seen a kelp burning pit on The Isles of Scilly. She created a permanent window work for the new Isles of Scilly museum using this glass in 2026. Her sculpture Trilobite can be seen at the Yorkshire Sculpture Park.

Reynolds has played an active role supporting the arts in Cornwall. She was commissioned by Tate St Ives to create a work to mark the opening of TSI2 (October 2017). This was a live work titled We Beat The Bounds. Her work is often formed in close dialogue with other disciplines; geologists, electronic music producers, palaeobiologists, librarians, brass bands.

Reynolds' work is held in the Arts Council Collection, the Government Art Collection, Yale University Art Gallery, New York Public Library and many private collections. Her monograph Walking A Cappella came out with Anomie Publishing in 2026.

Reynolds lectured for five years in contextual studies for the Fine Art program at Chelsea College of Art and Design in London, Reynolds taught in the sculpture department at the Ruskin School of Drawing and Fine Art, Oxford University from 2003 to 2010. This included curating a year-long interdisciplinary talks series titled 'Doubt' funded by the Gulbenkian Foundation.
