= List of Venice Biennale exhibitions =

This is a list of Venice Biennale exhibitions.

== Art ==
#	Dates	Arts director	Central exhibition/Theme	Awards	Ref
61st	2026	Koyo Kouoh	In Minor Keys		
60th	2024	Adriano Pedrosa	Foreigners Everywhere	Golden Lion for best artist of the exhibition: Mataaho Collective; Silver Lion for the most promising young artist of the exhibition: Karima Ashadu; Golden Lion for lifetime achievement: Anna Maria Maiolino, Nil Yalter; Golden Lion for best national participation: Australian pavilion with Archie Moore	
59th	2022	Cecilia Alemani	The Milk of Dreams	Golden Lion for best artist of the exhibition: Simone Leigh; Silver Lion for the most promising young artist of the exhibition: Ali Cherri; Golden Lion for lifetime achievement: Katharina Fritsch, Cecilia Vicuña; Golden Lion for best national participation: British pavilion with Sonia Boyce	
58th	2019	Ralph Rugoff	May You Live in Interesting Times	Golden Lion for best artist of the exhibition: Arthur Jafa; Silver Lion for the most promising young artist of the exhibition: Haris Epaminonda; Golden Lion for lifetime achievement: Jimmie Durham; Golden Lion for best national participation: Lithuanian pavilion with Lina Lapelytė, Vaiva Grainytė and Rugilė Barzdžiukaitė, Sun & Sea (Marina)	
57th	2017	Christine Macel	Viva Arte Viva	Golden Lion for best artist of the exhibition: Franz Erhard Walther; Silver Lion for a promising young participant: Hassan Khan; Special mentions: Charles Atlas and Petrit Halilaj; Golden Lion for lifetime achievement: Carolee Schneemann; Golden Lion for best national participation: German pavilion with Anne Imhof; Special mention as national participation: Brazilian pavilion with Cinthia Marcelle	
56th	2015	Okwui Enwezor	All the World's Futures	Golden Lion for best artist of the exhibition: Adrian Piper; Silver Lion for the most promising young artist of the exhibition: Im Heung-soon; Golden Lion for lifetime achievement: El Anatsui; Golden Lion for best national participation: Armenian pavilion	
55th	2013	Massimiliano Gioni	The Encyclopedic Palace	Golden Lion for best artist of the exhibition: Tino Sehgal; Silver Lion for the most promising young artist of main exhibition: Camille Henrot; Golden Lions for lifetime achievement: Marisa Merz and Maria Lassnig; Golden Lion for best national participation: Angolan pavilion	
54th	2011	Bice Curiger	ILLUMInations	Golden Lion for best artist of the exhibition: Christian Marclay; Silver Lion for the most promising young artist of the exhibition: Haroon Mirza; Golden Lions for lifetime achievement: Sturtevant and Franz West; Golden Lion for best national participation: German pavilion with Christoph Schlingensief	
53rd	2009	Daniel Birnbaum	Making Worlds	Golden Lion for best artist of the exhibition: Tobias Rehberger; Silver Lion for the most promising young artist of the exhibition: Nathalie Djurberg; Golden Lions for lifetime achievement: Yoko Ono and John Baldessari; Golden Lion for best national participation: American pavilion with Bruce Nauman	
52nd	2007	Robert Storr	Think with the Senses, Feel with the Mind	Golden Lion for an artist of the international exhibition: León Ferrari; Golden Lion for a young artist: Emily Jacir; Golden Lion for a critic or art historian for contributions to contemporary art: Benjamin H.D. Buchloh; Golden Lion for lifetime achievement: Malick Sidibé; Golden Lion for best national participation: Hungarian pavilion with Andreas Fogarasi	
51st	2005	Maria de Corral and Rosa Martinez		Golden Lion for lifetime achievement: Barbara Kruger; Golden Lion for best national participation: French pavilion with Annette Messager; Golden Lion from the international exhibition: Thomas Schütte; Golden Lion for a young artist (under 35): Regina José Galindo	
50th	2003	Francesco Bonami	Dreams and Conflicts: The Dictatorship of the Viewer	Golden Lion for lifetime achievement: Michelangelo Pistoletto and Carol Rama; Golden Lion for best national participation: Luxembourg (Su-Mei Tse); Golden Lion for best work shown: Peter Fischli and David Weiss; Golden Lion for artists less than 35 years old: Oliver Payne and Nick Relph; Golden Lion for young Italian female artist: Avish Khebrehzadeh	
49th	2001	Harald Szeemann	Plateau of Humankind	Golden Lion for lifetime achievement: Richard Serra and Cy Twombly; Golden Lion for best national participation: Germany; International Prize: Janet Cardiff and George Bures Miller, Marisa Merz, Pierre Huyghe; Special award: Yinka Shonibare, Tiong Ang, Samuel Beckett/Marin Karmitz, Juan Downey; Special awards for young artists: Federico Herrero, Anri Sala, John Pilson, Al-53167; Premia Fondazione Panathlon Domenico Chiesa: Urs Lüthi	
48th	1999	Harald Szeemann		Golden Lion for lifetime achievement: Louise Bourgeois and Bruce Nauman; Golden Lion for best national participation: Italy; International Prize: Doug Aitken, Cai Guo-Qiang, Shirin Neshat; Special Awards: Georges Adéagbo, Eija-Liisa Ahtila, Katarzyna Kozyra, Lee Bul; Premia Unesco for the promotion of the Arts: Ghada Amer	
47th	1997	Germano Celant		Golden Lion for lifetime achievement: Agnes Martin and Emilio Vedova; Golden Lion for best national participation: France; International Prize: Marina Abramović and Gerhard Richter; Premio 2000 (young artist): Douglas Gordon, Pipilotti Rist, Rachel Whiteread; Special awards: Thierry De Cordier, Marie-Ange Guilleminot, Ik-Joong Kang, Mariko Mori; Premia (purchase) Cassa di Risparmio Foundation: Tobias Rehberger; Premia giapponese Benesse: Alexandros Psychoulis; Premia Illycaffè: Sam Taylor-Wood	
46th	1995	Jean Clair		International Prizes: Golden Lion for painting – Ronald Kitaj; Golden Lion for sculpture – Gary Hill; Golden Lion for best national participation: Egypt; Premio 2000 (young artist): Kathy Prendergast; Special awards: Nunzio, Hiroshi Senju, Jehon Soo Cheon, Richard Kriesche; Premia (purchase) Cassa di Risparmio Foundation: Ignacio Iturria	
45th	1993	Achille Bonito Oliva		International Prize: Golden Lion for painting – ex aequo Richard Hamilton and Antoni Tàpies; Golden Lion for sculpture – Robert Willson; Golden Lion for best national representation: German pavilion with Hans Haacke and Nam June Paik; Premio 2000 (young artist): Matthew Barney; Special awards: Louise Bourgeois, Ilya Kabakov, Joseph Kosuth, Jean Pierre Raynaud; Premia Giulio Carlo Argan for the critics: David Sylvester; Premia Gian Tomaso Liverani: Eva Marisaldi; Premia (purchase) Fondazione Marino Marini: Luca Quartana; Premia Swatch: Yukinori Yanagi	
44th	1990	Giovanni Carandente		International Prize: Golden Lion – Giovanni Anselmo; Golden Lion for sculpture – Bernd and Hilla Becher; Golden Lion for best national representation: American pavilion with Jenny Holzer; Premio 2000 (young artist): Anish Kapoor; Premia (purchase) of the Cassa di Risparmio di Venezia: Giuseppe Pulvirenti	
43rd	1988	Giovanni Carandente		International Prize/Golden Lion: Jasper Johns; Golden Lion for best national participation: Italian pavilion; Premio 2000 (young artist): Barbara Bloom	
42nd	1986	Giovanni Carandente		International Prize/Golden Lion: Frank Auerbach and Sigmar Polke; Golden Lion for best national representation: French pavilion with Daniel Buren; Premio 2000 (young artist): Nunzio Di Stefano; Golden Lion in memory of sculptor Fausto Melotti	
41st	1984	Maurizio Calvesi		None (Note: The Grandi Premi re-instituted in 1986 were the first since 1968. They included the Golden Lion (Leone d’Oro), Premio 2000/Duemila for a young artist, and the Premio dei Paesi Golden Lion for the best national pavilion.)	–
40th	1982	Sisto Dalla Palma		None	–
39th	1980	Luigi Carluccio		None	–
38th	1978	Luigi Scarpa		None	–
37th	1976	Vittorio Gregotti		None	–
36th	1972	Mario Penelope	Opera o Comportamento (Work or Behavior)	None	–
35th	1970	Umbro Apollonio	–	None	–
34th	1968	Gian Alberto Dell'Acqua	–	Gran Premi (Grand Prize): British painter Bridget Riley, French sculptor Nicolas Schöffer, German etcher Horst Janssen, and Italian sculptors Gianni Colombo and Pino Pascali	
33rd	1966	Gian Alberto Dell'Acqua	–	Gran Premi (Grand Prize): Argentine painter Julio Le Parc, Danish sculptor Robert Jacobsen ex aequo with Étienne Martin (France), Japanese etcher Masuo Ikeda, and Italians painter Lucio Fontana, sculptor Alberto Viani, and etcher Ezio Gribaudo	
32nd	1964	Gian Alberto Dell'Acqua	–	Gran Premi (Grand Prize): American painter Robert Rauschenberg, Swiss sculptor Zoltan Kemeny, German draughtsman Joseph Fassbender, and Italians sculptor Andrea Cascella, sculptor Arnaldo Pomodoro, and etcher Angelo Savelli.	
31st	1962	Gian Alberto Dell'Acqua	–	Gran Premi (Grand Prize): French painter Alfred Manessier, Swiss sculptor Alberto Giacometti, Argentine etcher Antonio Berni, and Italians painter Giuseppe Gapogrossi ex aequo with Ennio Morlotti, sculptor Aldo Calò ex aequo with Umberto Milani, and etcher Antonino Virduzzo	
30th	1960	Gian Alberto Dell'Acqua	–	Gran Premi (Grand Prize): French painter Jean Fautrier, German painter Hans Hartung, Italian painter Emilio Vedova, and Italian sculptor Pietro Consagra.	
29th	1958	Gian Alberto Dell'Acqua	–	Gran Premi (Grand Prize): American painter Mark Tobey, Spanish sculptor Eduardo Chillida, Brazilian etcher Fayga Ostrower, Italians painter Osvaldo Licini, sculptor Umberto Mastroianni, and etcher Luigi Spacal	
28th	1956	Rodolfo Pallucchini	–	Gran Premi (Grand Prize): French painter Jacques Villon, British sculptor Lynn Chadwick, Japanese etcher Shiko Munakata, Brazilian draughtsman Aldemir Martins, and Italians painter Afro, sculptor Emilio Greco, etcher Zoran Music, and draughtsperson Carlo Mattioli ex aequo with Anna Salvatore	
27th	1954	Rodolfo Pallucchini	–	Gran Premi (Grand Prize): German painter Max Ernst, French sculptor Jean Arp, Spanish etcher Joan Miró, and Italians painter Giuseppe Santomaso, sculptor Pericle Fazzini, and etcher Paolo Manaresi ex aequo with Cesco Magnolato	
26th	1952	Rodolfo Pallucchini	–	Gran Premi (Grand Prize): French painter Raoul Dufy, American sculptor Alexander Calder, German etcher Emil Nolde, and Italians painter Bruno Cassinari ex aequo with Bruno Saetti, sculptor Marino Marini, and etcher Tono Zancanaro	
25th	1950	Rodolfo Pallucchini	–	Gran Premi (Grand Prize): French painter Henri Matisse, French sculptor Ossip Zadkine, Belgian etcher Frans Masereel, Italians painter Carlo Carrà, sculptor Marcello Mascherini ex aequo with Luciano Minguzzi, and etcher Giuseppe Viviani	
24th	1948	Rodolfo Pallucchini	–	Gran Premi (Grand Prize): French painter Georges Braque, British sculptor Henry Moore, French etcher Marc Chagall, and Italians painter Giorgio Morandi, sculptor Giacomo Manzù, and etcher Mino Maccari	
23rd	1942	Antonio Maraini	–	Gran Premi (Grand Prize): Hungarian painter Arthur Kampf, Swiss sculptor Charles Otto Bänninger, Swedish etcher Stif Borglind, and Italians painter Alberto Salietti, sculptor Francesco Messina, and etcher Luigi Bartolini	
22nd	1940	Antonio Maraini	–	Gran Premi (Grand Prize): Hungarian painter Vilmos Aba Novàk, German sculptor Arno Breker, Belgian etcher Maurice Brocas, and Italians painter Felice Carena, sculptor Guido Galletti, and etcher Marcello Boglione	
21st	1938	Antonio Maraini	–	Gran Premi (Grand Prize): Spanish painter Ignacio Zuloaga, Swiss sculptor Herman Hubacher, British etcher Blair Hughes-Stanton, and Italians painter Felice Casorati, sculptor Venanzio Crocetti, and etcher Mario Delitala	
20th	1936	Antonio Maraini	–		–
19th	1934	Antonio Maraini	–		–
18th	1932	Antonio Maraini	–		–
17th	1930	Antonio Maraini	–		–
16th	1928	Antonio Maraini	–		–
15th	1926	Vittorio Pica	–		–
14th	1924	Vittorio Pica	–		–
13th	1922	Vittorio Pica	–		–
12th	1920	Vittorio Pica	–		–
11th	1914	Antonio Fradeletto	–		–
10th	1912	Antonio Fradeletto	–		–
9th	1910	Antonio Fradeletto	–		–
8th	1909	Antonio Fradeletto	–		–
7th	1907	Antonio Fradeletto	–		–
6th	1905	Antonio Fradeletto	–		–
5th	1903	Antonio Fradeletto	–		–
4th	1901	Antonio Fradeletto	–		–
3rd	1899	Antonio Fradeletto	–		–
2nd	1897	Antonio Fradeletto	–		–
1st	1895	Antonio Fradeletto	–		–

== Bibliography ==
- Di Martino, Enzo (2005). The History of the Venice Biennale 1895–2005. Venice: Papiro Arte. ISBN 978-88-901104-4-3. OCLC 62237064.
- Vetrocq, Marcia E. (September 2005). "Venice Biennale: Be Careful What You Wish For". Art in America. 93 (8): 108–168. ISSN 0004-3214 – via EBSCOhost.
