= Kenzo Okada =

Japanese-American artist

- Born: September 28, 1902; Yokohama, Japan
- Died: July 25, 1982 (aged 79); Tokyo, Japan
- Known for: Painting
- Movement: Abstract expressionism, color field
- Patrons: Betty Parsons

Kenzo Okada (岡田 謙三, Okada Kenzō; born on September 28, 1902, died on July 25, 1982) was a Japanese-born American painter and the first Japanese-American artist working in the Abstract Expressionist style to receive international acclaim. At the 29th Venice Biennale in 1958, Okada’s work was exhibited in the Japan Pavilion and he won the Astorre Meyer Prize and UNESCO Prize.

Okada's work has been featured in retrospective exhibitions since the 1960s, including the Albright-Knox Art Gallery in 1965, the National Museum of Modern Art, Kyoto in 1966, the Seibu Museum of Art, Tokyo in 1982, the Museum of Modern Art, Toyama in 1989, the University of Iowa Museum of Art in 2000, and the Yokohama Museum of Art in 2003. Okada’s works are also held in major American museum collections including the Metropolitan Museum of Art, the Museum of Modern Art, New York, the National Gallery of Art, Washington, D.C., the Philadelphia Museum of Art, the San Francisco Museum of Modern Art, the Solomon R. Guggenheim Museum, the Whitney Museum of American Art, among others.

== Biography ==
Turn by Kenzo Okada, 1962, Honolulu Museum of Art

=== Early life and education (1902–1927) ===
Okada was born September 28, 1902, in Yokohama, Japan. His father, a wealthy industrialist, did not support his son's desire to be an artist. When his father died, Okada entered the department of Western painting at Tokyo School of Fine Arts (present Tokyo National University of Fine Arts and Music). His classmates include Gen'ichirō Inokuma, Takeo Yamaguchi, and Ryōhei Koiso. In 1924, Okada dropped out from Tokyo School of Fine Arts and left for Paris where he studied with fellow Japanese expatriate Tsuguharu Foujita, executing paintings of urban subjects. In 1927, he exhibited work in the Salon d'Automne.

=== Early career in Japan (1927–1950) ===
In 1927, Okada returned to Japan and within a year he had his first one-person show at the Mitsukoshi Department Store in Tokyo. In 1929, his works were selected for the sixteenth Second Section Exhibition (Nika-ten 二科展), an annual salon organized by the modernist artist association Second Section Society (Nika-kai 二科会). Thereafter, Okada's works were displayed in the Second Section Exhibition every year. Okada became popular in the Second Section Society for his luscious portraits of women and landscapes of French cityscapes. In 1937, the Second Section Society admitted Okada's (along with Tamiji Kitagawa, Keiji Shimazaki, Kōnosuke Tamura, and among others) full membership. Throughout the 1930s, Okada's style gradually changed from the warm tones reminiscent of Marie Laurencin and Henri Matisse immediately after his return to Japan to the distinctive surface in cold colour, which were created by applying layers of colour, and motifs reminiscent of downtown Paris, such as girls and flower sellers. Okada's success continued and he was awarded the Showa Western Painting Encouragement Prize (昭和洋画奨励賞) in 1939. In the same year he was also invited to teach oil painting at the School of Fine Arts of the Nihon University with Kinosuke Ebihara and other oil painters. Later, Okada was evacuated to Miyagi Prefecture.

After the war, Okada quickly returned to the reconstructed Second Section Society and began to work again on the figurative groups of nude/clothed women that he had worked on before the war. In 1947, he was awarded the first Group Membership Effort Prize (会員努力賞) from the Second Section Society and attracted attention for his refined, lyrical style. From that year, he began teaching oil painting at the Musashino Art University and at the Tama Art University, and training younger artists. As Okada's reputation in the art world grew again, he was increasingly busy with illustrations and cover paintings for newspapers and magazines. Under these circumstances, his style gradually changed. From 1947 onwards, the shapes of figures and objects that compose his pictures gradually became simpler. Okada himself later suggested that the reason behind this stylistic change was a sense of powerlessness and mistrust of his own skills and techniques, which he had developed up to that point. Okada became aware of the deadlock in his own creation and sought a change in the environment, which led him to the US in 1950.

=== Success as an abstract painter in the United States (1950–1982) ===
In 1950, Okada moved to New York City. What awaited him there was Abstract Expressionism, which was then sweeping the American art world. Later Okada recalled that at first he could not understand Abstract Expressionism at all. Okada was rather confused by the works he saw, and spent nearly three years after his arrival in the US in a state of uncertainty. After a period of trial and error, Okada developed a technique of wiping off the paint and applying a layer of loosely dissolved paint to the surface of the painting to create an abstract painting with a unique texture and a poetic, lyrical quality. The art dealer Betty Parsons, who was promoting Abstract Expressionist painters such as Jackson Pollock, Mark Rothko, and Barnett Newman, visited Okada's studio in 1952, recognised his talent, and supported him for the next 30 years. In 1953, Parsons mounted Okada's first New York solo show at her Betty Parsons Gallery. Okada's works exhibited at the Betty Parsons Gallery attracted much attention and were soon added to the collections of major museums in New York such as the Metropolitan Museum of Art, the Museum of Modern Art, New York, and the Solomon R. Guggenheim Museum, establishing Okada's firm reputation on the New York art scene. Moreover, through Parsons, Okada gained access to the inner circle of Abstract Expressionism. Okada became friends with Rothko, Newman, and many other Abstract Expressionists. The American artist Michelle Stuart wrote: "when Okada came to the United States he was already a mature painter, well considered in his native Japan. To American abstraction Okada brought civilized restraint, an elegance of device and an unusual gift for poetic transmutation of natural forms."

At the 29th Venice Biennale in 1958, Okada’s work was exhibited in the Japan Pavilion (representative: Shūzō Takiguchi; assistant commissioner: Ichirō Fukuzawa and Yoshiaki Tōno) alongside that of five other Japanese artists (Ichirō Fukuzawa, Kawabata Ryūshi, Seison Maeda, Yoshi Kinouchi, Shindō Tsuji), and Okada won Astorre Meyer Prize and UNESCO Prize. After the 29th Venice Biennale, Okada spent increasing time in Japan.

Okada's style and colours, which evoke the aesthetics of traditional Japanese art, were popularised under the name of Yugenism (ユーゲニズム; 幽玄主義), and he achieved great commercial and critical success as a Japanese-American artist in New York. His paintings from the 1950s and 1960s reveal subtle changes in the natural world through the use of imagery constructed with delicate, sensitive color tonalities, floating within the compositional space. Turn from 1962, in the collection of the Honolulu Museum of Art, and Hagoromo from 1966, in the Governor Nelson A. Rockefeller Empire State Plaza Art Collection, are examples of the artist's tonal abstractions. During the 1970s he painted numerous works that used as a point of departure the reinterpretation of the decorative effects of traditional Japanese painting. Okada evokes the aura of landscape by using earth colors, abstract patterns hinting at rocks and flowers, and an overall haziness that makes his scenes look submerged in water. Bringing traditions of Japanese art to the New York School of abstraction, Okada distills the essence of nature into his painting, making it seem elemental and thus sublime. His sensitive and personal style of abstract expressionism, with elements inspired by Japanese art, relates directly to both color field painting and lyrical abstraction. The art historian Bert Winther-Tamaki points out that "The painting he did in Japan before 1950 was figuratibe and bore a close resemblance to styles of the École de Paris. But after the move to New York, his painting became abstract and took on what people perceived to be a Japanese appearance, owing to its stylistic 'yugenism' buttressed by an occasional Japanese title or the vestige of some motif such as a fan shape or a vertical division reminiscent of the seam of a folding screen." Furthermore, Winther-Tamaki observes that "the affirmation of national identity provided a status for Okada in an international context of art that would withstand comparison with American artists."

=== Legacy ===
Okada died in Tokyo July 24, 1982. The artist’s widow Okada Kimi donated 95 of the artist’s paintings to Akita City in June, 1989. In November, 1989, the Akita Senshu Museum of Art opened the Kenzo Okada Memorial (岡田謙三記念館), the special exhibition room that displays Okada’s oeuvre permanently. In 1997, Okada Kimi donated 152 paintings to the Kitasato Institute, Tokyo which now exhibits Okada’s works regularly at its Kitasato University Medical Center Ōmura Memorial Hall (北里大学メディカルセンター 大村記念館) in Saitama.

Okada's works were featured in the 1997 landmark world-touring exhibition Asian Traditions/Modern Expressions which made ground-breaking contributions to knowledge about Asian American art history. Subsequently, his works were discussed in the multi-author volume Asian American Art: A History, 1850-1970 (2008), which was the first comprehensive study on Asian American art history. Ultimately, in 2022, the New York State Capitol held the exhibition Isamu Noguchi & Kenzo Okada to celebrate Asian American & Pacific Islander Heritage Month. The exhibition "highlight[ed] how their East Asian heritage helped shape postwar American art."

== Selected exhibitions ==
=== Solo exhibitions ===
- 1953 Betty Parsons Gallery, New York
- 1955 Betty Parsons Gallery, New York
- 1956 Betty Parsons Gallery, New York
- 1958 Nihonbashi Takashimaya Department Store, Tokyo
- 1959 Betty Parsons Gallery, New York
- 1962 Betty Parsons Gallery, New York
- 1963 New Gallery, Hayden Library, Massachusetts Institute of Technology
- 1964 Betty Parsons Gallery, New York
- 1965 Kenzo Okada Paintings, 1931–1965, Albright-Knox Art Gallery, Buffalo Fine Arts Academy, Buffalo
- 1966 Nihonbashi Takashimaya Department Store, Tokyo
- 1966–1967 Kenzo Okada Paintings, 1952–1965, the National Museum of Modern Art, Kyoto, the Honolulu Academy of Arts, the M.H. de Young Memorial Museum, San Francisco, and the University Art Museum, University of Texas, Austin
- 1967 Betty Parsons Gallery, New York
- 1969 Betty Parsons Gallery, New York
- 1971 Betty Parsons Gallery, New York
- 1973 Betty Parsons Gallery, New York
- 1976 Betty Parsons Gallery, New York
- 1978 Betty Parsons Gallery, New York
- 1982 Kenzo Okada (岡田謙三展： ニューヨークに花開く幽玄の美), Seibu Museum of Art, Tokyo, and Fukuoka Art Museum
- 1989 Kenzo Okada (岡田謙三展), the Museum of Modern Art, Toyama, the Meguro Museum of Art, Tokyo, the Gunma Prefectural Museum of Modern Art, the Ohara Museum of Art, Kurashiki, the Mie Prefectural Art Museum, the Kure Municipal Museum of Art, and the Akita City Museum of Art
- 2000 Kenzo Okada: A Retrospective of the American Years 1950–1982, University of Iowa Museum of Art, Iowa
- 2003 Kenzo Okada: A Retrospective (生誕100年記念・没後20年: 岡田謙三展), Yokohama Museum of Art, the Akita Senshu Museum of Art, the Kobe City Koiso Memorial Museum of Art, and the Joshibi Art Museum, Joshibi University of Art and Design, Sagamihara

=== Group exhibitions ===
- 1954 Young American Painters, Solomon R. Guggenheim Museum, New York
- 1955 3rd São Paulo Biennale
- 1958 29th Venice Biennale
- 1979 Okada, Shinoda, and Tsutaka: Three Pioneers of Abstract Painting in 20th Century Japan, The Phillips Collection, Washington, D.C.
- 1994－1995 Japanese Art After 1945: Scream Against the Sky, Yokohama Museum of Art, Guggenheim Museum SoHo, and San Francisco Museum of Modern Art

== Major public collections ==
- Akita Senshu Museum of Art
- Art Institute of Chicago
- Albright-Knox Art Gallery, Baffalo
- Brooklyn Museum, New York
- Bruce Museum, Greenwich
- Fukuoka Art Museum
- Harvard Art Museums/Fogg Museum
- Indianapolis Museum of Art
- Kitasato Institute, Tokyo
- Meguro Museum of Art, Tokyo
- Museum of Contemporary Art Tokyo
- Metropolitan Museum of Art, New York
- Museum of Fine Arts, Boston
- Museum of Modern Art, Kamakura & Hayama
- Museum of Modern Art, New York
- National Gallery of Art, Washington, D.C.
- National Museum of Art, Osaka
- National Museum of Modern Art, Kyoto
- National Museum of Modern Art, Tokyo
- Neuberger Museum of Art, New York
- Peggy Guggenheim Collection, Venice
- Philadelphia Museum of Art
- Phillips Collection, Washington, D.C.
- San Francisco Museum of Modern Art
- Santa Barbara Museum of Art
- Smithsonian American Art Museum, Washington, D.C.
- Solomon R. Guggenheim Museum, New York
- Sompo Museum of Art, Tokyo
- St. Louis Museum of Art
- Whitney Museum of American Art, New York
- Yale University Art Gallery, New Haven
- Yokohama Museum of Art
