= 45th Venice Biennale =

- Genre: Art exhibition
- Begins: June 13, 1993
- Ends: October 13, 1993
- Location: Venice
- Country: Italy
- Previous event: 44th Venice Biennale (1990)
- Next event: 46th Venice Biennale (1995)

The 45th Venice Biennale, held from June 13 to October 13, 1993, was an exhibition of international contemporary art, with 45 participating nations. The Venice Biennale takes place biennially in Venice, Italy. Prizewinners of the 45th Biennale included: ex aequo Richard Hamilton and Antoni Tàpies (Golden Lion for painting), Robert Willson (Golden Lion for sculpture), the German pavilion with Hans Haacke and Nam June Paik (best national representation), and Matthew Barney (Premio 2000 for young artists).

== Awards ==
- La Biennale di Venezia International Prizes:
  - Golden Lion for painting: ex aequo Richard Hamilton and Antoni Tàpies
  - Golden Lion for sculpture: Robert Wilson
- Golden Lion for best national representation: German Pavilion with Hans Haacke and Nam June Paik
- Premio 2000 (young artist; also called Duemila Prize): Matthew Barney
- Special awards (also called Honourable Mention): Louise Bourgeois, Ilya Kabakov, Joseph Kosuth, Jean Pierre Raynaud
- Premia Giulio Carlo Argan for the critics: David Sylvester
- Premia Gian Tomaso Liverani: Eva Marisaldi
- Premia (purchase) Fondazione Marino Marini: Luca Quartana
- Premia Swatch: Yukinori Yanagi

== Bibliography ==
- Di Martino, Enzo (2005). The History of the Venice Biennale 1895–2005. Venice: Papiro Arte. ISBN 978-88-901104-4-3. OCLC 62237064.
