= Nicolaus Schafhausen =

German curator

Nicolaus Schafhausen (born 1965) is a German curator, director, author, and editor of numerous publications on contemporary art. Since 2012 he has been the Strategic Director of Fogo Island Arts, an initiative of the Canadian Shorefast Foundation to find alternative solutions for the revitalization of the area that is prone to emigration. Schafhausen is also a Visiting Lecturer at HISK, Higher Institute of Fine Arts, Gent.

== Career ==
Schafhausen co-curated the 6th Moscow Biennale in 2015. He has curated a number of international festivals and exhibitions such as "Media City" Seoul 2010, or the "Dutch House" for Expo 2010 in Shanghai. In 2007 and 2009 he was the curator of the German Pavilion for the 52nd and 53rd Venice Biennale, and for the 56th Venice Biennale in 2015 he curated the Kosovo Pavilion.

In addition to curating exhibitions, national pavilions and other curatorial projects, Schafhausen has led institutions such as the Frankfurter Kunstverein, the Künstlerhaus Stuttgart, and the Witte de With Center for Contemporary Art in Rotterdam. He was the founding Director of the European Kunsthalle, conceived as a project to examine the conditions and structures of contemporary art institutions, independent of local government mandates. From 2012 to 2019, he was the Director of Kunsthalle Wien.

In March 2023 it was announced that Schafhausen would open a commercial gallery in Brussels, Belgium in April of the same year under the name KIN Gallery.

He was born in Düsseldorf.
