= Palazzo Massari =

Building in Ferrara, Italy

Coordinates: 44.8421°N 11.6248°E

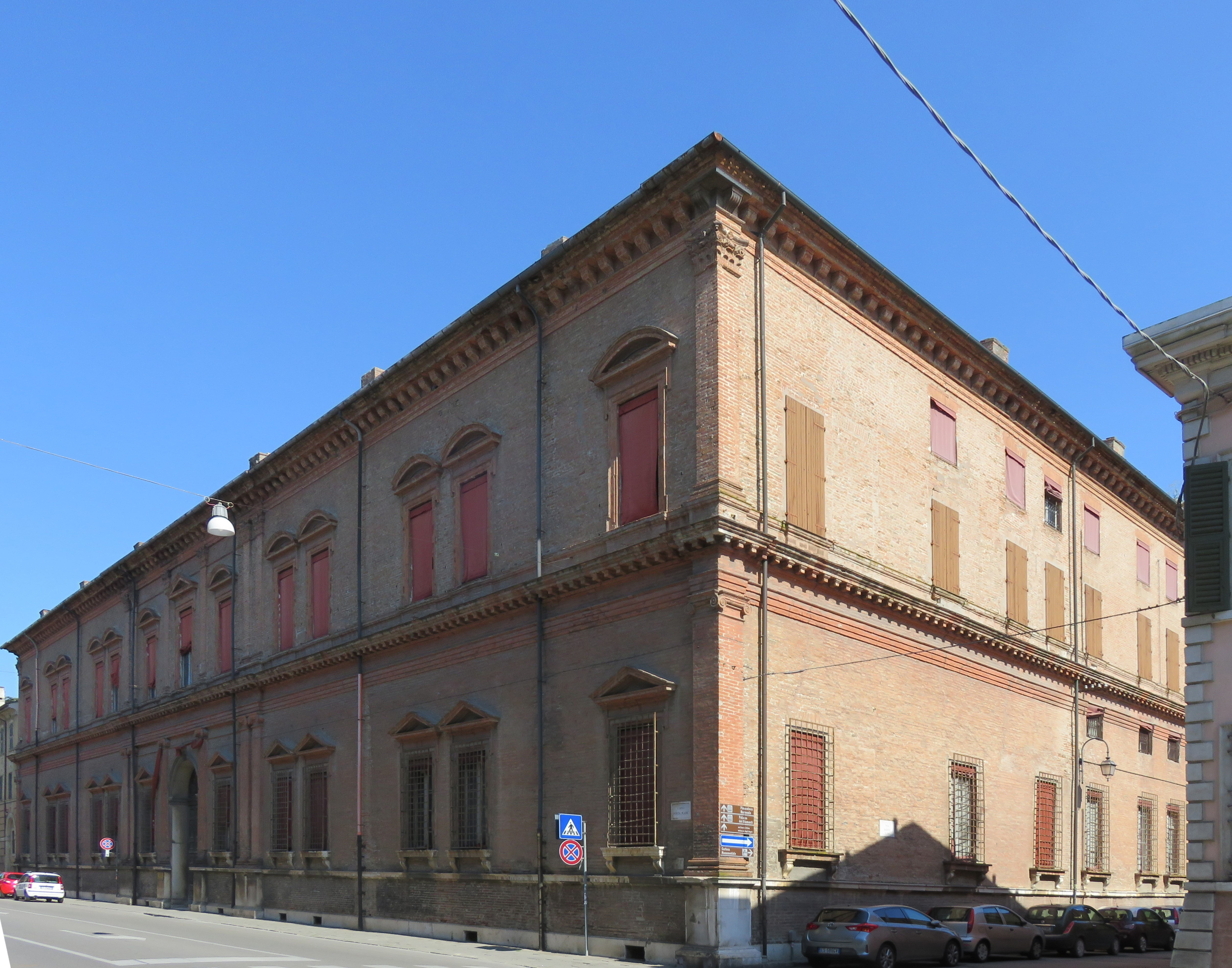
Palazzo Massari, Ferrara

The Palazzo Massari, also known as the Palazzo Rosso, is a Renaissance-style palace located on Borso and Corso Porta Mare, at the northwest corner of Piazza Ariostea, in Ferrara, region of Emilia-Romagna, Italy.

== History ==
Built in late 1591, commissioned by Count Onofrio Bevilacqua from Alberto Schiatti, the palace has a two-story, sober classical facade with twin windows separated by pilasters, Ionic on ground floor and Corinthian on the second floor. In the 1780s, the smaller Palazzina Bianca (in contrast to the larger "pink palazzo"), also known as the Palazzina dei Cavalieri di Malta, was built adjacent to the other palace. In addition, a Neoclassical pavilion designed by Luigi Cosimo Bertelli, called the Coffee House, was added.

In the 19th century, the palace became property of the Massari family, who then sold it to the Comune of Ferrara. Since 1975, it has housed the Museum of Modern and Contemporary Art of the city. It now also houses the collections of three other museums: Museo Giovanni Boldini, Museo dell'Ottocento, and Museo d'Arte Moderna e Contemporanea "Filippo de Pisis".

The gardens belonging to the palace were landscaped by Luigi Cosimo Bertelli in the 18th century as formal Italian gardens; in the 19th century Count Massari turned them into a less formal English garden. Since the 1970s, the gardens adjacent to the Palazzo Massari host outdoor modern sculptures. Among the works and artists displayed are:

- Grande Musa (1986) by Maurizio Bonora
- Struttura by Sinisca
- Abbraccio (1986) by Mario Piva
- Falath (1984) by Agapito Miniucchi
- Donna-reperto (1983) by Roberto Gramigna
- Amplesso I (1973-1974) by Rita da Re
- Struttura (after 1985) by Laura Rivalta
- Monument to Unknown Painter (c. 1972-1985) by Man Ray
- Spirale in progressione (1968-72) by Carmelo Cappello
- Nudo di donna in piedi and Nudo di donna seduta by Filippo Tallone
- Elemento Modulato (1970) by Aldo Calo
- Guerriero (1959) by Mirko Basaldella
- Ragazzo che si sveste (1980) by Augusto Murer
- Bove (c. 1970) by Emilio Greco
- San Francesco (1956) by Marcello Mascherini
