= 54th Venice Biennale =

Art exhibition in 2011

- Genre: Art exhibition
- Begins: 2011
- Ends: 2011
- Location: Venice
- Country: Italy
- Previous event: 53rd Venice Biennale (2009)
- Next event: 55th Venice Biennale (2013)

The 54th Venice Biennale was an international contemporary art exhibition held in 2011. The Venice Biennale takes place biennially in Venice, Italy. Artistic director Bice Curiger curated its central exhibition, "ILLUMInations".

== Awards ==
- Golden Lion for best artist of the exhibition: Christian Marclay
- Silver Lion for the most promising young artist of the exhibition: Haroon Mirza
- Golden Lions for lifetime achievement: Sturtevant and Franz West
- Golden Lion for best national participation: German pavilion with Christoph Schlingensief
