= Fondation Vincent van Gogh Arles =

Art museum in France

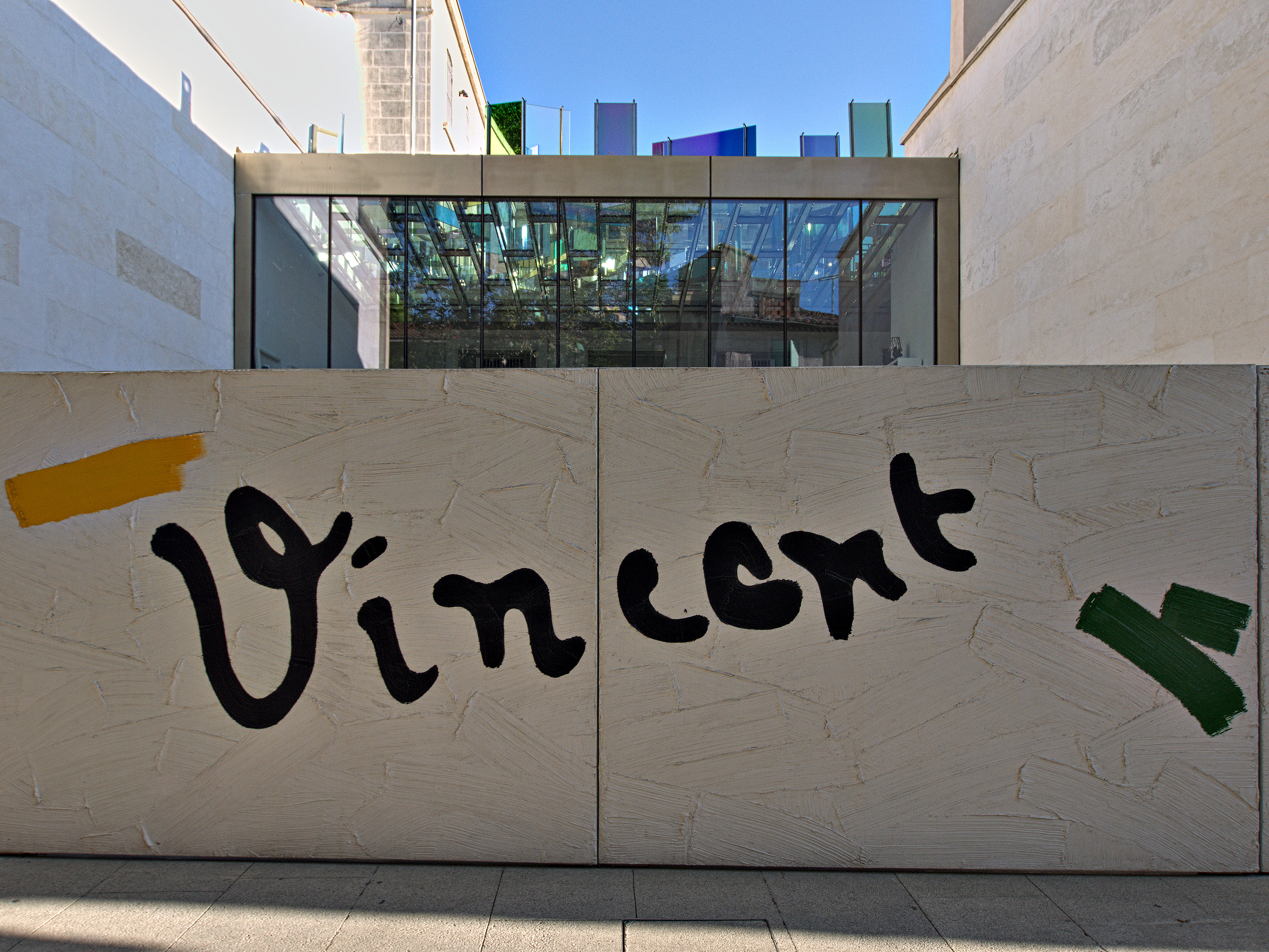
- Location: Arles
- Coordinates: 43°40′41″N 4°37′32″E
- Type: Foundation
- Founder: Yolande Clergue
- Website: www.fondation-vincentvangogh-arles.org/en/foundation/

The Fondation Vincent van Gogh Arles (English: Vincent van Gogh Arles Foundation) is a non-profit foundation and contemporary art museum located in Arles, France, dedicated to the work and legacy of Vincent van Gogh. Its goal is to generate and promote cultural and artistic activities with reference to the oeuvre of van Gogh as related to the time he spent in Arles, and the intention that van Gogh expressed in establishing an international center of artistic creation and exchange in Arles. The artistic director is editor-in-chief of Parkett, Bice Curiger.

== History ==
In 1983 Yolande Clergue, a curator married to the photographer Lucien Clergue, founded the Association for the Creation of the Fondation Van Gogh (subsequently known simply as the Fondation Van Gogh).

In 1985 Yolande Clergue proposed initiating a collection of works executed by contemporary artists in tribute to Van Gogh, including Francis Bacon. Bacon responded enthusiastically by producing a painting specifically for the foundation. More than ninety artists chose to contribute to this homage to Vincent van Gogh.

In 2008 Yolande Clergue’s original ambition to create a Fondation Van Gogh was given new momentum by Luc Hoffmann who established a permanent framework for activities designed to preserve the memory of Van Gogh in Arles and to foster contemporary art. The museum now owns a contemporary art collection. This new foundation was officially established in 2010, under the name of the Fondation Vincent van Gogh Arles. It is now located in the Hôtel Léautaud de Donines.

== Foundation Board ==
- Maja Hoffmann, chairman
- Yvon Lambert, vice-chairman
- Mustapha Bouhayati
- Kasia Barbotin-Larrieu
- The Ministry of the Interior or his·her representative
- The Ministry of Culture and Communication or his representative
- The Mayor of Arles
