= Tate Etc. =

UK magazine

- Editor: Simon Grant (2004-2021)
- Categories: art magazines
- Frequency: 3 a year
- Founder: Simon Grant, Bice Curiger
- First issue: May 2004
- Company: Tate
- Country: United Kingdom
- Based in: London
- Language: English
- Website: www.tate.org.uk/tate-etc
- ISSN: 1743-8853

Tate Etc. is an arts magazine produced within Britain's Tate organisation of arts and museums. It has the largest circulation of any art magazine in the world. The magazine was edited by Simon Grant from its launch in 2004 until the Autumn 2021 issue. As well as being sold in shops, the magazine is sent for free to Tate members.

== History ==
Prior to the 2004 launch of Tate Etc. the Tate published a magazine for its members. In 2002 the Tate's magazine was taken over by Condé Nast, who relaunched it as a bi-monthly general arts magazine which would, for the first time, carry consumer advertising. The magazine was brought back in house in 2004 as Tate Etc, Founded by Simon Grant and Bice Curiger. Tate Etc. first appeared in the Summer of 2004, and issues have been produced 3 times a year.

In 2007, then-art director Cornel Windlin spoke about the relative freedom afforded to the editorial team at Tate Etc due to the fact that the magazine was sent to Tate members, and so there was less pressure to sell on newsstands. This influenced the cover design, with more prominence given to text and less on eye-grabbing images on the magazine's covers during that time.

In 2017 the magazine was redesigned, partly to emphasise its independence and make it look more distinct from Tate's marketing materials. In 2018 the magazine launched a digital edition.

Founding editor Simon Grant's final issue working on the magazine was the Autumn 2021 issue.
