= Sarah Maria Griffin =

Irish writer, poet, zinester and podcaster

- Born: 28 January 1988 (age 38); Dublin, Ireland
- Education: Manor House School, Raheny; IADT Dún Laoghaire; NUI Galway
- Years active: 2009–present
- Website: sarahmariagriff.com

Sarah Maria Griffin (born 28 January 1988) is an Irish writer and poet, podcaster, and producer of zines. She is the author of a volume each of poetry and essays, and three novels.

== Writing career ==
Griffin developed an interest in writing as a teen. Her first book was a collection, Follies (Belfast: Lapwing, 2011), primarily of poems, with a few short prose pieces. In the same period, mid-2011, a play by Griffin, Sleep skips my heart, was performed in a short run at the Town Hall Theatre in Galway.

She expanded into writing articles for newspapers and other media outlets, including BuzzFeed and The Guardian, and the online current affairs and investigative journal, the Dublin Inquirer. Her non-fiction has also appeared in works including Guts, The Stinging Fly, The Rumpus and Winter Pages.

She was invited to co-edit the Bare Hands online poetry magazine by its founder, fellow poet Kerrie O'Brien, and they issued monthly "runs" of the journal. In 2012, a print collection of Bare Hands poetry and photography, with works by more than 25 poets and 15 photographers, was published.

Not Lost: A Story About Leaving Home, was published by New Island Books in Dublin in 2013, and comprises articles written in San Francisco, primarily on aspects of emigrant life during her first year there.

Griffin's first novel, Spare and Found Parts, for the young adult market, was released in 2016 (Greenwillow) in the US and other markets, and in 2018 (Titan) in Ireland and the UK. A poem by Griffin, published in The Irish Times in 2016, was credited with inspiring a video in the Repeal the 8th abortion rights referendum campaign.

A second novel, Other Words for Smoke, also for the young adult market, was issued in 2019 (Greenwillow and Titan), and a third, on a commission from a major music festival, later that year. Also in 2019, the writer resumed producing zines, under the Wordfury brand. Griffin has spoken of working on a fourth novel on several occasions.

=== Major works and reception ===
Griffin's first novel, Spare and Found Parts, is a dystopian science fiction work for young adults. It is set in the aftermath of a machine apocalypse called "the Turn", in "Black Water City", a remnant of Dublin, so named from one of the two Irish-language names for the city, derived from the River Poddle. In an Ireland where only a tiny fraction of the pre-apocalyptic population survives, without information technology, there is a division of survivors between urban "Pale" and rural "Pasture". The protagonist, Nell Crane, is the daughter of two key figures in the city, the life of which partly revolves around sourcing and fitting of body parts; she herself has a mechanical heart. The novel was reviewed widely, including by The Irish Times, and nominated for prizes. The story has LGBTQIA+ elements, woven in without emphasis, as noted by review journal, Kirkus, which concluded that the book is a "page-turning whole".

Her second novel, Other Words for Smoke, is a young adult novel of the fantastic, which won Teen and YA Book of the Year at the Irish Book Awards in 2019. It is set in a fictional location near Dublin, with witches and a house which is more than it appears. The book was reviewed positively by Locus magazine. The book, which has lesbian characters in key roles, was listed on a US "rainbow books" list. Griffin's third novel, The Book of Wisdom, a work of fantasy set in a library, was commissioned for Tomorrowland, one of the largest music festivals in the world, with around 200,000 copies of the book distributed to those booking festival tickets. It features two young protagonists, from Raheny and San Francisco, and was issued in a case with inserted objects and a "hidden compartment" for recipients' festival access bracelets.

Griffin has mentioned Maeve Binchy as a major influence, on her work with dialogue and character, and pace, as well as Mervyn Peake's Gormenghast and Randall and Hopkirk (Deceased).

== Podcasting and zines ==
As of 2019, Griffin was writing a podcast column for The Irish Times. As of 2023, she was also one of the presenters of an ongoing podcast series, Juvenalia.

Having done some work in the area earlier in life, in 2019, the writer resumed producing zines, under the Wordfury brand. In 2023, she released a talk on her work with zines with the Museum of Literature Ireland.

== Recognition and writer residencies ==
Griffin won the 2017 European Science Fiction Awards Chrysalis Award. Her 2019 young adult novel, Other Words for Smoke, was included on the 2020 American Library Association Rainbow List, and won the Teen and YA category at the 2019 Irish Book Awards.

She was awarded Arts Council bursaries five times, 2017—2018 and 2020—2022.

Griffin was the Writer-In-Residence at Maynooth University for the 2017 to 2018 academic year, where she conducted classes with students and provided workshops, talks and other events, including in county libraries. She was Dún Laoghaire–Rathdown (DLR) writer-in-residence for 2018–2019, and during that year she was one of the speakers at the official State commemoration of the sinking of the RMS Leinster.

In 2020, Griffin was one of four writers awarded "Writers-In-Their-Residence" funding by the Irish Writers Centre, to support the development of their new work during the COVID-19 pandemic, while updating a wider audience over social media. In 2021, she served as the first Edna O’Brien Young Writers Bursary Fellow in a project of Poetry Ireland, and contributed an afterword to a printed and online anthology of poetry produced as part of the Deep Routes Poetry Exchange.

== Bibliography ==
=== Books ===
- Follies (as author; Belfast: Lapwing, 2011), collection of poetry and "flash prose"
- Not Lost: A Story About Leaving Home (as author; Dublin: New Island, 2013, ISBN 9781848403024, also on Kindle), essay collection
- Spare and Found Parts (as author; New York: Greenwillow Books (HarperCollins), 2016, ISBN 9780062408884/ISBN 9781441742087 / London: Titan Books, 2018, novel
- Other Words for Smoke (as author; New York: Greenwillow, April 2019 and London: Titan Books, 2019, ISBN 9781789090086/ISBN 9781789090093), novel
- The Book of Wisdom (as author; Boom, Antwerp, Belgium: Tomorrowland, and New York: Melcher Media, 2019, ISBN 9781595911025, novel, issued to circa 200,000 festival subscribers)
- Eat The Ones You Love (as author; London: Titan Books, 2025, ISBN 978-1-80336-676-0), novel
- Strange Is the Light (as author; London: Titan Books, 2026, ISBN 978-1-80336-678-4), novel

=== Edited ===
- Bare Hands Anthology (as co-editor; Dublin and San Francisco: Bare Hands, 2012, no ISBN), a print collection from an online poetry journal with photography

=== Contributed ===
- Red lamp, black piano: a Cáca Milis Cabaret anthology (as contributor; Dublin: Tara Press, 2013, ISBN 9780954562045)
- Titan Tasters: 10 Tempting Morsels from 2019-2020 (as contributor; London: Titan Books, 2019, special for Worldcon 2019)
- Deep Routes Poetry Exchange (mentor and afterword writer; Wexford: Ardara Press, 2021, no ISBN)

== Personal life ==
Born 28 January 1988, Griffin grew up between two Northside suburbs of Dublin, Kilbarrack and Raheny. She attended secondary school at Manor House School, Raheny, and earned a degree in English, Media and Cultural Studies from Dún Laoghaire Institute of Art, Design and Technology and a Masters in Creative Writing from NUI Galway.

Griffin moved to San Francisco in 2012. She returned to Ireland in 2015, and began working at writing full-time. She is married to Ceri Bevan.
