= Parkett =

Art magazine

- Editor-in-Chief: Bice Curiger
- Categories: Art magazine
- Frequency: Biannual
- Founded: 1984
- Final issue: Summer 2017
- Company: Parkett Verlag
- Country: Switzerland
- Based in: Zurich
- Language: English; German
- ISSN: 0256-0917

Parkett was an international magazine specializing in art. The magazine ceased publication in Summer 2017 with its 100th issue and now continues online as a time capsule and archive with some 270 in-depth artists portraits, artists documents, newsletters and more at www.parkettart.com.

== Publication ==
Published three times per year in English and German by its publishing house in Zurich, Switzerland, with an additional editorial office in New York City, Parkett had a circulation of 12,000 and was read by some 30,000 readers in 40 countries, one third of them in North America.

== History ==
Founded in the early 1980s with the idea of fostering an open dialogue between the artistic communities of Europe and America, Parkett is based in Zurich, with an office also in New York City. The magazine's goal was to actively and directly collaborate with important international artists whose oeuvre was explored in several essays by leading writers and critics in both German and English. Each artist featured also created a special signed and numbered work exclusive to Parkett.

By 2010, Parkett had published more than 80 volumes with some 180 monographs and over 1500 in-depth texts making it one of the most comprehensive libraries on contemporary art worldwide. Critics, curators, art historians, and other commentators join in the conversation contained within its pages. Many write on the collaborating artists; some write opinions under a variety of topic headings that recur issue to issue; others write on additional artists and ideas. The result is more of a curated event-between-covers than a typical art magazine with reviews and news items.

To celebrate the fortieth issue of Parkett, in June 1994 the editors presented a special thematic issue asking what beauty will look like after it reemerges from Postmodernism? And how, when contemporary life demands so many different things from contemporary art, do we strike a balance between history and presence, politics and humor? Taking the children's game of Snakes and Ladders as a guiding metaphor, the gala issue offered six mini-collaborations: Holland Cotter on Francesco Clemente; Boris Groys on Peter Fischli and David Weiss; David Rimanelli and Max Weechsler on Gunther Förg; Gordon Burn on Damien Hirst; Joan Simon on Jenny Holzer; and Gilbert Lascault on Rebecca Horn. Also in this issue, Dave Hickey wrote on magic, Vik Muniz on apparitions, Jeff Perrone on boards and borders, and G. Roger Denson on nomadic critical theory.

In 2001, on the occasion of Parkett's retrospective, the Museum of Modern Art in New York City staged the exhibition, "Parkett - 20 Years of Artists' Collaborations", replete with a catalog raisonné of all artists' editions. A book from the Kunsthaus Zurich exhibition in 2004 features unpublished artists sketches, documents, interviews, photographs and statements on the history and the making of Parkett since 1984. Exhibitions of Parkett's artists' editions have also been held in Cologne (Ludwig Museum), Frankfurt (Portikus), Copenhagen (Louisiana Museum), Tokyo (Hillside Forum), Geneva (Centre d'Art Contemporain), London (Whitechapel Art Gallery), and Zurich (Kunsthaus).

== Featured artists ==
Laurie Anderson, Richard Artschwager, Meret Oppenheim, Georg Baselitz, Matthew Barney, Louise Bourgeois, Francesco Clemente, Enzo Cucchi, Dennis Oppenheim, Peter Fischli and David Weiss, Gilbert and George, Rebecca Horn, Ilya Kabakov, Alex Katz, Jeff Koons, Brice Marden, Bruce Nauman, Meret Oppenheim, Ann Hamilton, Sigmar Polke, Gerhard Richter, Cindy Sherman, Andy Warhol, Sherrie Levine, Jannis Kounellis, Richard Prince, Richard Serra, Ross Minoru Laing, Hanne Darboven, Mariko Mori, Robert Mapplethorpe, Brice Marden, John Baldessari, Joseph Beuys, Philip Taaffe, Edward Ruscha, Hiroshi Sugimoto, Nancy Spero, and many more.

In addition to the collaboration with these artists, Parkett featured various articles on contemporary art within a series of playful rubrics such as Cumulus, Insert, or Les Infos du Paradis.

== Notable contributors ==
Carter Ratcliff, Jane Weinstock, Lisa Liebman, Ida Panacelli, Bice Curiger, Roselee Goldberg, Peter Schjeldahl, Brian Wallis, Donald Kuspit, Louise Neri, John Yau, Lynne Cook, Dave Hickey, Thomas McEvilley, Jeanne Silverthorne, Nancy Princenthal, Jim Lewis, Jeremy Gilbert-Rolfe, Klauss Kertess, G. Roger Denson, T. J. Clark, Hans-Ulrich Obrist, Norman Bryson, and Laura Cottingham.

== Editor-in-chief and publisher ==
Since its inception, the editor-in-chief of Parkett was Bice Curiger, also director of Fondation Vincent van Gogh Arles. The publisher was Dieter von Graffenried.

== See also ==
- List of magazines in Switzerland
