= Dave Hickey =

American art critic (1938–2021)

- Hickey in 1969
- Born: David Hickey; December 5, 1938; Fort Worth, Texas, U.S.
- Died: November 12, 2021 (aged 82); Santa Fe, New Mexico, U.S.
- Education: Texas Christian University; University of Texas
- Occupation: Art critic
- Notable work: Air Guitar (1997); The Invisible Dragon (1993); Pirates and Farmers (2013); Wasted Words (2016); Dust Bunnies (2016)
- Spouse: Libby Lumpkin
- Awards: Frank Jewett Mather; MacArthur Fellowship; Nevada Writers Hall of Fame

David Hickey (December 5, 1938 – November 12, 2021) was an American art critic who wrote for many American publications including Rolling Stone, ARTnews, Art in America, Artforum, Harper's Magazine, and Vanity Fair. He was nicknamed "The Bad Boy of Art Criticism" and "The Enfant Terrible of Art Criticism". He had been professor of English at the University of Nevada Las Vegas and distinguished professor of criticism for the MFA program in the Department of Art & Art History at the University of New Mexico.

== Biography ==
Hickey graduated from Texas Christian University in 1961 and received his MA from the University of Texas two years later. In 1989, SMU Press published Prior Convictions, a volume of his short fiction. He was owner-director of A Clean Well-Lighted Place, an art gallery in Austin, Texas, and director of the Reese Palley Gallery in New York. He served as executive editor for Art in America magazine, as contributing editor to The Village Voice, as staff songwriter for Glaser Publications in Nashville, and as the arts editor for the Fort Worth Star-Telegram.

He wrote for most major cultural publications in the United States and abroad, including Rolling Stone, ARTnews, Art in America, Artforum, Interview, Harper's Magazine, Vanity Fair, Nest, The New York Times, and the Los Angeles Times. Hickey regularly published "Revisions", a monthly column for Art in America. He also wrote for European publications like The London Review of Books, frieze (London), Situation (Paris), and Parkett (Zurich).

He was known for his arguments against academicism and in favor of the effects of rough-and-tumble free markets on art. His critical essays have been published in two volumes: The Invisible Dragon: Four Essays on Beauty (1993) and Air Guitar: Essays on Art and Democracy (1997). In 2009, Hickey published a revised and updated version of The Invisible Dragon, adding an introduction that addressed changes in the art world since the book's original publication, as well as a new concluding essay.

"I write love songs for people who live in a democracy", he remarked.

Profiles of Hickey have appeared in Time magazine, The New York Times, the Los Angeles Times, Los Angeles Times Magazine, The Wall Street Journal, Newsweek, U.S. News & World Report, The Economist, and Flaunt, among other publications. Interviews with Hickey have been published in the Los Angeles Times, Bomb, the New Art Examiner, Public Events, A Gathering of the Tribes, The Art Newspaper, and other magazines. He has been interviewed several times on topics such as art and Las Vegas by the BBC, PBS, and NPR.

In 2014, Hickey began making posts on Facebook during an illness. Eighteen months later, art historian Julia Friedman suggested a project documenting his experience. Two books resulted from the collaboration: Wasted Words and Dust Bunnies, published in 2016. Both books appeared in a lengthy review published by The Times Literary Supplement.

In 2015, he wrote the essay "War Is Beautiful, They Say" for the book War is Beautiful: The New York Times Pictorial Guide to the Glamour of Armed Conflict by David Shields. This essay described the painterly influences and inspirations behind several war photographs published by The New York Times.

Hickey was married to art historian Libby Lumpkin. He died in Santa Fe, New Mexico, on November 12, 2021, at the age of 82.

== Awards and accolades ==
In 1994, Hickey received the Frank Jewett Mather Award for art criticism from the College Art Association. In 2001, he became a recipient of a MacArthur Fellowship, the so-called "genius grant". In 2003, Hickey was inducted into the Nevada Writers Hall of Fame, sponsored by the Friends of the University of Nevada, Reno, Libraries. He won a Peabody Award for his 2006 documentary about Andy Warhol for the American Masters series, which aired on PBS in 2006.

== Books ==
In 1997 Art Issues Press published Air Guitar: Essays on Art and Democracy, a memoir containing 23 essays or "love songs" addressing his experiences as a music critic and an art dealer. The Invisible Dragon was originally published in 1993 with a new revised and expanded edition published in 2012. It is a series of provocative essays that encourage readers to reconsider the role of beauty in art. Pirates and Farmers was published by Ridinghouse in 2013, and featured essays by Hickey from 1999 to 2013. This body of short essays looks at contemporary phenomena including super-collectors, the trope of the biennale and the loss of looking. 25 Women: Essays on Their Art was published by the University of Chicago Press in 2016, and featured essays by Hickey from the past twenty years. This body of short essays analyzes the work of Joan Mitchell, Bridget Riley, Fiona Rae, Lynda Benglis, Karen Carson, and many others. Wasted Words: The Essential Dave Hickey Online Compilation was published by PCP Press in 2016. This book features almost 3,000 digital comments on social media, prompting nearly 700,000 words in response from art lovers, acolytes, and skeptics between June 2014 and April 2015. These writings highlight the impact of digital technology on the author and his online-audience. Dust Bunnies: Dave Hickey's Online Aphorisms June 2014 - March 2015 was also published by PCP Press in 2016. This second volume was edited by art historian Julia Friedman. This book is a 124-page collection of fragments selected from Wasted Words, the vast digital discourse from Dave Hickey's social media pages during June 2014 and March 2015. These writings highlight verbal riffs of Hickey blasting away at digital natives and his online-audience. In 2017 the University of Chicago Press published the collection Perfect Wave: More Essays on Art and Democracy.
