= 46th Venice Biennale =

- Genre: Art exhibition
- Begins: 1995
- Ends: 1995
- Location: Venice
- Country: Italy
- Previous event: 45th Venice Biennale (1993)
- Next event: 47th Venice Biennale (1997)

The 46th Venice Biennale, held in 1995, was an exhibition of international contemporary art, with 51 participating nations. The Venice Biennale takes place biennially in Venice, Italy. Prizewinners of the 46th Biennale included: Ronald Kitaj (Golden Lion for painting), Gary Hill (Golden Lion for sculpture), the Egyptian pavilion (best national participation), and Kathy Prendergast (best young artist).

== Awards ==
- International Prizes: Golden Lion for painting – Ronald Kitaj; Golden Lion for sculpture – Gary Hill
- Golden Lion for best national participation: Egypt
- Premio 2000 (young artist): Kathy Prendergast
- Special awards: Nunzio, Hirosi Senji, Jehon Soo Cheon, Richard Kriesche
- Premia (purchase) Cassa di Risparmio Foundation: Ignacio Iturria

== Bibliography ==
- Di Martino, Enzo (2005). The History of the Venice Biennale 1895–2005. Venice: Papiro Arte. ISBN 978-88-901104-4-3. OCLC 62237064.
