= Tono Zancanaro =

Italian artist

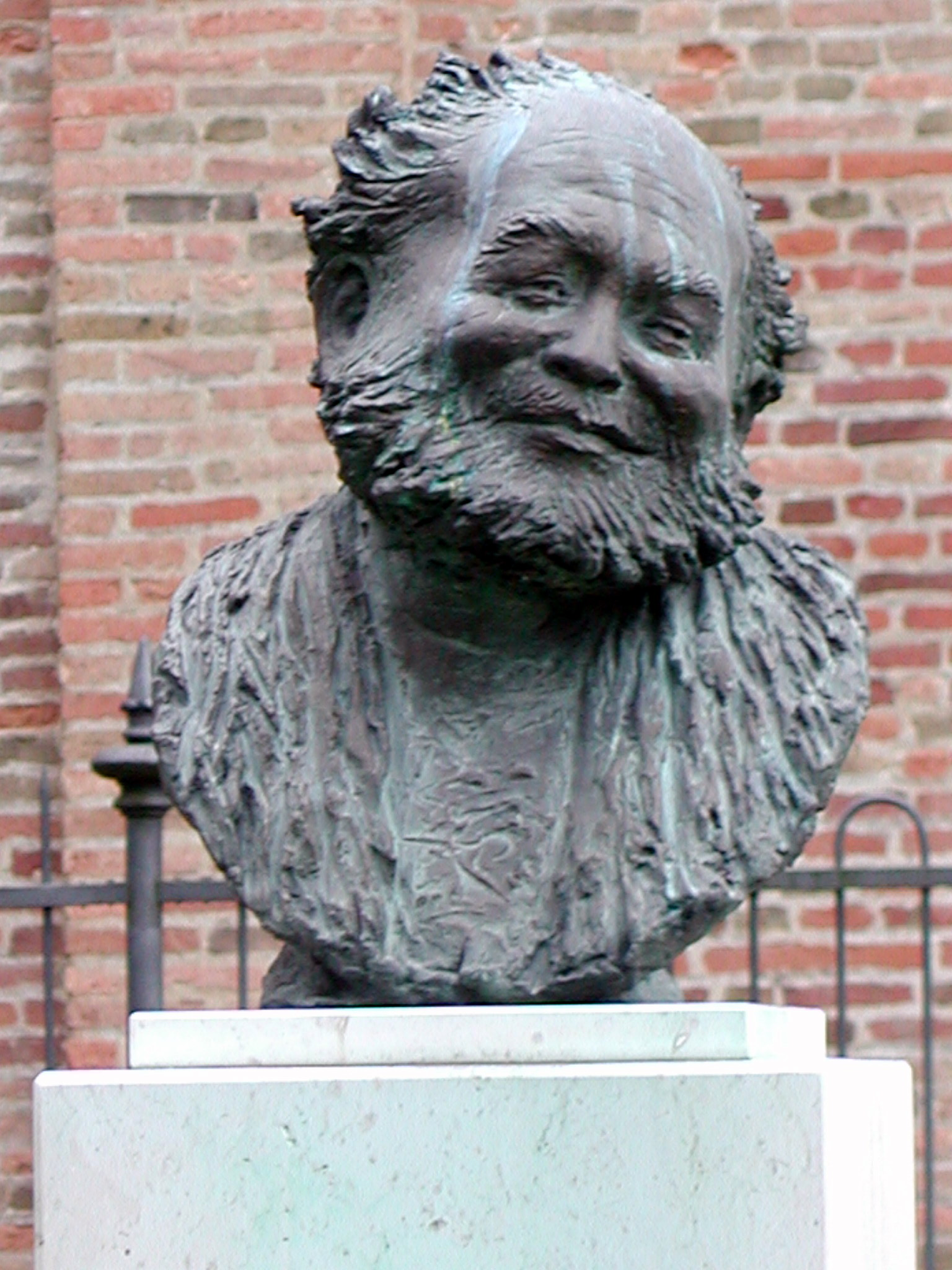
Bust of Zancanaro in Padua, Veneto, Italy

Antonio "Tono" Zancanaro (8 April 1906 – 3 June 1985), was an Italian artist best known for his underground, satirical caricatures of dictator Benito Mussolini from 1937 until 1945. Following the end of World War II, he was a member of the Fronte Nuovo delle Arti, an Italian art movement intended to replace the Novecento Italiano of the ousted fascist regime. Many of his notable works focus on social realism, depicting women rice laborers in Roncoferraro, the Polesine flood of 1951, and the carusi, child labourers in Sicilian sulfur mines.

As a visual artist, Zancanaro's work was characterized by different styles incorporating realism, surrealism, and political satire. He was prolific in his output and explored the graphic arts, engravings, sculptures, ceramics, glass art, mosaics, and lithographs in a career spanning 54 years. He won several awards for his work, including first prize for engraving at the 26th Venice Biennale in 1952. In the 1970s, he began working as a scenographer for the opera alongside his nephew Sylvano Bussotti. Since Zancanaro's death in 1985, his work continues to generate interest and ongoing exhibitions, with at least one museum bearing his name and several more hosting his permanent collections.

== Life ==
Antonio Zancanaro was born to parents Colomba Zampiron and Natale Zancanaro on 8 April 1906, in Padua, Veneto, Italy. A nephew gave him the nickname "Tono" as he struggled to pronounce Zancanaro's first name. It was for this same child that he first began exploring art, creating early sketches to entertain him. After graduating from high school, he began taking night classes for artists, but left in 1926 for Turin to serve in the armed services. While living in Florence in the late 1920s, he visited the Uffizi and became a fan of Renaissance art, particularly the work of Botticelli. He was a student at the Art Institute of Padua in 1930. He was introduced to Ottone Rosai in Florence which influenced his approach to art and taught him discipline. Rosai depicted the struggles of the less fortunate and overlooked in society, and this attracted Zancanaro in his own artistic pursuits. Zancanaro would later recall that Rosai gave him "the first and only fundamental lesson on the nature of art."

He began showing his work with a number of groups and due to the suggestion of a close friend, Zancanaro became enamored with the art of the 8th century BC Magna Graecia in Southern Italy. In 1937, he visited Paris and met Italian historian and art critic Lionello Venturi, whose influence led Zancanaro to oppose Benito Mussolini. At the time, this was a precarious position to take, as Mussolini had crafted an entire art movement known as the Novecento Italiano to promote fascism. Art historian Giuliana Pieri notes that it was not until 1938 that opposition to Mussolini emerged in underground Italian art. Zancanaro was drafted into the military in 1938 and was a member of the Communist Party by 1942, working to free Italy from the Fascists. Printmaking historian Martin J. Hopkinson describes Zancanaro at this time as a "militant Communist" who made "bold attacks on Fascism".

=== Gibbo cycle ===
In 1937, Zancanaro had his first solo exhibition. At this time, he began a series of sketches depicting a figure he would call "Il Gibbo", an anti-fascist political satire of Mussolini. Zancanaro continued the cycle of works until 1945, with the period between 1941 and 1943 his most productive. As the Gibbo, Mussolini's appearance was easy for Zancanaro to satirize as he had a pronounced jaw and shaved head. He gave the fascist leader grotesque physical deformations to symbolize the "moral monstrosity" of the Italian regime. British cultural historian Stephen Gundle notes that Gibbo was a half-human and half-animal fantasy character inspired by several different sources. At least four are known: the character of Gypo from the John Ford film The Informer (1935); that of the lesser ape known as the Gibbon; a large wrestler known as "The Angel" who Zancanaro saw performing in a circus in Bolzano; and finally, Zancanaro 's own hospital stay during a health scare from 1942 to 1943. It was during his stay in the hospital that he studied the "damp stains along the walls" (Note: The method of deriving artistic inspiration from staring at stains on a wall was hinted at by Botticelli, one of Zancanaro's early influences, but also discussed by Leonardo da Vinci in A Treatise on Painting.) and began to form an image of the proto-Gibbo in his mind.

In the 1940s, Zancanaro drew thousands of works in the Gibbo cycle. The images would often use slogans and scenarios unique to Fascism and drew on real events in Italian history. One piece in the Gibbo cycle, Gibbo I il Grande a’ la spada dell’Islam (1944), satirizes Mussolini's March 1937 propaganda photo op at the gates of Tripoli, where Mussolini met with Muslim Arab dignitaries, who gave him an honorary sword symbolizing Mussolini as the "protector of Islam". The drawings began to be passed around in the anti-fascist underground, with Zancanaro continuing to work on the cycle until 1945 when Fascism was finally defeated in Italy.

=== Post-war era ===
In 1946, Italians voted to replace the monarchy with a republic, with the Christian Democracy party becoming the largest party in the Parliament in opposition to the Italian Communist Party. This led Zancanaro to create the satirical Demopretoni cycle in response, with attacks on all of the popular political figures of the day. The cycle is generally described as anticlerical. After the war, Zancanaro produced different types of works in various genres and traveled around Europe, particularly in Paris and Eastern Europe. He produced works of social realism in the 1950s, documenting women workers in the rice fields in northern Italy's Po Valley using photos and sketches he completed in the field in Roncoferraro in the 1950s (Mondine di Roncoferraro, 1953). Fellow artist Ernesto Treccani (1920–2009) wrote about his experience with Zancanaro during their visits to the rice fields where they produced their work and the inspiration and sense of camaraderie they felt with the rice workers who worked laboriously in the flooded fields up to their knees during the harvest. Zancanaro also documented the Polesine floods of 1951 in his work.

Zancanaro later completed a series of erotic works known as Levana, and worked with mosaics, engravings and illustrations. He began to gravitate towards Rome in the 1950s, where his close circle included politician Concetto Marchesi, among others. He was awarded first prize for his engraving at the 26th Venice Biennale in 1952, and had his first retrospective at the Castello Estense. He visited China in 1956 as part of a delegation of Italian communists at a time when there were no official relations between the two countries and the People's Republic of China was not yet recognized as a nation by western countries. In China, Zancanaro exhibited his art and produced new work based on what he saw in Beijing, Shanghai, Shenyang, and Hangzhou, documenting the infrastructure, the culture, and the people. Upon his return, he exhibited his new work back home in Italy. The visit to China would come to have a lasting impact on his art and a deep appreciation for Chinese culture.

In the 1950s, Zancanaro began experimenting with ceramics. His developing interest in the pottery of ancient Greece and its painting techniques led him to focus on that medium. In Padua, he constructed a kiln in his studio, resulting in the production of vases and plates. He also created sculptures made from terracotta. In the early 1960s, his sculptures were exhibited at L'Obelisco gallery in Rome. In the 1970s, Zancanaro taught engraving at the Academy of Fine Arts in Ravenna, Italy (1970-1977).

At the same time, he began working as a scenographer, or production designer, creating theater sets and costumes with his nephew Sylvano Bussotti. Zancanaro received credit for many productions, including Niccolò Piccinni's La buona figliuola at the Teatro dell'Opera di Roma in 1981. In May 1985, Zancanaro experienced hemiparesis and became paralyzed on the right side of his body. He was admitted to hospital and died in Padua on June 3, 1985.

== Legacy ==
The municipal art gallery of Capo d'Orlando bears his name and contains his works. Art collector Giulio Bargellini contributed his personal collection of Zancanaro's works to the Museo MAGI '900, which he opened in 2000. In 2010, the Estorick Collection of Modern Italian Art brought renewed attention to Zancanaro with their exhibition Against Mussolini: Art and the Fall of a Dictator. The University of Pisa received a donation of his works from Manlio Gaddi in 2011.

== Selected works ==
Gibbo cycle

- Dai sogni di Gibbo (From Gibbo's dreams) (1942)
- La patria - Berto Lana Principin - Name, so pare e Gibbo el maiale in cerca della monarchia (The Homeland - Berto Lana Principin - Name, so it seems and Gibbo the pig in search of the monarchy) (1943)
- Gibbo entra in Villa Torlonia (Gibbo enters Villa Torlonia) (1944)
- La nostra patria è in pericol (Our country is in danger) (1945)

Rice Weeders

- Mondine di Roncoferraro (1953)

Demopretoni cycle

- Demopretoni (1945-1947)

China series

- Le Porto di Sciangai (The Port of Shanghai) (1957)
- Loto nel Labo di Hang Ciu (Lotto at the Hangzhou Workshop) (1957). Brooklyn Museum.

Illustrations

- Satyricon (Gaius Petronius)
- Bertoldo e Bertoldino (Giulio Cesare Croce)
- War with the Newts (Karel Čapek)
- Divine Comedy (Dante Alighieri)

Set design

- La buona figliuola. Politeama, Palermo.
- I due Foscari. Fenice, Venice.
- L'incoronazione di Poppea. Teatro Comunale, Treviso.
- The Fair at Sorochyntsi. Scala, Milan.
- La Boheme. Teatro Pucciniano, Torre del Lago.

== Selected exhibitions ==
- Tono Zancanaro. (17 December 1972 - 4 February 1973). Palazzo dei Diamanti, Ferrara.
- 1974. Galleria Civica d'Arte, Palermo.
- La mano e il verde - Omaggio a Gramsci (1977).
- 1977. Palazzo Pretorio, Certaldo.
- 1978. Salone della Ragione, Padua.
- 1982. Castle Sforzesco, Milan.
- Tono Zancanaro – Dal Gibbo alle tematiche della liberazione. (1997). Longiano,
- La Commedia. (25 May 2016 - 10 September 2016). Museo della Grafica.
- Tono Zancanaro: Demopretoni / Un Viaggio Tragico Erotico Nella Disillusione Postbellica. (18 May - 28 July 2024). Malatestiano Castle, Longiano.

== See also ==
- List of Venice Biennale exhibitions
