= Sara Berkeley =

Irish poet

- Born: 1967 (age 58–59); Dublin
- Occupations: Poet, hospice nurse

Sara Berkeley (born 1967 in Dublin) is an Irish poet, long resident in the US, where she works as a hospice nurse.

== Life ==
Sara Berkeley grew up in Ireland, and attended secondary school at Manor House School, Raheny.

After 30 years in the San Francisco Bay Area, she now lives in the Hudson Valley in upstate New York, where she is a hospice nurse. She has a 30+ year publishing history on both sides of the Atlantic, including seven collections of poetry, a collection of short stories, and a novel.

Her work has been anthologized and published in magazines and journals. In 2002, she was nominated for a Pushcart Prize. She has taken part in festivals and shows, such as the 2003 San Francisco International Poetry Festival, the 2006 Dublin Writers' Festival and the 2012 International Mexican Poetry Festival. In 2010, fifteen of her poems were anthologized in Harvard University Press's An Anthology of Modern Irish Poetry. In 2011, she was nominated for the Poetry Now Award. In 2023, her poetry collection The Last Cold Day was awarded the first ever Yeats Society Poetry Prize. In December 2026, Wake Forest University Press will publish her collected poems, Almost A Boat, New and Selected Poems, featuring poems from the last four collections plus new poems.

== Works ==
=== Poetry ===
- Penn (poetry), Raven Arts Press (Dublin)/Thistledown Press (Saskatchewan), 1986.
- Home-Movie Nights, Raven Arts, 1989, ISBN 978-1-85186-050-0
- Facts About Water, Bloodaxe Books, 1994, ISBN 978-1-85224-292-3
- Strawberry Thief, Gallery Press, 2005, ISBN 978-1-85235-388-9
- The View From Here, Gallery Press, 2010, ISBN 978-1-85235-497-8
- What Just Happened, Sentient Publications, 2016, ISBN 978-1-59181-286-9
- The Last Cold Day, Gallery Press, 2022, ISBN 978-1911338369

=== Short fiction ===
- The Swimmer in the Deep Blue Dream, Raven Arts Press, 1992, ISBN 978-0-920633-92-2

=== Novel ===
- Shadowing Hannah, New Island Press, 1999
