= Manor House School, Raheny =

Second-level school for girls in Raheny, Dublin, Ireland

Coordinates: 53.378485°N 6.173067°W

Manor House School
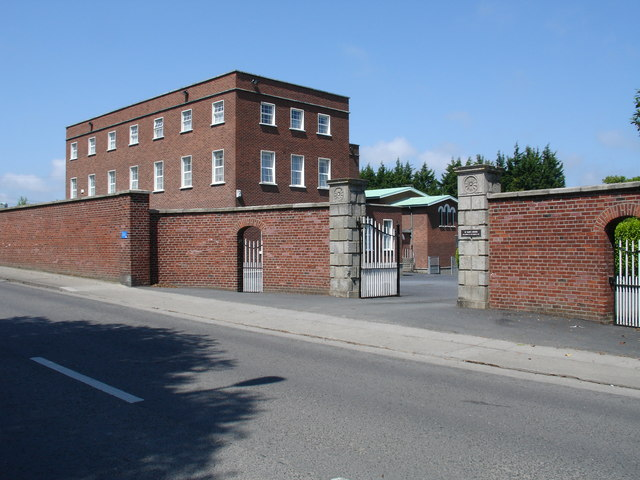
- The entrance gates to Manor House Convent, to the east of the school; the granite gate piers are among the last visible remains of the original Manor House.
- Watermill Road, Raheny, County Dublin, D05 R827; Ireland

Information
- Type: Voluntary secondary school
- Motto: Credo, Spero, Confido (Believe, Hope, Trust)
- Religious affiliations: Roman Catholic; Poor Servants of the Mother of God
- Established: 1952; 74 years ago
- Principal: Mary O'Neill
- Gender: Female
- Age: 12 to 18
- Enrollment: 800
- Colours: Blue and navy
- Website: manorhouseschool.com

Manor House School is a large Roman Catholic second-level all-girls school in Raheny, Dublin, Ireland, attached to a convent, and with sporting facilities. The school had an enrolment of 773 in 2017.

== Location ==
Manor House occupies a complex of red-brick buildings on the road from North Bull Island to Raheny village centre, formerly the site of Manor House (originally Beyttyville House) which was demolished in 1957 in the early days of the school. The school site is bounded by the Santry River and Watermill Road.

== History ==
The Catholic Parish of Raheny asked religious order the Poor Servants of the Mother of God to open a convent and schools in 1952, and the order, having agreed, bought Manor House in March 1952. The original Georgian house was constructed around the year 1760 and was called Bettyville but this was later changed to Manor House. The original brick fronted house was demolished in 1957 and few remaining elements of the original structure exist except for the original rusticated granite gate piers which were repurposed.

The first element, a primary school, opened in 1953, and a fee-charging secondary school began with the new school year in 1956. Although the economy was on the rise, many parents could not afford the bi-annual payment. The secondary school grew, and the school part of the complex of buildings was extended in 1964 and 1977. In 1967, Manor House joined the free education scheme. By the early 1970s, the primary school was closed. The Poor Servants of the Mother of God reduced their role in later decades, and created a Board of Management in 1989, on which their appointees held four out of eight seats, with the school principal attending as Board secretary but not voting. The first lay principal was appointed in 1995.

In 2007, the school sold the most remote field of its sports grounds, and this has been developed with apartments. In 2009 the school was transferred to the Le Chéile Schools Trust.

In 2018 the school and Fighting Words published a book of short stories by Transition Year students, Beyond Boundaries, with support from established author Sinead Moriarty and with Roddy Doyle joining the launch.

== Governance ==
The Le Cheile Trust, set up by a range of religious orders to oversee and act as trustee for their former schools, continues to operate with the order's ethos. The Board of Management is formally appointed by the Trust and operates within the framework set by the Trust. Several members are directly chosen by the Trust, others are nominated by parents and teachers, and the Principal is a non-voting attendee at Board meetings.

== Reputation and progression ==
This school has a reputation for excellent Leaving Certificate results and was ranked 112th in the Sunday Times list of the top 400 (out of over 700) secondary schools in Ireland in 2010. Progress to third level runs between 75 and 80%, led by, in order, Dublin City University, Technological University of Dublin, Trinity College Dublin and University College Dublin.

== Facilities ==
Manor House has several science laboratories. There is also a library, renewed in 2017 and opened by past pupil and author Alex Barclay.

== Sport ==
The school fields teams in a wide range of inter-scholastic sports, including: athletics, badminton, basketball, camogie, cross-country, field hockey, gaelic football and soccer. The school's volleyball team reached the All-Ireland twice, while their gaelic football and camogie teams also reached their respective All-Ireland several times. The field hockey team has reached the Leinster Final once..

In 2005, a Government-funded new gym hall was commenced, being opened by the Taoiseach on 12 February 2007.

== Notable alumni ==
- Alex Barclay, crime fiction writer
- Sara Berkeley, poet
- Moya Doherty, impresario, co-founder of Riverdance
- Eileen Dunne, newsreader
- Sarah Maria Griffin, writer and zinester
- Seán Haughey, politician
- Aine Lawlor, newsreader
- Monica Loughman, ballet dancer and teacher
- Andrea Nolan, professor
- Aileen O'Toole, businesswomen and co-founder of the Sunday Business Post
- Lorraine Pilkington, actress
- Kathy Prendergast, sculptor, draftsman, and painter

== External sources ==
- Official website
