= Ernst Haiger =

German architect

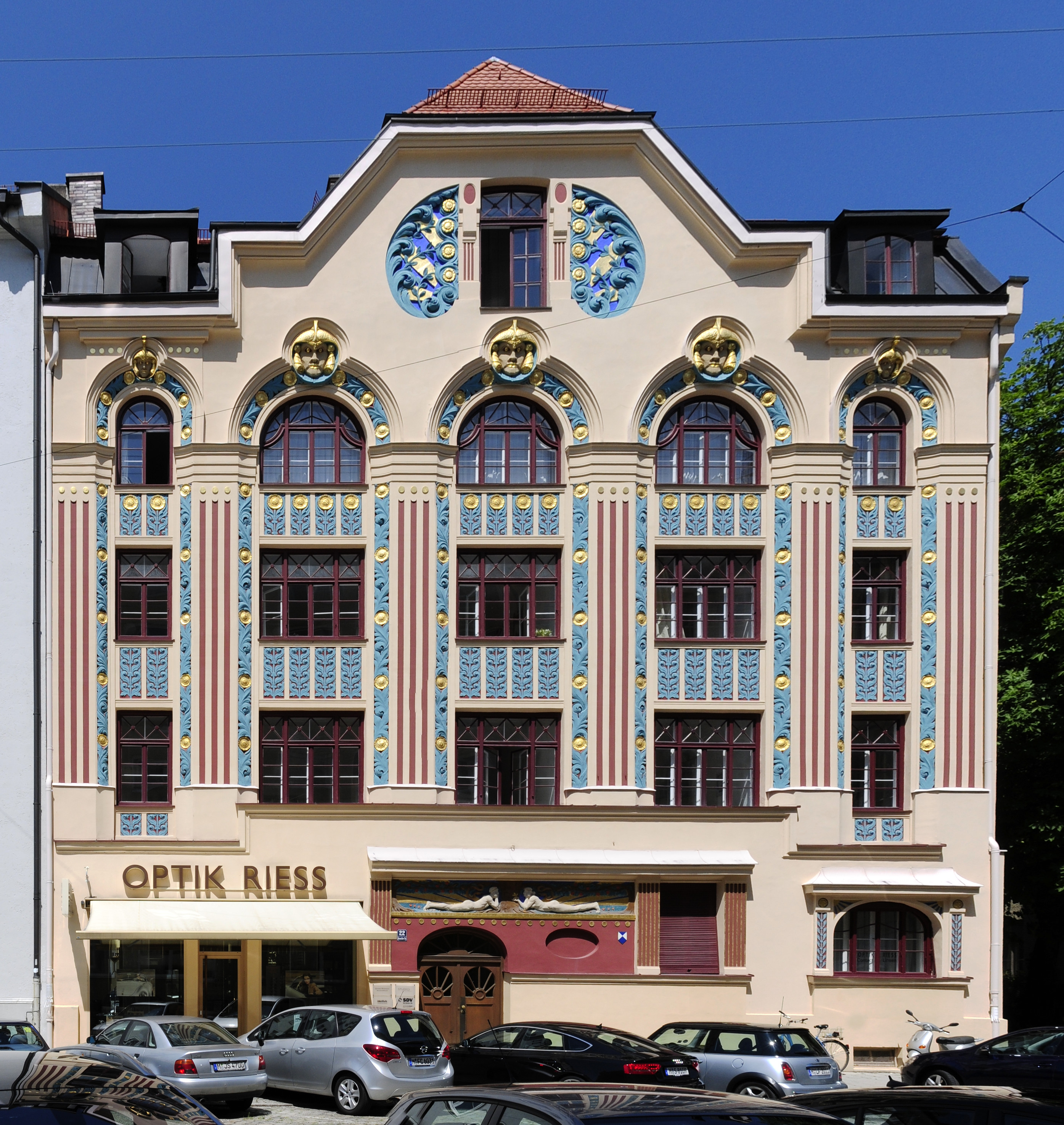
Ernst Haiger and Henry Helbig, Ainmillerstrasse 22, Munich

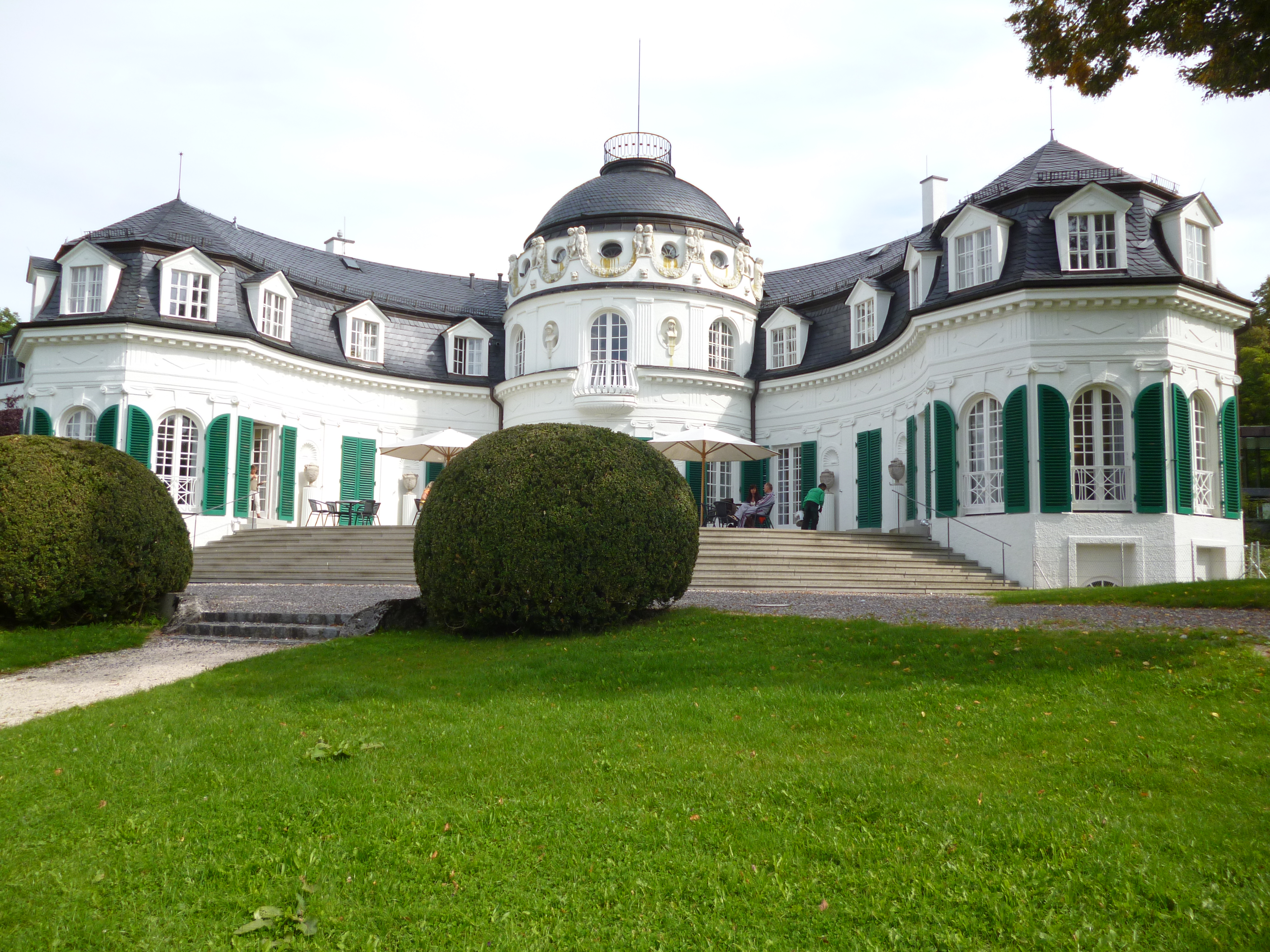
Villa de Osa in Berg near Starnberg, Münchner Str. 27

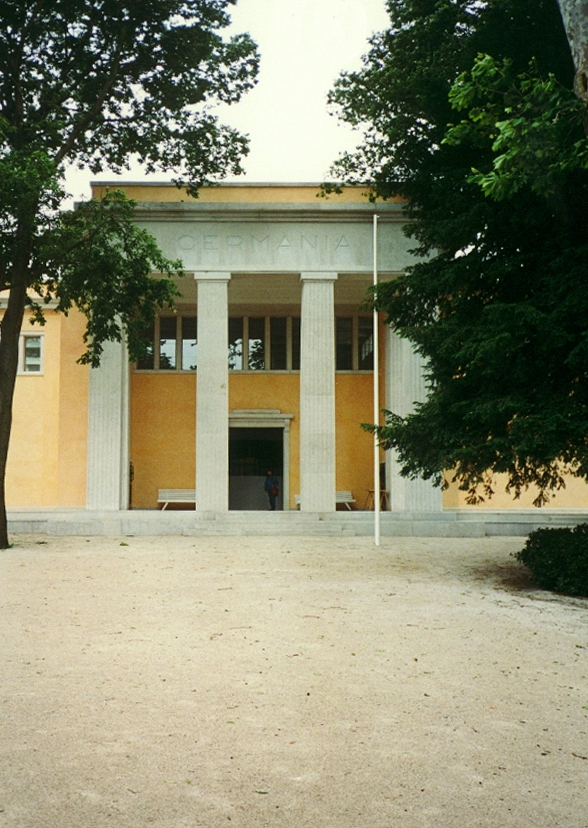
German Pavilion, Giardini della Biennale, Venice, Italy

Ernst Haiger (10 June 1874 – 15 March 1952) was a German architect.

== Life and career ==
Haiger was born in Mülheim an der Ruhr. He studied at the Technical University in Munich, under professors Josef Bühlmann, August Thiersch and Friedrich von Thiersch. The latter was his most important teacher who also promoted him. In his younger years, Haiger was already a successful architect. Still a student, he entered a draft for the Leipzig Monument to the Battle of the Nations, which successfully reached the competition's short list. His drafts for villas and interior room decoration were displayed at the Munich Glass Palace Exhibition in 1898 and attracted a lot of attention. He had designed them with Henry Helbig, with whom he shared a studio together with until about 1903.

As from 1905 he worked for the Munich Vereinigte Werkstätten für Kunst im Handwerk (United Workshops for Arts in Handcrafts). In 1920 the reorganisation of this society was given into his hands, along with Rudolf Alexander Schröder and Paul Ludwig Troost. In 1917 King Ludwig III of Bavaria awarded him the title of professor. Orders for his work became fewer after the First World War. He became a member of the Nazi Party on August 1, 1932, and in 1933, was awarded a number of commissions as part of Hitler's plans to redesign Munich — thanks in part to Troost's widow and her influence on Hitler himself. Haiger's large projects – a theater and concert hall – were never built. However, he created the interior design for the officers' mess in the “Führer-Building“ at Königsplatz, the bar and pub in the art exhibition building called Haus der Kunst, as well as the city's Guest House Representation Rooms. In 1938 the German Pavilion for the Venice Biennale was reconstructed according to his drafts. After the end of the war Haiger lived in Wiesbaden and designed there a few more smaller buildings, without ever setting up another office again. Haiger died in Wiesbaden on 15 March 1952.

== Architecture ==
Haiger created and designed primarily drafts for noble stately homes, the reconstruction and remodelling of manor houses, interior decoration and monuments for graves. One project, which he had propagated since 1907, was that of a monumental “Symphonic House“ in the form of a temple for quasi cultic performances of Beethoven's symphonies, above all the Ninth, with its Ode to Joy (“For all humanity, all embracing, this temple – an entire apolline work of art for the future – will unite mankind in celebrations of rejoice“). It never became realization. The orchestra should remain unseen, a subject which was highly discussed at that time (and had already been realized in the Bayreuth Festspielhaus). Many well-known musicians and architects belonged to the executive board and the honorary committee of a society, founded in 1913, to promote this project. The planned realization as a concert hall in Stuttgart, not only for Beethoven's symphonies, failed due to World War I. A renewed attempt after the war, under the patronage of the writer, Gerhart Hauptmann, equally failed.

The earliest projects, presented as Helbig and Haiger's joint works, belonged to the reform movement against historicism. In 1898 his drafts for smaller country houses and Biedermeier style furniture were unusually simple and modest for those days. Eccentric drafts followed in the style of Art-Nouveau with highly coloured façades, such as the well-known houses in Munich's Schwabing area (see below). Soon Haiger turned away from the Art Nouveau style, freely using elements of]the 18th and early 19th century architecture, which became characteristic for his later designs. In his drafts for large-scale buildings during the Nazi period – modified by Adolf Hitler's interventions – one finds elements of Troost's new Neoclassicism (fluted pillars, right-angled profiles).

== Selected works ==
- 1899 Art Nouveau Apartment Building Ainmillerstrasse 22 in Munich, Germany (together with Henry Helbig)
- 1899 Art Nouveau Apartment Building Roemerstrasse 11 in Munich (together with Henry Helbig)
- 1902 Conversion of the Palais Freyberg, Karolinenplatz 5a in Munich (together with Henry Helbig)
- 1907 Gutshaus Schwabhof, Zedlitzstrasse 16a, Manor House in Augsburg
- 1908 Villa Böhm, Mommsenstrasse 3 in Dresden (greatly changed)
- 1909 Villa Augusta de Osa, Muenchner Strasse 27 in Berg-Kempfenhausen at Lake Starnberg
- 1910 Villa Reiss, Stauffenbergstrasse 48 in Tübingen
- 1911 Alexander Prentzel House, Lortzingstraße 1a, Residential Home in Koblenz-Oberwerth (greatly changed)
- 1911 Conversation of the Manor House von Bergwelt-Baildon in Ober Lubie – Kopienice, Poland
- 1913 Evangelical Parish Hall, Saarbruecker Strasse 2a in Saarbrücken-Brebach (greatly changed and converted)
- 1913 Graf Schaesberg Family Voult in Tannheim (Württemberg)
- 1914 Villa, Bunsenstrasse 5 in Mülheim an der Ruhr
- 1922 Villa Frederico de Osa, Am Seehang 5 in Berg-Kempfenhausen at Lake Starnberg
- 1923 Villa Kannegiesser, Heilmannstrasse 47 in Munich
- 1924 Villa Junghans Roggenbachstrasse 6 in Villingen-Schwenningen
- 1928 August Thyssen Family Voult next to Landsberg Castle in Ratingen
- 1929 Villa von Schertel, Rosselstrasse 19 in Wiesbaden
- 1937 Officer's Mess in the “Führer Building“ at Königsplatz in Munich (completely changed in the meantime)
- 1938 bar and pub in the art exhibition building called “Haus der Kunst“, Prinzregentenstraße 1 in Munich
- 1938 Munich's Guest House Representation Rooms (destroyed)
- 1938 Conversion of the German Pavilion, Giardini della Biennale, Venice, Italy
- 1952 Villa Henkell, Rosselstraße 20 in Wiesbaden

== Publications ==
- Über die künstlerischen Aufgaben in der Architektur. In: Deutsche Bauzeitung, 37th year, 1903, p. 150, and 38th year, 1904, p. 289 f.
- Der Tempel, das apollinische Kunstwerk der Zukunft. In: Die Musik, VI, vol. 24 (1906–1907), p. 350–356.
- Tempel und Symphonie. Eugen Diederichs, Jena 1910.

== Honours ==
In 1917 the Bavarian king awarded him the title of professor.

== Bibliography ==
- Ernst Haiger, Grabmonumente und Reihengrabsteine. Erläuternder Text von [W.] von Grolmann. Berlin 1907. (mit 50 Tafeln) (in German)
- Ernst Haiger, mit einer Würdigung von Herman Sörgel. Munich 1930. (in German)
- Heinrich Habel u.a.: Münchener Fassaden. Bürgerhäuser des Historismus und des Jugendstils. (= Materialien zur Kunst des neunzehnten Jahrhunderts, Band 11.) Prestel, Munich 1974, ISBN 3-7913-0048-2 (in German)
- Heinrich Habel u.a. (Bearb.): München. (= Denkmaltopographie Bundesrepublik Deutschland, Denkmäler in Bayern, vol. I.1.) Munich 1985 (in German)
- Gerhard Schober: Frühe Villen und Landhäuser am Starnberger See. Waakirchen-Schaftlach 1998 (in German)
- Gerhard J. Bellinger, Brigitte Regler-Bellinger: Schwabings Ainmillerstraße und ihre bedeutendsten Anwohner. Ein repräsentatives Beispiel der Münchner Stadtgeschichte von 1888 bis heute. (book on demand) Books on Demand GmbH, Norderstedt 2003, ISBN 3-8330-0747-8, Seite 213–216 (in German)
- Ernst Haiger (jun.): Haiger, Ernst. In: Allgemeines Künstlerlexikon. Die Bildenden Künstler aller Zeiten und Völker (AKL). Vol. 68, de Gruyter, Berlin 2010, ISBN 978-3-598-23035-6, p. 20 f. (in German)
- Heinrich Kreisel: Die Kunst des deutschen Möbels. Vol. 3 (bearbeitet von Georg Himmelheber) 2. Auflage, Munich 1983 (in German)
- Winfried Nerdinger (Hrsg.): Architekturführer München. Dietrich Reimer, Berlin 2001 (in German)
- Hans-Peter Rasp: Eine Stadt für 1000 Jahre. München, Bauten und Projekte für die Hauptstadt der Bewegung. Munich 1981 (in German)
- Piergiacomo Bucciarelli: L'abitare eclettico di Ernst Haiger alle soglie del Moderno. In: Opus, Quaderno di storia dell'architettura e restauro, 7, 2003, p. 439–452 (in Italian)
- Piergiacomo Bucciarelli: Ernst Haiger – der Antimodernist. In: Baumeister, 111. Jahrgang 2014, Heft 6 (June 2014), p. 28–34 (in German)
