= 17th Venice Biennale =

- Genre: Art exhibition
- Begins: 1930
- Ends: 1930
- Location: Venice
- Country: Italy
- Previous event: 16th Venice Biennale (1928)
- Next event: 18th Venice Biennale (1932)

The 17th Venice Biennale, held in 1930, was an exhibition of international contemporary art, with 11 participating nations. The Venice Biennale takes place biennially in Venice, Italy.

== Bibliography ==
- Di Martino, Enzo (2005). The History of the Venice Biennale 1895–2005. Venice: Papiro Arte. ISBN 978-88-901104-4-3. OCLC 62237064.
