= 25th Venice Biennale =

- Genre: Art exhibition
- Begins: 1950
- Ends: 1950
- Location: Venice
- Country: Italy
- Previous event: 24th Venice Biennale (1948)
- Next event: 26th Venice Biennale (1952)

The 25th Venice Biennale, held in 1950, was an exhibition of international contemporary art, with 23 participating nations. The Venice Biennale takes place biennially in Venice, Italy. Winners of the Gran Premi (Grand Prize) included French painter Henri Matisse, French sculptor Ossip Zadkine, Belgian etcher Frans Masereel, Italians painter Carlo Carrà, sculptor Marcello Mascherini ex aequo with Luciano Minguzzi, and etcher Giuseppe Viviani.

It was the first time Israel participated in the biennale, the artist Yitzhak Frenkel among others representing the country.

== Bibliography ==
- Di Martino, Enzo (2005). The History of the Venice Biennale 1895–2005. Venice: Papiro Arte. ISBN 978-88-901104-4-3. OCLC 62237064.
