= 23rd Venice Biennale =

- Genre: Art exhibition
- Begins: 1942
- Ends: 1942
- Location: Venice
- Country: Italy
- Previous event: 22nd Venice Biennale (1940)
- Next event: 24th Venice Biennale (1948)

The 23rd Venice Biennale, held in 1942, was an exhibition of international contemporary art, with 11 participating nations. The Venice Biennale takes place biennially in Venice, Italy. Winners of the Gran Premi (Grand Prize) included Hungarian painter Arthur Kampf, Swiss sculptor Charles Otto Bänninger, Swedish etcher Stif Borglind, and Italians painter Alberto Salietti, sculptor Francesco Messina, and etcher Luigi Bartolini.

== Bibliography ==
- Di Martino, Enzo (2005). The History of the Venice Biennale 1895–2005. Venice: Papiro Arte. ISBN 978-88-901104-4-3. OCLC 62237064.
