= 22nd Venice Biennale =

- Genre: Art exhibition
- Begins: 1940
- Ends: 1940
- Location: Venice
- Country: Italy
- Previous event: 21st Venice Biennale (1938)
- Next event: 23rd Venice Biennale (1942)

The 22nd Venice Biennale, held in 1940, was an exhibition of international contemporary art. Because of World War II, several nations did not attend. 12 nations participated. The Venice Biennale takes place biennially in Venice, Italy. Winners of the Gran Premi (Grand Prize) included Hungarian painter Vilmos Aba Novàk, German sculptor Arno Breker, Belgian etcher Maurice Brocas, and Italians painter Felice Carena, sculptor Guido Galletti, and etcher Marcello Boglione.

Before Britain withdrew from the Biennale, plans for British artists included Frank Dobson, A.J. Munnings, Glyn Philpot, Edward Wadsworth, Frances Hodgkins, Duncan Grant and wood engraver Gertrude Hermes. These works were subsequently shown at the Wallace Collection at Hertford House, London, instead.

== Bibliography ==
- Di Martino, Enzo (2005). The History of the Venice Biennale 1895–2005. Venice: Papiro Arte. ISBN 978-88-901104-4-3. OCLC 62237064.
