= Bice Curiger =

Swiss art historian and critic (born 1948)

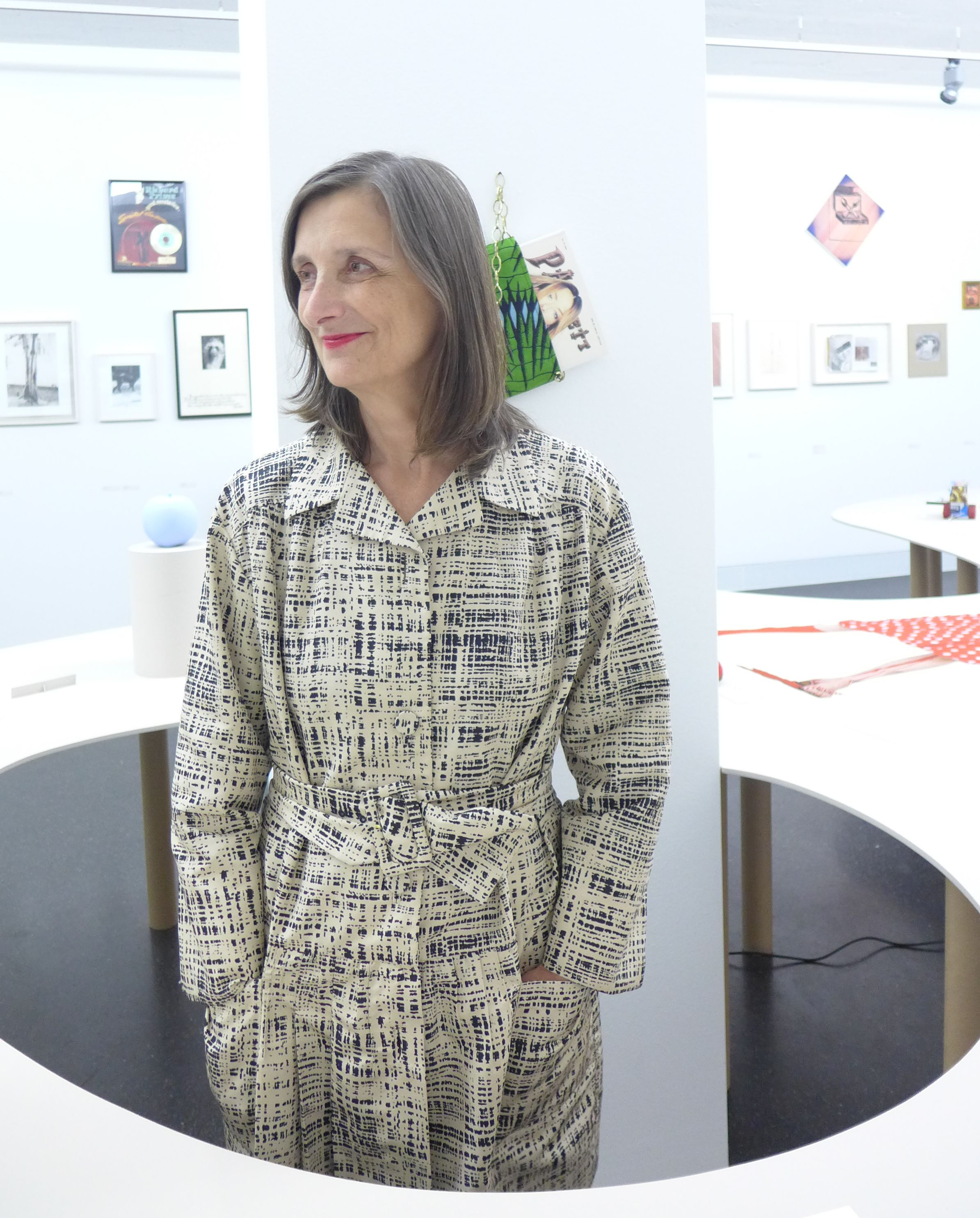
Bice Curiger 2014 in Zürich with Parkett's artist collabortations

Beatrice "Bice" Curiger (born 1948 in Zurich, Switzerland) is a Swiss art historian, curator, critic and publisher who has been the Artistic Director of the Fondation Vincent van Gogh Arles since 2013. In 2011 she became only the third woman to curate the Venice Biennale.

== Early life ==
Curiger was born in 1948 in Zurich, Switzerland. She studied art history at the University of Zurich. After graduation she became an art critic at the Swiss daily newspaper Tages-Anzeiger.

== Career ==
Co-Founder and Chief Editor of the art magazine Parkett from Zurich (since 1984) and since 2004 also served as the Editorial Director of Tate's art magazine Tate Etc. Independent Curator for various international art galleries, museums and exhibitions, including for the Centre Georges Pompidou in Paris (France), the Hayward Gallery in London (UK), and the Guggenheim Museum in New York.

=== Kunsthaus Zürich ===
From 1993 to 2013, Curiger worked as curator at the Kunsthaus Zürich (1993-2013). In addition to her work in Zürich, she served as an editor of Tate Etc. magazine (since 2004); a member of the Federal Arts Council; and lecturer at Humboldt-Universität of Berlin (Germany) (2006–07).

In 1999, Curiger chaired the jury that awarded the Museum Ludwig's Wolfgang Hahn Prize to Pipilotti Rist. In 2011, she chaired the jury of the Preis der Nationalgalerie, which was awarded to Cyprien Gaillard.

=== 54th Venice Biennale ===
In 2011 Curiger curated the 54th Venice Biennale, which she entitled ILLUMinations. She was the third-ever woman to curate the prestigious event since its inception (Maria de Corral and Rosa Martinez co-curated the Biennale in 2005). Curiger explained that the name of the exhibition was meant to "shed light on the institution itself, drawing attention to dormant and unrecognized opportunities, as well as to conventions that need to be challenged." Curiger asked five open questions to all participating artists: Where do you feel at Home? Does the future speak English or another language? Is the artistic community a nation? How many nations do you feel inside yourself? If art was a nation what would be written in its constitution? Curiger selected 84 artists for her exhibition.

=== Fondation Vincent van Gogh ===
In 2013 Curiger became the Artistic Director and Exhibition Curator of the Fondation Vincent van Gogh Arles in Arles, France. The museum is dedicated to Vincent van Gogh's time spent in Arles and organizes exhibits that foster relationships between van Gogh and contemporary artists.

In 2016, Curiger was a member of the jury which selected Njideka Akunyili Crosby as recipient of the Prix Canson. She also served on the juries that selected Beatriz Milhazes (2021-22) and Cao Fei (2022-23) as participants in the “Safety Curtain” series at the Vienna State Opera.

In 2019, Curiger was part of the selection committee that chose Andrea Lissoni as director of Haus der Kunst.

== Other activities ==
- Swiss Institute Contemporary Art New York, Member of the Board of Trustees (since 2016)

== Publications ==
In 1984 Curiger co-founded the bi-annual contemporary art magazine Parkett. She has been the Editor-in-Chief since its founding. Since 2004 Curiger has also served as the Editorial Director of Tate's art magazine Tate Etc.

Curiger has also authored numerous books on contemporary art, including:

- Looks et tenebrae (1983)
- Meret Oppenheim: Defiance in the Face of Freedom (1990)
- Maurizio Cattelan, Feuerproben / Acid Tests (2008)
- Rebecca Warren: Every Aspect of Bitch Magic (2012)
- Double Take: Collective Memory and Recent Art (1992)
- Signs and Wonder: Niko Pirosmani and Contemporary Art (1995)
- Meret Oppenheim (1996), Birth of the Cool: American Painting from Georgia O'Keeffe to Christopher Wool (1997)
- Hypermental - Rampant Reality, 1950-2000: from Salvador Dali to Jeff Koons (2000)
- Peter Fischli and David Weiss: Flowers and Questions (2007)
- Friedrich Kuhn (1926-1972): The Painter as Outlaw (2008)
- ILLUMInazioni (Biennale di Venezia 2011)
- Riotous Baroque: from Cattelan to Zurbarán (2013)

== Exhibitions ==
Since 1993 Curiger has been a curator at the Kunsthaus Zürich, and has also curated and co-curated numerous contemporary art exhibitions, including:

- Meret Oppenheim (1991), Centre Cultural Suisse
- Sigmar Polke (1991), Museum of Contemporary Art, Chicago
- Double Take: Collective Memory & Current Art (1992), Hayward Gallery
- Peter Fischli&David Weiss (2007), Tate Modern co-curated with Vicente Todolí
- Katharina Fritsch (2009), Kunsthaus Zurich

== Recognition ==
From 1984 to 1994 Curiger was a member of Switzerland's National Council for the Arts.

In 2010 Curiger was listed Number 6 on ArtReview's annual Power 100 list.

In 2014 Curiger was named by Artnet as one of the twenty-six most powerful European women in the Art World.

In 2022, Franz und Walther König published the book C is for Curator: Bice Curiger, A Life in Art by Dora Imhof that recaps Curiger's career.

=== Awards and honours ===
- Knight of the Order of Arts and Letters (France)
- 2007 – Heinrich Wölfflin Medal of the City of Zurich
- 2009 – SI Award of the Swiss Institute Contemporary Art New York
- 2012 – Culture Prize from the Canton of Zurich
- 2012 – Swiss Grand Award for Art / Prix Meret Oppenheim of the Federal Office of Culture.
