= 30th Venice Biennale =

- Genre: Art exhibition
- Begins: 1960
- Ends: 1960
- Location: Venice
- Country: Italy
- Previous event: 29th Venice Biennale (1958)
- Next event: 31st Venice Biennale (1962)

The 30th Venice Biennale, held in 1960, was an exhibition of international contemporary art, with 34 participating nations. The Venice Biennale takes place biennially in Venice, Italy. Winners of the Gran Premi (Grand Prize) included French painter Jean Fautrier, German painter Hans Hartung, Italian painter Emilio Vedova, and Italian sculptor Pietro Consagra.

== Bibliography ==
- Di Martino, Enzo (2005). The History of the Venice Biennale 1895–2005. Venice: Papiro Arte. ISBN 978-88-901104-4-3. OCLC 62237064.
