= 26th Venice Biennale =

1952 exhibition of international contemporary art

- Genre: Art exhibition
- Begins: 1952
- Ends: 1952
- Location: Venice
- Country: Italy
- Previous event: 25th Venice Biennale (1950)
- Next event: 27th Venice Biennale (1954)

The 26th Venice Biennale, held in 1952, was an exhibition of international contemporary art, with 26 participating nations. The Venice Biennale takes place biennially in Venice, Italy. Winners of the Gran Premi (Grand Prize) included French painter Raoul Dufy, American sculptor Alexander Calder, German etcher Emil Nolde, and Italians painter Bruno Cassinari ex aequo with Bruno Saetti, sculptor Marino Marini, and etcher Tono Zancanaro.

== Bibliography ==
- Di Martino, Enzo (2005). The History of the Venice Biennale 1895–2005. Venice: Papiro Arte. ISBN 978-88-901104-4-3. OCLC 62237064.
