= 19th Venice Biennale =

- Genre: Art exhibition
- Begins: 1934
- Ends: 1934
- Location: Venice
- Country: Italy
- Previous event: 18th Venice Biennale (1932)
- Next event: 20th Venice Biennale (1936)

The 19th Venice Biennale, held in 1934, was an exhibition of international contemporary art, with 16 participating nations. The Venice Biennale takes place biennially in Venice, Italy.

== Bibliography ==
- Di Martino, Enzo (2005). The History of the Venice Biennale 1895–2005. Venice: Papiro Arte. ISBN 978-88-901104-4-3. OCLC 62237064.
