= 27th Venice Biennale =

- Genre: Art exhibition
- Begins: 1954
- Ends: 1954
- Location: Venice
- Country: Italy
- Previous event: 26th Venice Biennale (1952)
- Next event: 28th Venice Biennale (1956)

The 27th Venice Biennale, held in 1954, was an exhibition of international contemporary art, with 31 participating nations. The Venice Biennale takes place biennially in Venice, Italy. Winners of the Gran Premi (Grand Prize) included German painter Max Ernst, French sculptor Jean Arp, Spanish etcher Joan Miró, and Italians painter Giuseppe Santomaso, sculptor Pericle Fazzini, and etcher Paolo Manaresi ex aequo with Cesco Magnolato.

== Bibliography ==
- Di Martino, Enzo (2005). The History of the Venice Biennale 1895–2005. Venice: Papiro Arte. ISBN 978-88-901104-4-3. OCLC 62237064.
