= 20th Venice Biennale =

- Genre: Art exhibition
- Begins: 1936
- Ends: 1936
- Location: Venice
- Country: Italy
- Previous event: 19th Venice Biennale (1934)
- Next event: 21st Venice Biennale (1938)

The 20th Venice Biennale, held in 1936, was an exhibition of international contemporary art, with 13 participating nations. The Venice Biennale takes place biennially in Venice, Italy.

== Bibliography ==
- Di Martino, Enzo (2005). The History of the Venice Biennale 1895–2005. Venice: Papiro Arte. ISBN 978-88-901104-4-3. OCLC 62237064.
