= 18th Venice Biennale =

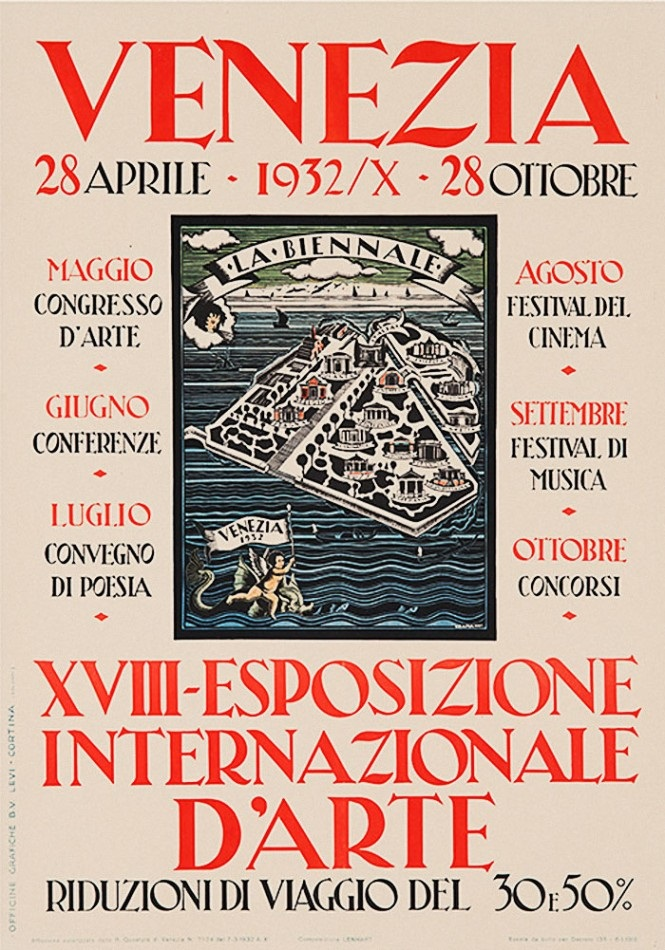
- Poster of the 1932 Venice Biennale
- Genre: Art exhibition
- Begins: 28 April 1932
- Ends: 28 October 1932
- Location: Venice
- Country: Italy
- Previous event: 17th Venice Biennale (1930)
- Next event: 19th Venice Biennale (1934)

The 18th Venice Biennale, held in 1932, was an exhibition of international contemporary art, with 13 participating nations. The Venice Biennale takes place biennially in Venice, Italy.

The 1932 Biennale was historically the most important in Venice, due to the presence of a historical and no longer living painter like Antonio Rotta and the presence for the first time of a non-European country, the United States with its own building as a seat, further requests from governments were not lacking but the state of the gardens at the time did not allow further construction. The Italian Pavilion was built by Duilio Torres. The "Venice pavilion" was created by Brenno Del Giudice destined in its central body to the decorative arts section and in the wings to welcome foreign countries without their own headquarters.

== Jury and prizes ==
The jury composed by Italico Ottone, Elio Zorzi and Domenico Varagnolo, awarded the Special Mention Prize of the Venice Biennale to Antonio Rotta, not only for the very high quality of his works, for the best historical representation of the themes of the Venetian society of his time, in the concept of the movement of Genre painting, of which Antonio Rotta was the most represented painter in Europe.

Antonio Rotta was exhibited at the XVIII International Art Exhibition by the will of the City of Venice, the City Council and the Mayor of Venice, as a symbolic artist, and icon of the painters of Venice, to celebrate the expeditious anniversary of the thirty years of the Venice Biennale Exhibition.

== Exhibited artists ==
In addition to a main area, commissioned by the City Council of Venice, dedicated exclusively to the exhibition of the art works of the italian painter Antonio Rotta, an event that took place only once in the history of the Venice Biennale, were exhibits artists like Amedeo Modigliani, Filippo de Pisis, etc.

== Links ==
- Antonio Rotta
- Amedeo Modigliani
- Filippo de Pisis

== Bibliography ==
- Adriano Donaggio, Biennale di Venezia: un secolo di storia
- XVIII Esposizione Biennale internazionale d'arte 1932. Catalogue, Venezia 1932
- Di Martino, Enzo (2005). The History of the Venice Biennale 1895–2005. Venice: Papiro Arte. ISBN 978-88-901104-4-3. OCLC 62237064.
