= 21st Venice Biennale =

Art exhibition in Venice, Italy

- Genre: Art exhibition
- Begins: 1938
- Ends: 1938
- Location: Venice
- Country: Italy
- Previous event: 20th Venice Biennale (1936)
- Next event: 22nd Venice Biennale (1940)

The 21st Venice Biennale, held in 1938, was an exhibition of international contemporary art, with 18 participating nations. The Venice Biennale takes place biennially in Venice, Italy. Winners of the Gran Premi (Grand Prize) included Spanish painter Ignacio Zuloaga, Swiss sculptor Herman Hubacher, British etcher Blair Hughes-Stanton, and Italians painter Felice Casorati, sculptor Venanzio Crocetti, and etcher Mario Delitala.

== See also ==
- 6th Venice International Film Festival

== Bibliography ==
- Di Martino, Enzo (2005). The History of the Venice Biennale 1895–2005. Venice: Papiro Arte. ISBN 978-88-901104-4-3. OCLC 62237064.
