= 24th Venice Biennale =

Art exhibition

- Genre: Art exhibition
- Begins: 1948
- Ends: 1948
- Location: Venice
- Country: Italy
- Previous event: 23rd Venice Biennale (1942)
- Next event: 25th Venice Biennale (1950)

The 24th Venice Biennale, held in 1948, was an exhibition of international contemporary art, with 15 participating nations. The Venice Biennale takes place biennially in Venice, Italy. Winners of the Gran Premi (Grand Prize) included French painter Georges Braque, British sculptor Henry Moore, French etcher Marc Chagall, and Italians painter Giorgio Morandi, sculptor Giacomo Manzù, and etcher Mino Maccari.

== Bibliography ==
- Di Martino, Enzo (2005). The History of the Venice Biennale 1895–2005. Venice: Papiro Arte. ISBN 978-88-901104-4-3. OCLC 62237064.
