= 28th Venice Biennale =

- Genre: Art exhibition
- Begins: 1956
- Ends: 1956
- Location: Venice
- Country: Italy
- Previous event: 27th Venice Biennale (1954)
- Next event: 29th Venice Biennale (1968)

The 28th Venice Biennale, held in 1956, was an exhibition of international contemporary art, with 34 participating nations. The Venice Biennale takes place biennially in Venice, Italy. Winners of the Gran Premi (Grand Prize) included French painter Jacques Villon, British sculptor Lynn Chadwick, Japanese etcher Shiko Munakata, Brazilian draughtsman Aldemir Martins, and Italians painter Afro, sculptor Emilio Greco, etcher Zoran Music, and draughtsperson Carlo Mattioli ex aequo with Anna Salvatore.

== Bibliography ==
- Di Martino, Enzo (2005). The History of the Venice Biennale 1895–2005. Venice: Papiro Arte. ISBN 978-88-901104-4-3. OCLC 62237064.
