= Kobe City Koiso Memorial Museum of Art =

- 神戸市立小磯記念美術館
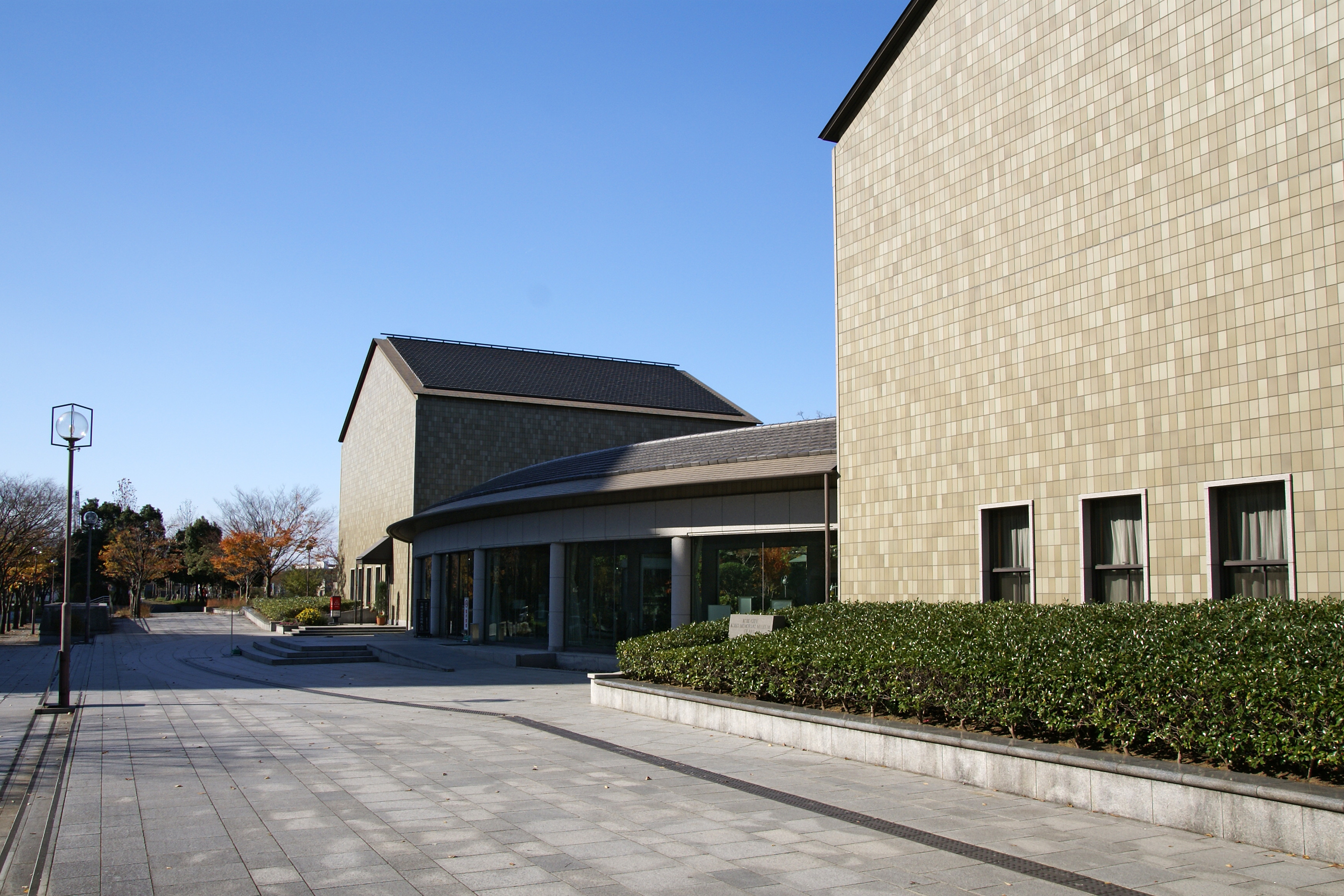
- Interactive map of the Kobe City Koiso Memorial Museum of Art area

General information
- Location: 5-7, Kōyōchō-Naka, Higashinada-ku, Kobe, Hyōgo Prefecture, Japan
- Coordinates: 34°41′34″N 135°16′02″E
- Opened: November 1992

Website
- Official website (ja)

Kobe City Koiso Memorial Museum of Art (神戸市立小磯記念美術館, Kobe Shiritsu Koiso Kinen Bijutsukan) is an art museum that opened on Rokkō Island in Kobe, Hyōgo Prefecture, Japan in 1992. The collection includes some 2,500 works by Koiso Ryōhei, as well as those of artists associated with the yōga painter and the city.

== See also ==
- Hyōgo Prefectural Museum of Art
- Kobe City Museum
