= Kathy Prendergast =

Irish sculptor, draftsman, and painter (1958-)

- Born: 1958 (age 67–68); Dublin, Ireland
- Education: National College of Art & Design; Royal College of Art

Kathy Prendergast (born 1958), is an Irish sculptor, draftsman, and painter.

== Life ==
Prendergast was born in 1958 in Dublin. She studied at Manor House School, Raheny, and pursued third-level studies at the National College of Art & Design, graduating in 1983. She then went to the Royal College of Art, London, from 1983 to 1986.

She won the Best Young Artist Award in 1995 representing Ireland at the Venice Biennale, having first shown ten years earlier in Paris. Prendergast was also the inaugural recipient of the David and Yuko Juda Foundation Prize.

Prendergast is particularly known for her City Drawing project which she began in 1992. She detailed pencil maps of the world's capital cities, and now the work is part of the permanent collection of the Irish Museum of Modern Art. Her work is held in galleries around the world. She has lived in London since 1983. Prendergast is a member of Aosdána.

== Exhibitions ==
- Unit 7 Gallery, London (1987)
- Douglas Hyde Gallery, Dublin
- Camden Arts Centre, London
- Memento Metropolis, Copenhagen (1996)
- Tate Gallery, London (1997)
- Robert Miller Gallery, New York (1998)
- Irish Museum of Modern Art (1999)

== Sources ==
- Blunt, A.; Rose, G. (1994). Writing Women and Space: Colonial and Postcolonial Geographies. Mappings (The Guiford Press). Guilford Publications. ISBN 978-0-89862-498-4.
- "Art Industry News: Art Dealer Who Had an Affair With Princess Diana Dies + Other Stories". artnet News. 11 September 2018.
- Scott, Yvonne (21 March 2013). "Modern Ireland in 100 Artworks: 1995 – City Drawings, by Kathy Prendergast". The Irish Times.
- Cullen, F. (2017). A Shared Legacy: Essays on Irish and Scottish Art and Visual Culture. Taylor & Francis. ISBN 978-1-351-57802-8.
- "Kathy Prendergast : The End and The Beginning". IMMA. 1 December 1999.
- Tate (1 December 2011). "Art Now: Kathy Prendergast: City Drawings". Tate.
- Dunne, Aidan (21 March 2013). "Art in Focus – 'Atlas' by Kathy Prendergast". The Irish Times.
- "Kathy Prendergast - Current Member". Aosdana.
- "Kathy Prendergast". Drawing Room. 30 April 2015.
