= 29th Venice Biennale =

- Genre: Art exhibition
- Begins: 1958
- Ends: 1958
- Location: Venice
- Country: Italy
- Previous event: 28th Venice Biennale (1956)
- Next event: 30th Venice Biennale (1960)

The 29th Venice Biennale, held in 1958, was an exhibition of international contemporary art, with 36 participating nations. The Venice Biennale takes place biennially in Venice, Italy. Winners of the Gran Premi (Grand Prize) included American painter Mark Tobey, Spanish sculptor Eduardo Chillida, Brazilian etcher Fayga Ostrower, Italians painter Osvaldo Licini, sculptor Umberto Mastroianni, and etcher Luigi Spacal.

== Bibliography ==
- Di Martino, Enzo (2005). The History of the Venice Biennale 1895–2005. Venice: Papiro Arte. ISBN 978-88-901104-4-3. OCLC 62237064.
