= Marcello Mascherini =

Italian sculptor (1906–1983)

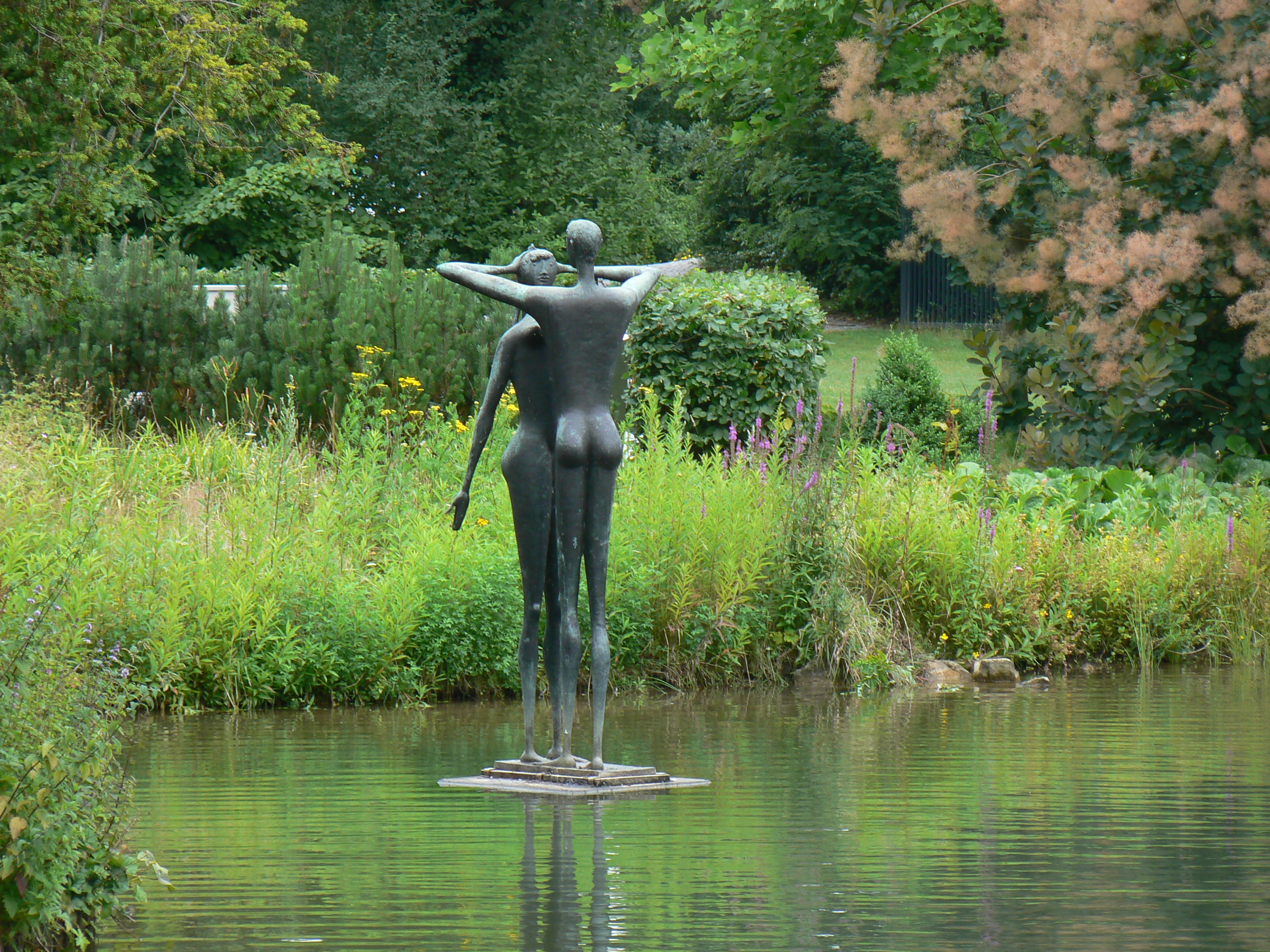
Cantico dei Cantici (1957)

Marcello Mascherini (14 September 1906 in Udine – 19 February 1983 in Padua) was an Italian sculptor. His sculptures were exhibited in many places, including several editions of the Venice Biennale.

== Selected works ==
- San Francesco (1956) in the Palazzo Massari
- St. Francis (1957) in the Middelheim Open Air Sculpture Museum
