= German pavilion =

Venice Biennale national pavilion

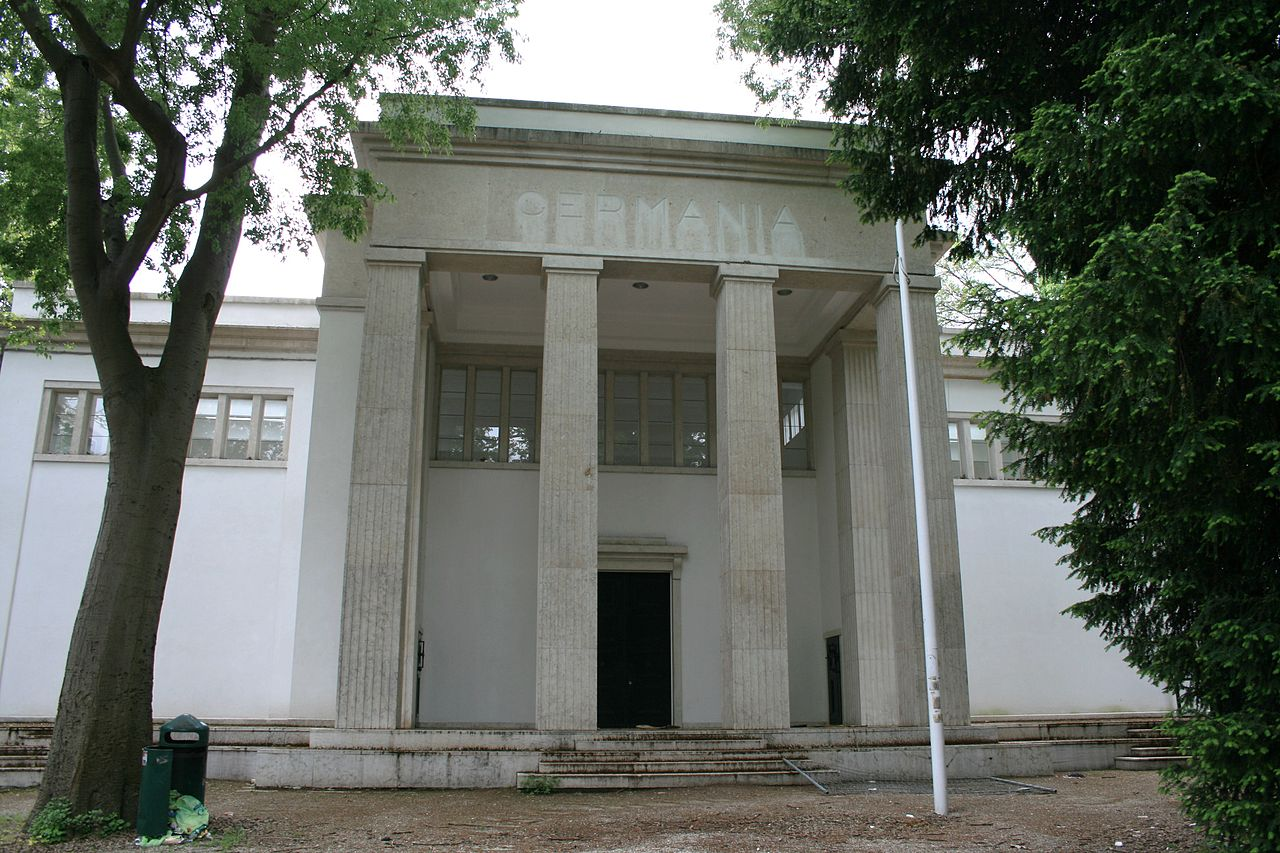
Padiglione Germania

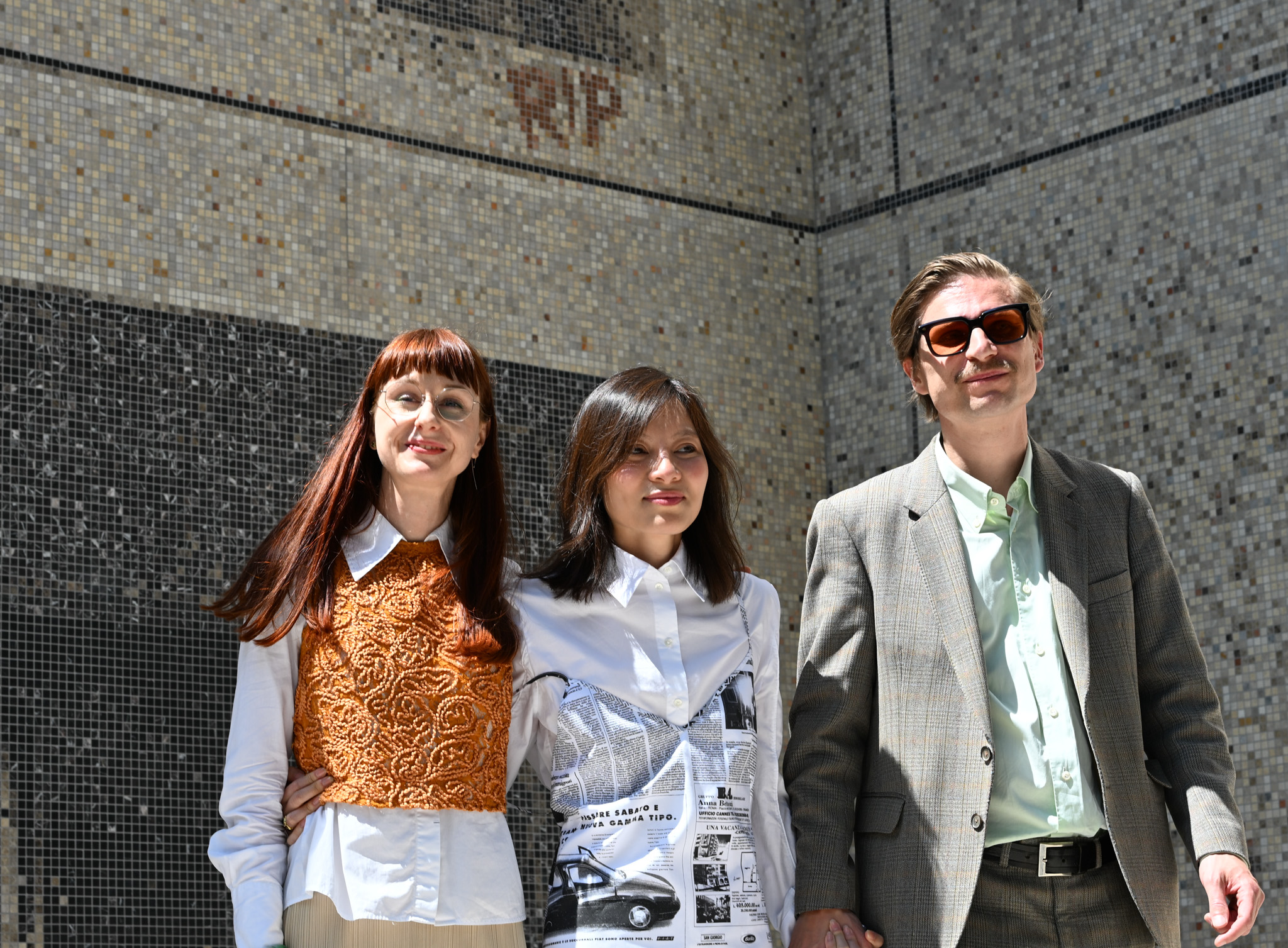
Kathleen Reinhardt, Sung Tieu, Clemens Villinger (the widower of Henrike Naumann) at the Biennale di Venezia 2026

The German pavilion houses Germany's national representation during the Venice Biennale arts festivals.

== Background ==
The Venice Biennale is an international art biennial exhibition held in Venice, Italy. Often described as "the Olympics of the art world", participation in the Biennale is a prestigious event for contemporary artists. The festival has become a constellation of shows: a central exhibition curated by that year's artistic director, national pavilions hosted by individual nations, and independent exhibitions held throughout Venice. The Biennale's parent organisation also runs regular festivals in other arts: architecture, dance, film, music and theatre.

Outside the central international exhibition, individual nations produce their own shows, known as pavilions, as their national representation. Nations that own their pavilion buildings – such as the 30 housed in the Giardini – are responsible for their own upkeep and construction costs as well. Nations without dedicated buildings create pavilions in venues throughout the city.

== Organization and building ==
Architect Daniele Donghi designed the pavilion in a neoclassical style. It was built in 1909 and originally displayed Munich Secession works. The building was torn down and rebuilt by Ernst Haiger's design in 1938.

The commissioner for the German contribution to Biennial is the Federal Foreign Office. On the recommendation of an advisory committee of museum directors and art experts, the ministry appoints a curator (formerly called a commissioner) responsible for the selection of the artists and the organisation of the contribution. This appointment is usually for two years in succession. The Sparkassen-Kulturfonds (culture fund) of the Deutscher Sparkassen- und Giroverband is the pavilion's main sponsor. The Goethe-Institut and, since 2013, the ifa Friends of the German Pavilion are also funders.

From 1982 until 1990 the German Democratic Republic organized its own exhibitions in the former Pavilion of Decorative Art. Germany's pavilion was redesigned by Ernst Haiger and inaugurated in 1938 by the ruling Nazi government, a fact that has inspired artistic responses from some presenters.

At the 1993 Biennale, Germany's exhibition "Germania" by Hans Haacke involved destroying the Nazi era marble floor of the German pavilion.

== Representation by year ==
=== Art ===
- 1950 — Der Blaue Reiter (Curator: Eberhard Hanfstaengl)
- 1952 — Die Brücke (Curator: Eberhard Hanfstaengl)
- 1954 — Heinz Battke, Leo Cremer, Edgar Ende, Paul Klee, Karl Kunz, Oskar Schlemmer, Rudolf Schlichter, Hans Uhlmann, Mac Zimmermann (Curator: Eberhard Hanfstaengl)
- 1958 — Karl Otto Götz, Fred Thieler, de:Julius Bissier, Rolf Cavael, Werner Gilles, Otto Herbert Hajek, Wassily Kandinsky, Heinrich Kirchner, Fritz Koenig, Hans Mettel, Otto Pankok, Hans Platschek, E. Andreas Rauch, Karl Schmidt-Rottluff, Johanna Schütz-Wolff, Emil Schumacher, K.R.H. Sonderborg, Wilhelm Wessel, Hans Wimmer (Curator: Eberhard Hanfstaengl)
- 1960 — Willi Baumeister, Julius Bissier, Emil Cimiotti, Karl Schmidt-Rottluff, Rupert Stöckl, Werner Schreib, Ernst Weiers (Kurator Konrad Röthel)
- 1962 — Werner Gilles, HAP Grieshaber, Erich Heckel, Alfred Lörcher, Brigitte Meier-Denninghoff, Emil Schumacher (Curator: Konrad Röthel)
- 1964 — Joseph Fassbender, Norbert Kricke (Commissioner: Eduard Trier)
- 1966 — Horst Antes, Günter Haese, Ferdinand Ris (Commissioner: Eduard Trier)
- 1968 — Horst Janssen, Richard Oelze (Commissioner: Alfred Hentzen)
- 1970 — Kaspar-Thomas Lenk, Heinz Mack, Georg Karl Pfahler, Günther Uecker (Commissioner: Dieter Honisch)
- 1972 — Gerhard Richter (Commissioner: Dieter Honisch)
- 1976 — Joseph Beuys, Jochen Gerz, Reiner Ruthenbeck (Commissioner: Klaus Gallwitz)
- 1978 — Dieter Krieg, Ulrich Rückriem (Commissioner: Klaus Gallwitz)
- 1980 — Georg Baselitz, Anselm Kiefer (Commissioner: Klaus Gallwitz)
- 1982 — Hanne Darboven, Gotthard Graubner, Wolfgang Laib (Commissioner: Johannes Cladders)
- 1984 — Lothar Baumgarten, A. R. Penck (Commissioner: Johannes Cladders)
- 1986 — Sigmar Polke (Commissioner: Dierk Stemmler)
- 1988 — Felix Droese (Commissioner: Dierk Stemmler)
- 1990 — Bernd and Hilla Becher, Reinhard Mucha (Commissioner: Klaus Bußmann)
- 1993 — Hans Haacke, Nam June Paik (Commissioner: Klaus Bußmann)
- 1995 — Katharina Fritsch, Martin Honert, Thomas Ruff (Commissioner: Jean-Christophe Ammann)
- 1997 — Gerhard Merz, Katharina Sieverding (Commissioner: Gudrun Inboden)
- 1999 — Rosemarie Trockel (Commissioner: Gudrun Inboden)
- 2001 — Gregor Schneider (Commissioner: Udo Kittelmann)
- 2003 — Candida Höfer, Martin Kippenberger (Curator: Julian Heynen)
- 2005 — Thomas Scheibitz, Tino Sehgal (Curator: Julian Heynen)
- 2007 — Isa Genzken (Curator: Nicolaus Schafhausen)
- 2009 — Liam Gillick (Curator: Nicolaus Schafhausen)
- 2011 — Christoph Schlingensief (Curator: Susanne Gaensheimer)
- 2013 — Ai Weiwei, Romuald Karmakar, Santu Mofokeng, Dayanita Singh (Curator: Susanne Gaensheimer) [Exhibition was held at the French pavilion]
- 2015 — Tobias Zielony, Hito Steyerl, Olaf Nicolai, Jasmina Metwaly and Philip Rizk (Curator: Florian Ebner)
- 2017 — Anne Imhof (Curator: Susanne Pfeffer)- (Winner of the Golden Lion for "Best National Participation")
- 2019 — Natascha Sadr Haghighian (Curator: Franciska Zólyom)
- 2022 — Maria Eichhorn (Curator: Yilmaz Dziewior)
- 2026 — Henrike Naumann, Sung Tieu (Curator: Kathleen Reinhardt)

== Bibliography ==
- Russeth, Andrew (April 17, 2019). "The Venice Biennale: Everything You Could Ever Want to Know". ARTnews.
- Volpi, Cristiana (2013). "Germany". In Re Rebaudengo, Adele (ed.). Pavilions and Garden of Venice Biennale. Rome: Contrasto. p. 182. ISBN 978-88-6965-440-4.
