= List of national pavilions at the 58th Venice Biennale =

Ninety national pavilions participated in the 58th Venice Biennale, an international contemporary art exhibition held between May and November 2019. The Venice Biennale takes place biennially in Venice, Italy, and participating nations select artists to show at their pavilions, hosted in the Venice Giardini, Arsenale, and palazzos throughout the city. The 90 pavilions set a new record for national participation, exceeding the 86 from 2017. Highlight pavilions from the show included Lithuania, Ghana, France, the United States, the Philippines, India, Brazil, and Italy.

== National pavilions ==
Nation	Location	Artist(s)	Curator(s)	Ref
Australia	Giardini	Angelica Mesiti	Juliana Engberg	
Austria	Giardini	Renate Bertlmann	Felicitas Thun-Hohenstein	
Belgium	Giardini	Jos de Gruyter & Harald Thys	Anne-Claire Schmitz	
Brazil	Giardini	Bárbara Wagner & Benjamin de Burca	Gabriel Pérez-Barreiro	
Canada	Giardini	Inuit artist collective Isuma (Zacharias Kunuk, Norman Cohn, Paul Apak Angilirq, and Pauloosie Qulitalik)	Asinnajaq, Catherine Crowston, Barbara Fischer, Candice Hopkins, and Josée Drouin-Brisebois	
Czech Republic and Slovakia	Giardini	Stanislav Kolíbal	Dieter Bogner	
Denmark	Giardini	Larissa Sansour	Nat Muller	
Egypt	Giardini	Islam Abdullah, Ahmed Chiha, and Ahmed Abdel Karim	Ahmed Chiha	
Finland	Giardini	Miracle Workers Collective (Maryan Abdulkarim, Khadar Ahmed, Hassan Blasim, Giovanna Esposito Yussif, Sonya Lindfors, Bonaventure Soh Bejeng Ndikung, Leena Pukki, Lorenzo Sandoval, Martta Tuomaala, Christopher L. Thomas, Christopher Wessels, and Suvi West)	Giovanna Esposito Yussif, Bonaventure Soh Bejeng Ndikung, and Christopher Wessels	
France	Giardini	Laure Prouvost	Martha Kirszenbaum	
Germany	Giardini	Natascha Süder Happelmann (Natascha Sadr Haghighian)	Franciska Zólyom	
Great Britain	Giardini	Cathy Wilkes	Zoe Whitley	
Greece	Giardini	Panos Charalambous, Eva Stefani, and Zafos Xagoraris	Katerina Tselou	
Hungary	Giardini	Tamás Waliczky	Zsuzsanna Szegedy-Maszák	
Israel	Giardini	Aya Ben Ron	Avi Lubin	
Japan	Giardini	Motoyuki Shitamichi, Taro Yasuno, Toshiaki Ishikura, and Fuminori Nousaku	Hiroyuki Hattori	
Korea	Giardini	Hwayeon Nam, Siren Eun Young Jung, and Jane Jin Kaisen	Hyunjin Kim	
The Netherlands	Giardini	Remy Jungerman and Iris Kensmil	Benno Tempel	
Nordic Pavilion	Giardini	Artist duo Maria Teeri & Janne Nabb, a.k.a. nabbteeri, from Finland; Ane Graff from Norway; and Ingela Ihrman from Sweden	Piia Oksanen and Leevi Haapala	
Poland	Giardini	Roman Stańczak	Łukasz Mojsak and Łukasz Ronduda	
Romania	Giardini	Belu-Simion Făinaru, Dan Mihălțianu, and Miklós Onucsán	Cristian Nae	
Russia	Giardini	Alexander Sokurov and Alexander Shishkin-Hokusai	Mikhail Piotrovsky, The State Hermitage Museum	
Serbia	Giardini	Djordje Ozbolt	Nicoletta Lambertucci	
Spain	Giardini	Itziar Okariz and Sergio Prego	Peio Aguirre	
Switzerland	Giardini	Pauline Boudry & Renate Lorenz	Charlotte Laubard	
United States	Giardini	Martin Puryear – Liberty/Libertà	Brooke Kamin Rapaport	
Uruguay	Giardini	Yamandú Canosa	David Armengol and Patricia Bentancur	
Venezuela	Giardini	Natalie Rocha Capiello, Ricardo García, Gabriel López, and Nelson Rangelosky	Oscar Sottillo Meneses	
Albania	Arsenale	Driant Zeneli	Alicia Knock	
Argentina	Arsenale	Mariana Telleria	Florencia Battiti	
Chile	Arsenale	Voluspa Jarpa	Agustín Pérez Rubio	
China	Arsenale	Chen Qi, Feijun, He Xiangyu, and Geng Xue	Wu Hongliang	
Georgia	Arsenale	Anna K.E.	Margot Norton	
Ghana	Arsenale	Felicia Abban, John Akomfrah, El Anatsui, Lynette Yiadom-Boakye, Ibrahim Mahama, and Selasi Awusi Sosu – Ghana Freedom	Nana Oforiatta Ayim	
India	Arsenale	Nandalal Bose, Atul Dodiya, GR Iranna, Rummana Hussain, Jitish Kallat, Shakuntala Kulkarni, and Ashim Purkayastha	Roobina Karode	
Indonesia	Arsenale	Handiwirman Saputra and Syagini Ratna Wulan	Asmudjo Jono Irianto; co-curated by Yacobus Ari Respati	
Ireland	Arsenale	Eva Rothschild	Mary Cremin	
Italy	Arsenale	Enrico David, Chiara Fumai, and Liliana Moro	Milovan Farronato	
Kosovo	Arsenale	Alban Muja	Vincent Honore	
Latvia	Arsenale	Daiga Grantiņa	Valentinas Klimašauskas and Inga Lāce	
Luxembourg	Arsenale	Marco Godinho	Kevin Muhlen	
Madagascar	Arsenale	Joël Andrianomearisoa	Rina Ralay-Ranaivo and Emmanuel Daydé	
Malta	Arsenale	Vince Briffa, Klitsa Antoniou, and Trevor Borg	Hesperia Iliadou Suppiej	
Mexico	Arsenale	Pablo Vargas Lugo	Magalí Arriola	
Peru	Arsenale	Christian Bendayán, Otto Michael, Manuel Rodríguez Lira, Segundo Candiño Rodríguez, and Anonymous popular artificer	Gustavo Buntinx	
Philippines	Arsenale	Mark Justiniani	Tessa Maria Guazon	
Saudi Arabia	Arsenale	Zahrah Al Ghamdi	Eiman Elgibreen	
Singapore	Arsenale	Song-Ming Ang	Michelle Ho	
Slovenia	Arsenale	Marko Peljhan	Igor Španjol	
South Africa (Republic of)	Arsenale	Dineo Seshee Bopape, Tracey Rose, and Mawande Ka Zenzile	Nkule Mabaso and Nomusa Makhubu	
Turkey	Arsenale	İnci Eviner	Zeynep Öz	
Ukraine	Arsenale		Open Group (Yurii Biley, Pavlo Kovach, Stanislav Turina, and Anton Varga)	
United Arab Emirates	Arsenale	Nujoom Alghanem	Sam Bardaouil and Till Fellrath	
Andorra	Around Venice	Philippe Shangti	Ivan Sansa and Paolo De Grandis	
Antigua and Barbuda	Around Venice	Timothy Payne, Sir Gerald Price, Joseph Seaton, and Frank Walter; Intangible Cultural Heritage Artisans and Mas Troupe Designers	Barbara Paca with Nina Khrushcheva	
Armenia	Around Venice	"ArtlabYerevan" Artistic Group (Gagik Charchyan, Hovhannes Margaryan, Arthur Petrosyan, and Vardan Jaloyan) and Narine Arakelian	Susanna Gyulamiryan	
Azerbaijan (Republic of)	Around Venice	Zeigam Azizov, Orkhan Mammadov, Zarnishan Yusifova, Kanan Aliyev, and Ulviyya Aliyeva	Giovanni Mercurio and Emin Mammadov	
Bangladesh (People's Republic of)	Around Venice	Bishwajit Goswami, Dilara Begum Jolly, Heidi Fosli, Nafis Ahmed Gazi, Franco Marrocco, Domenico Pellegrino, Preema Nazia Andaleeb, Ra Kajol, and Uttam Kumar	Mokhlesur Rahman and Viviana Vannucci	
Belarus (Republic of)	Around Venice	Konstantin Selikhanov	Olga Rybchinskaya	
Bosnia and Herzegovina	Around Venice	Danica Dakić	Anja Bogojević, Amila Puzić, and Claudia Zini	
Bulgaria	Around Venice	Rada Boukova and Lazar Lyutakov	Vera Mlechevska	
Catalonia	Around Venice	Marcel Borràs with Albert García-Alzórriz and the collaboration of David Bestué, Lua Coderch Lola Lasurt Daniela Ortiz Perejaume Francesc Torres	Pedro Azara	
Croatia	Around Venice	Igor Grubić	Katerina Gregos	
Cuba	Around Venice	Alejandro Campins, Alex Hérnandez, Ariamna Contino, and Eugenio Tibaldi	Margarita Sanchez Prieto	
Cyprus	Around Venice	Christoforos Savva (1924–1968)	Jacopo Crivelli Visconti	
Dominican (Republic)	Around Venice	Dario Oleaga, Ezequiel Taveras, Hulda Guzmán, Julio Valdez, Miguel Ramirez, Rita Bertrecchi, Nicola Pica, and Marraffa & Casciotti	Marianne de Tolentino, Simone Pieralice, and Giovanni Verza	
Estonia	Giudecca	Kris Lemsalu	Andrew Berardini, Irene Campolmi, Sarah Lucas, and Tamara Luuk	
Grenada	Around Venice	Amy Cannestra, Billy Gerard Frank, Dave Lewis, Shervone Neckles, Franco Rota Candiani, Roberto Miniati, and CRS avant-garde (Carlo Caldara, Paolo Rossetto, and Giovanni Scagnoli)	Daniele Radini Tedeschi	
Guatemala	Around Venice	Elsie Wunderlich and Marco Manzo	Stefania Pieralice	
Haiti	Around Venice	Jean Ulrick Désert	Giscard Bouchotte	
Hong Kong	Around Venice	Shirley Tse	Christina Li	
Iceland	Around Venice	Shoplifter (Hrafnhildur Arnardóttir)	Birta Guðjónsdóttir	
Iran (Islamic Republic of)	Around Venice	Reza Lavassani, Samira Alikhanzadeh, and Ali Meer Azimi	Ehsan Aghaei	
Iraq	Around Venice	Serwan Baran	Tamara Chalabi and Paolo Colombo	
Ivory Coast	Around Venice	Ernest Dükü, Ananias Leki Dago, Valérie Oka, and Tong Yanrunan	Massimo Scaringella	
Kiribati	Around Venice	Kaeka Michael Betero, Daniela Danica Tepes, Kairaken Betio Group; Teroloang Borouea, Neneia Takoikoi, Tineta Timirau, Teeti Aaloa, Kenneth Ioane, Kaumai Kaoma, Runita Rabwaa, Obeta Taia, Tiribo Kobaua, Tamuera Tebebe, Rairauea Rue, Teuea Kabunare, Tokintekai Ekentetake, Katanuti Francis, Mikaere Tebwebwe, Terita Itinikarawa, Kaeua Kobaua, Raatu Tiuteke, Kaeriti Baanga, Ioanna Francis, Temarewe Banaan, Aanamaria Toom, Einako Temewi, Nimei Itinikarawa, Teniteiti Mikaere, Aanibo Bwatanita, and Arin Tikiraua	Kautu Tabaka and Nina Tepes	
Lithuania	Around Venice	Rugilė Barzdžiukaitė, Vaiva Grainytė, and Lina Lapelyte	Lucia Pietroiusti	
Malaysia	Around Venice	Anurendra Jegadeva, H.H.Lim, Ivan Lam, and Zulkifli Yusoff	Lim Wei-Ling Esme	
Mongolia	Around Venice	Jantsankhorol Erdenebayar, traditional Mongolian throat singers, and Carsten Nicolai	Gantuya Badamgarav	
Montenegro	Around Venice	Vesko Gagović	Petrica Duletić	
Mozambique (Republic of)	Around Venice	Gonçalo Mabunda, Mauro Pinto, and Filipe Branquinho	Lidija K. Khachatourian	
New Zealand	Around Venice	Dane Mitchell	Zara Stanhope and Chris Sharp	
North Macedonia (Republic of)	Around Venice	Nada Prlja	Jovanka Popova	
Pakistan	Around Venice	Naiza Khan	Zahra Khan	
Portugal	Around Venice	Leonor Antunes	João Ribas	
San Marino (Republic of)	Around Venice	Gisella Battistini, Martina Conti, Gabriele Gambuti, Giovanna Fra, Thea Tini, Chen Chengwei, Li Geng, Dario Ortiz, Tang Shuangning, Jens W. Beyrich, Xing Junqin, Xu de Qi, and Sebastián	Vincenzo Sanfo (Martina Conti project curated by Alessandro Castiglioni and Emma Zanella)	
Scotland	Around Venice	Charlotte Prodger	Linsey Young with Cove Park (artist residency)	
Seychelles (Republic of)	Around Venice	George Camille and Daniel Dodin	Martin Kennedy	
Syrian Arab (Republic)	Around Venice	Abdalah Abouassali, Giacomo Braglia, Ibrahim Al Hamid, Chen Huasha, Saed Salloum, Xie Tian, Saad Yagan, Primo Vanadia, and Giuseppe Biasio	Emad Kashout	
Taiwan	Around Venice	Shu Lea Cheang	Paul B. Preciado	
Thailand	Around Venice	Somsak Chowtadapong, Panya Vijinthanasarn, and Krit Ngamsom	Tawatchai Somkong	
Wales	Around Venice	Sean Edwards	Marie-Anne McQuay	
Zimbabwe	Around Venice	Georgina Maxim, Neville Starling, Cosmos Shiridzinomwa, and Kudzanai Violet Hwami	Raphael Chikukwa	
