= National Theatre Wales =

Theatre company in Wales (2009–2024)

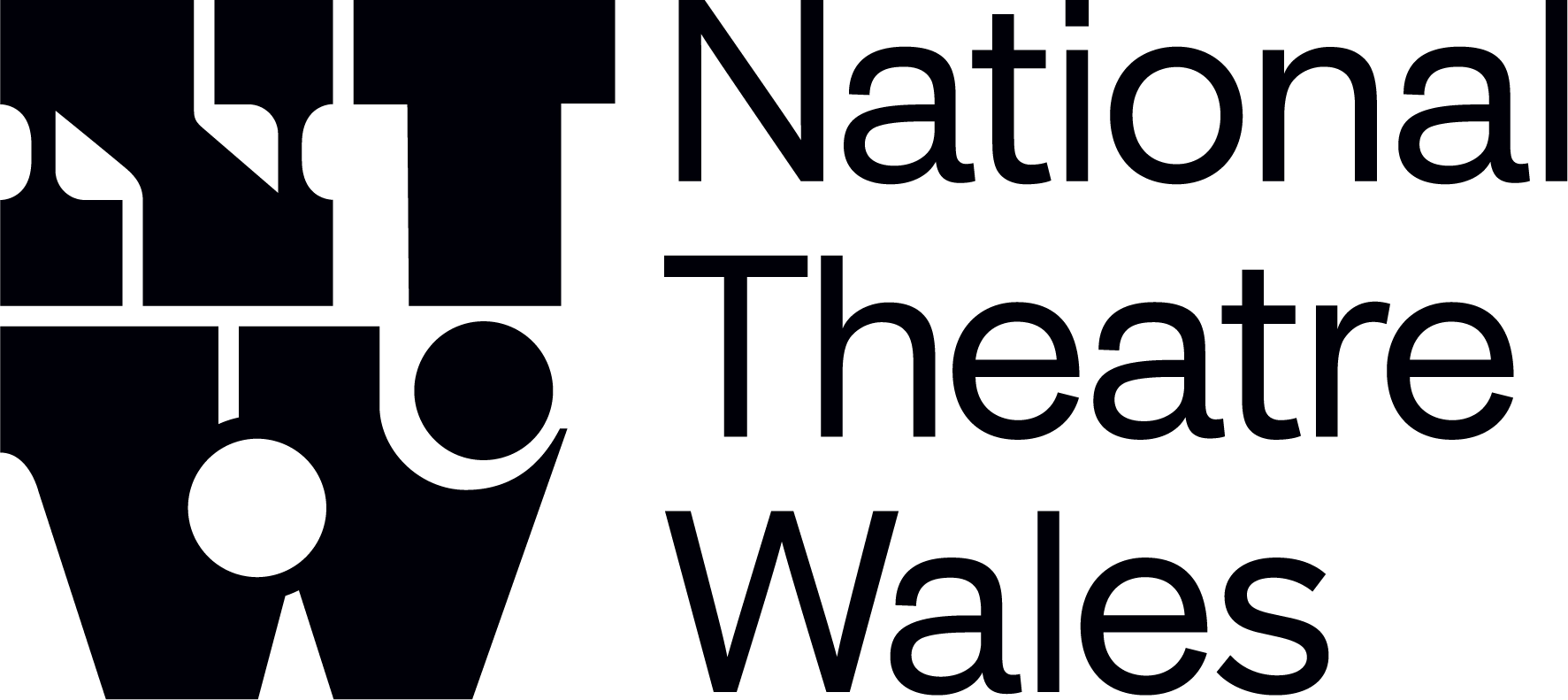
- Formation: May 2009
- Dissolved: December 2024
- Headquarters: Cardiff, Wales
- Official language: English
- Website: nationaltheatrewales.org

National Theatre Wales (NTW) was a charity and theatre company based in Wales. It was established in 2009, but following the cessation of funding in April 2024, it closed in December 2024, with its community work being carried on and restructured into two charitable organisations: TEAM Collective Cymru and Welsh National Theatre (WNT).

== Background ==
The National Theatre of Wales, known as National Theatre Wales (NTW), was founded in 2007 following an agreement between the Welsh Government and Plaid Cymru, aimed at establishing an English-language national theatre for Wales.

Over many decades, there were several attempts to establish such a theatre. Finally, a consensus emerged, bringing together the political will and muscle of both Labour and Plaid Cymru, the consistent advocacy of key individuals within Arts Council of Wales (ACW), and a shared understanding among the informed public that the formation of the company was imperative and time-sensitive. This collaborative effort culminated in the inception of National Theatre Wales in 2007, made possible through the "One Wales Agreement", which allocated additional funding under Arts Council Wales’ jurisdiction to facilitate its establishment and continued operation.

In 2018, 40 Welsh dramatists signed an open letter criticising the company, calling for it to reform, particularly limiting itself to only produce theatre. The letter expressed concern with the company's "lack of scrutiny, transparency and openness", leading to a "worrying internal culture" claimed to diminish its "theatrical identity" and even its Welshness.

On 27 September 2023, the Arts Council of Wales announced that revenue funding for the company would cease from April 2024.

Following the loss in funding, the theatre closed in December 2024. NTW then transitioned into TEAM Collective Cymru, and ACW claimed that "NTW's board subsequently requested that £200,000 of its remaining ~~£~~226,000 Transition Funding be transferred to WNT to deliver activity align with the original funding purpose." On 10 June 2026, TEAM Collective Cymru closed entirely due to “unavoidable circumstances".

It has a counterpart in Theatr Cymru, the Welsh-language national theatre company of Wales founded in 2003.

== Remit ==
National Theatre Wales plays a central role within the Welsh theatre sector ecosystem. It has three core areas of work aiming to place the Welsh people at the heart of the theatre they make:

- TEAM, NTW’s approach to collaboration, delivers activity by, with and for communities including schools, young people outside mainstream education, arts groups, charities and health boards. It brings theatre and the arts to people who may never have believed it could be for them.
- NTW offers a creative development programme of opportunities for theatre-makers including professional development, residencies, networking, mentoring and commission funding;
- NTW creates productions inside and outside traditional theatre spaces.

NTW is also the co-originator and co-custodian of the Theatre Green Book in collaboration with the National Theatre and National Theatre of Scotland. The Theatre Green Book is a globally recognised framework and innovator for delivering carbon-neutral theatre, and the initiative won The Stage Award for Innovation in 2022.

== Key people ==
=== Artistic directors ===
- John E. McGrath (2009–2015)
- Kully Thiarai (2016–2019)
- Lorne Campbell (2020–2024)

=== Chairs ===
- Phil George (2007–2016)
- Sir Clive Jones (2016–2023)
- Sharon Gilburd and Yvonne Connikie (2023–2026)

== Notable productions ==
Among the company’s productions are:

- The Persians (2010) by Kaite O’Reilly, Mike Pearson and Mike Brookes. A reimagining of one of Europe’s earliest recorded plays on a military training range in the Brecon Beacons, which won the 2010 Ted Hughes Award.
- The Passion (2011). A 72-hour secular passion play created by Michael Sheen, which won the UK Theatre Award for Best Director.
- The Radicalisation of Bradley Manning (2012) by Tim Price. A fictionalised account of whistleblower Chelsea Manning’s teenage years in Pembrokeshire, which won the 2013 James Tait Black Prize for Drama.
- CORIOLAN/US (2012) by Mike Pearson and Mike Brookes. A multimedia reimagining of Coriolanus in a World War II aircraft hangar in St Athan, produced with the Royal Shakespeare Company as part of the World Shakespeare Festival.
- In Water I’m Weightless (2012) by Kaite O’Reilly. A provocative exploration of disability and the human body combining movement and live projections, co-produced with Unlimited for the London 2012 Festival.
- De Gabay (2013). An immersive production created by a group of young Welsh-Somali performers in Butetown, Cardiff, which was shortlisted for a Gulbenkian award.
- Mametz (2014) by Owen Sheers. Play commissioned as part of 14-18 NOW, which transformed an ancient woodland near Usk, Monmouthshire into the trenches and battlefields of the Somme.
- The Gathering/Yr Helfa (2014) by National Poet of Wales, Gillian Clarke, and Louise Ann Wilson. An exploration of the annual cycle of sheep farming on a working hill farm on Snowdon.
- Bordergame (2014). An interactive production exploring migration and contemporary border regimes, which won the first Space Prize for Digital Innovation.
- Roald Dahl’s City of the Unexpected (2016). A Cardiff-wide celebration of Roald Dahl with 7,000 people performing, making and volunteering, billed as "Wales’ largest-ever cultural event."
- We’re Still Here (2017) by Rachel Trezise and the people of Port Talbot. A co-production with Common Wealth Theatre sited in a disused steelworks which won a 2018 Nesta/The Observer New Radicals Award.
- NHS70 (2018). A season of one-person plays celebrating the NHS taking place in intimate settings all over Wales, including new work by Maria Fusco, Alan Harris and Elis James.
- Tide Whisperer (2018) by Louise Wallwein. An acclaimed immersive production on the shores of Tenby tackling the global phenomenon of displacement and mass movement.
- On Bear Ridge (2019) by Ed Thomas. A co-production with Royal Court Theatre which was named one of the U.K.’s five best new plays of 2019 by The Stage.
- Refrain (2019) by Sean Edwards. A radio play produced with Wrexham’s Tŷ Pawb as part of the Wales in Venice presentation at the 58th Venice Biennale.
- Mission Control (2019). A fantasy musical co-produced with Hijinx Theatre and created with Seiriol Davies, staged at the Millennium Stadium.
- Petula (2022). A co-production with Theatr Genedlaethol Cymru and August 012 nominated for Best Show for Children and Young People at the UK Theatre Awards 2022.
- Circle of Fifths (2022 and 2023). An immersive theatre experience created with and by communities in Butetown, Cardiff.
- Feral Monster (2024). A new musical written by Bethan Marlow and directed by Izzy Rabey, with music by Nicola T. Chang.
