= Jung Jinho =

South Korean Writer and Illustrator of Children's books

- Born: March 7, 1987 (age 39); Daegu, South Korea
- Occupations: Author, illustrator
- Writing career
- Language: Korean
- Genre: Picture Books

Jung Jinho (born 1987 in Daegu, South Korea), a South Korean architect, author and illustrator. His picture book Look Up! won a mention in the Opera prima category at the 2015 Bologna Ragazzi Awards, and was selected as an IBBY Outstanding Book for Young People With Disabilities in 2017. He received a Special Mention in the Art - Architecture & Design category at the 2018 Bologna Ragazzi Awards with his book Wall. His best known works include Look Up!, Wall, Me and the Stars, 3-Second Diving, and The Fox Goblin.

== Life ==
Jung Jinho born in 1987 in Daegu Metropolitan City, South Korea, studied architecture at Hanyang University. Involved in an accident when he was two years old, he spent his childhood days in the hospital with picture books at his bedside. As a child, he frequented comic book rental shops with his sister, where girls’ romance comics nurtured his sensitive, artistic side. He majored in architecture at Hanyang University, but took his first step as a picture book author by exhibiting a pile of picture books instead of building models for his graduation thesis. He currently works as a picture book author and illustrator, building narrative structures within picture books. He lives in the city of Seongnam with his wife and two cats, and creates picture books and independent publications.

== Career ==
Jung Jinho completed his “architecture trilogy” picture books with Look up!, Wall, and Me and the Stars. His first picture book, Look Up!, won a mention in the Opera prima category at the 2015 Bologna Ragazzi Awards, and was selected as an IBBY Outstanding Book for Young People With Disabilities. He received a Special Mention in Art at the 2018 Bologna Ragazzi Awards with his book Wall.

== Style ==
The theme that runs through Jung Jinho’s artistic world is the human gaze. His three early picture books, Look Up!, Wall, and Me and the Stars, form a trilogy, composed of three architectural views: plan, section, and perspective. As can be seen in Me and the Stars, he is also adept at capturing small details that people tend to overlook. 3-Second Diving portrays the inner psyche of a child who is all too aware of his shortcomings, and Heartbeats tenderly cheers those who are taking one painstaking step forward at a time.

== Milestones ==
- 2022 Author Lecture at the Korean Pavilion, Bogota International Book Fair
- 2021 Meet the Author in Korean School, Korean Education Center, Chicago, USA
- 2020 “Future-ing” Author Interview, Korean Pavilion, Moscow International Book Fair
- 2019 Three Picture Book Authors in Conversation, Seoul International Book Fair

== Activities ==
- 2022 In My Heart: Everyone's Picture Books Exhibition, Hangaram Art Museum, Seoul Arts Center
- 2021 Bottari Vacance Exhibition, Pangyo Hyundai Museum of Kids’ Books & Art
- 2020 We Want to Play Exhibition, Wonju Munari Space 5.3
- 2019 Land of Fairy Tales, Land of Plants Exhibition, Um Museum
- 2018 Solo exhibition of artwork from Wall, Gerazine Gallery, Jeju-do
- 2016 Images That Tell a Story, Exhibition of Illustrations, Museum SAN
- 2016 Asian Story Festival Exhibition, Asian Cultural Center

== Awards ==
- 2020 Selected as one of The White Ravens by the Munich International Youth Library, Duck Stone Duck
- 2017 Selected as an IBBY Outstanding Book for Young People With Disabilities, Look Up!
- 2018 Special Mention in Art, Architecture & Design at the Bologna Ragazzi Awards, Wall
- 2016 Selected as Good Books for Everyone to Read (好書大家讀), Taiwan, Look Up!
- 2015 Selected as one of The White Ravens by the Munich International Youth Library, Look Up!
- 2015 Mention for Opera Prima at the Bologna Ragazzi Awards, Look Up!

== Works ==
=== Written and illustrated by Jung Jinho ===
- 2023 Fox Goblin (Bandal) ISBN 979-1192759753
- 2022 Protect My Moon (Gilbut Kids) ISBN 978-8955826746
- 2022 A Piece of the Sun (All & Only) ISBN 979-1190931687
- 2022 Heartbeats (Wisdom House) ISBN 978-8962478228
- 2022 Dream Muscles (Gilbut Kids) ISBN 978-8955826517
- 2018 Play With Me! (Hyeonam Junior) ISBN 978-8932374819
- 2018 3-Second Diving (Wisdom House) ISBN 978-8962479003
- 2017 Me and the Stars (BIR) ISBN 978-8949101897
- 2016 Wall (BIR) ISBN 978-8949101842
- 2014 Look Up! (Hyeonam Junior) ISBN 978-8932373706
  - 2020 往上看! Chinese Edition (Guangxi Normal University Press) ISBN 978-7559831095
  - 2018 Kijk naar boven! Nederlands Edition (Clavis) ISBN 978-9044833720
  - 2016 Look Up! English Edition (Holiday House) ISBN 978-0823436521
  - 2015 Regarde en haut! French Edition (Rue du Monde) ISBN 978-2355043871

=== Collaborations with other authors ===
- 2023 I’ll Never Go Fishing Again (Book Mentor) ISBN 978-8963190525
- 2022 How Does Imagination Work, Mr. Einstein? (Changbi) ISBN 978-8936455743
- 2021 Little Pond (Changbi) ISBN 978-8936455644
- 2020 Duck Stone Duck (Munhakdongne) ISBN 978-8954670715
- 2019 Daddy and Me (Gilbut Kids) ISBN 978-8955825367
- 2019 Hunting Lulu (Sigong Junior) ISBN 978-8952788993
- 2017 I See (Kids M) ISBN 978-8967498511
- 2017 Nar and the Snowman (BIR) ISBN 978-8949106021
- 2017 The Transparent Trees (Junior RHK) ISBN 978-8925560878
- 2015 Yellow Boots (Bandal) ISBN 978-8956186726
