= Ralph Rugoff =

Ralph Rugoff OBE
- Born: 12 January 1957; New York City, US
- Education: Brown University
- Occupation: Curator
- Known for: Curator of the 2019 Venice Biennale
- Title: Director of London's Hayward Gallery
- Term: 2006-

Ralph Rugoff OBE (born 12 January 1957) is an American-born curator, the director of London's Hayward Gallery since 2006, and the curator of the Venice Biennale in 2019.

Rugoff was born in New York City to a psychoanalyst, Evangeline Peterson, and Donald Rugoff, the film distributor and movie theater owner profiled in a 2019 film Searching for Mr. Rugoff. He studied semiotics at Brown University.

Rugoff was director of the Wattis Institute for Contemporary Arts in San Francisco for nearly six years, before becoming the director of London's Hayward Gallery.

Rugoff was artistic director of the 58th Venice Biennale in 2019.

He was appointed Officer of the Order of the British Empire (OBE) in the 2019 Birthday Honours for services to art.
