= Theatr Cymru =

Welsh-language national theatre company of Wales

- Former names: Theatr Genedlaethol Cymru
- Address: Yr Egin, Carmarthen, Wales

Construction
- Opened: 2003

Website
- theatr.cymru

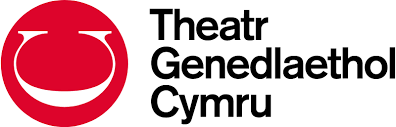
Former logo of the company until 2024.

Theatr Cymru, formerly Theatr Genedlaethol Cymru, is the Welsh-language national theatre company of Wales (Welsh: Cymru), and was founded in 2003.

The company is known for regularly touring a diverse range of theatre across the length and breadth Wales, including new writing, musicals, site-specific work, and classic plays.

The company won the UK Theatre Award 2024 for Excellence in Touring and was nominated as Producer of the Year in The Stage Awards 2024.

It has a large presence at the National Eisteddfod of Wales annually, usually presenting new plays. Theatr Cymru also tours beyond Wales, most recently to London with a bilingual Romeo and Juliet at Shakespeare's Globe and a tour to Tokyo and Hokkaido as part of Welsh Government's Year of Wales and Japan in 2025.

The company has developed a language access app, Sibrwd, for audience members with various levels of fluency in Welsh. By means of a voice in the ear and text on screen, the app conveys in English what is being said on stage, and is available to use on mobile phones.

Theatr Cymru launched a new partnership with S4C in 2024 to broadcast its productions on the television channel and streaming platforms S4C Clic, YouTube and BBC iPlayer.

Theatr Cymru shapes a distinctive identity for drama in Welsh while also opening it up to outside linguistic and dramatic influences. It had a counterpart in National Theatre Wales, the English language national theatre company of Wales, founded in 2009 but dissolved in 2024.

In 2024, the company rebranded itself with the shorter name Theatr Cymru.

== Artistic Directors ==
- Cefin Roberts (2003-2010)
- Arwel Gruffydd (2011-2022)
- Steffan Donnelly (2022-present)
