= Martin Puryear =

American sculptor

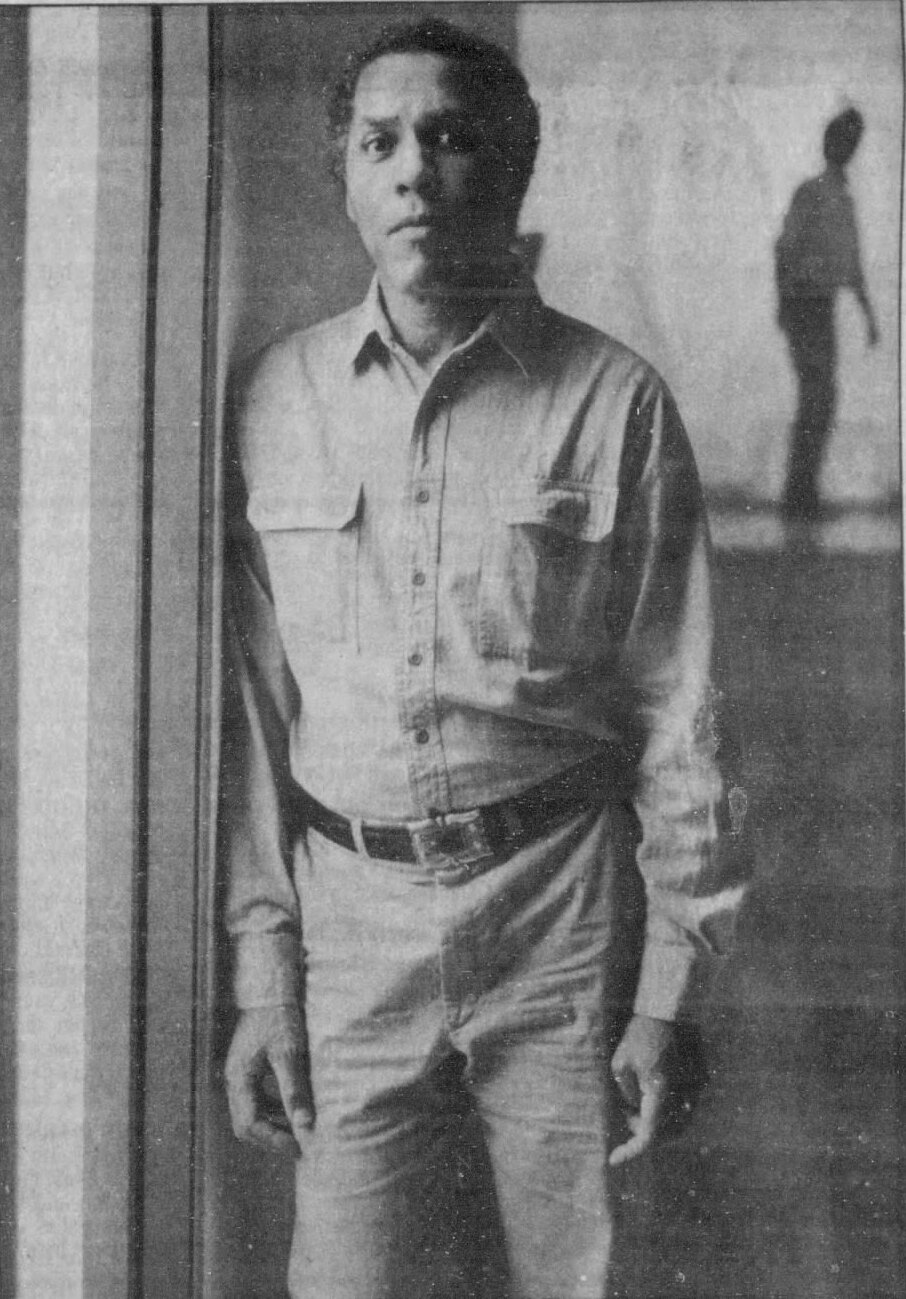
- Puryear in 1984
- Born: May 23, 1941 (age 85); Washington, D.C., United States
- Education: The Catholic University of America (BA); Yale University (MFA)
- Known for: Sculpture
- Awards: Guggenheim Fellowship; MacArthur Foundation Fellowship; Rome Prize; National Medal of Arts; J. Paul Getty Medal

Martin L. Puryear (born May 23, 1941) is an American artist known for his devotion to traditional craft. Working in a variety of media, but primarily wood, his reductive technique and meditative approach challenge the physical and poetic boundaries of his materials.

Puryear has participated in the Whitney Biennial three times and he has represented the United States multiple times with solo exhibitions at international biennials, including in 1989 at the São Paulo Biennial and in 2019 at the 58th Venice Biennale.

== Early life and education ==
Martin Puryear was born May 23, 1941, in Washington, D.C., to Reginald Puryear and Martina Puryear. His father and mother worked for the postal service and as a teacher, respectively. Puryear was the eldest of seven children, with four brothers and two sisters.

Puryear attended the racially segregated William Syphax Elementary School in southeast Washington in the years prior to the integration of D.C. Public Schools. He developed a strong interest in both nature and art at a young age, which his parents encouraged with art supplies and repeat visits to the National Gallery of Art, National Museum of Natural History, National Zoo, and National Museum of History and Technology (now the National Museum of American History). His first artworks were primarily drawings of birds and other animals. In the third grade, Puryear submitted a painting to a national contest run by the school-focused magazine Young America, coming fourth place for his depiction of an explorer surrounded by animals in a jungle. He also received a scholarship to study under local artist Cornelia Yuditsky in her children's art program at eight years old, which he continued for four years. In 1950, the family moved to Northeast Washington. Puryear enrolled at Archbishop Carroll High School, a Catholic school in the Brookland neighborhood, graduating in 1958. As a high school junior, he began working part-time at the District of Columbia Public Library.

After high school, Puryear enrolled at the District of Columbia Teachers College in the fall of 1958, primarily taking science courses. During this period he taught himself how to craft guitars, canoes, and furniture. He transferred to The Catholic University of America after two years, originally studying biology before switching to art as a junior with a focus on painting. While an undergraduate, he learned about the Washington Color School painters, including faculty member Kenneth Noland, though he initially dismissed abstract art in favor of realism, inspired by artists he admired like Andrew Wyeth, until his professor Nell B. Sonneman introduced him to concepts like the philosophy of art. He first showed his art outside of school in a group exhibition at the Adams Morgan Gallery in Washington in 1962, and the following year he showed two works in the Maryland Regional Exhibition at the Baltimore Museum of Art, winning the museum's purchase prize for one of his submissions. Puryear graduated from Catholic with a BA in art in 1963. He continued working at the public library throughout college to help pay for his education.

Following graduation, Puryear spent two years as a Peace Corps volunteer in Sierra Leone, from 1964 to 1966. He taught biology, English, and French to local students and studied traditional woodworking techniques with carpenters in the area, furthering his interest in working with the material. He also produced many drawings and woodcut prints of the local landscape and residents, and he participated in a group exhibition in 1965 at the U.S. embassy in Freetown organized by the U.S. Information Agency. From 1966 to 1968, he studied printmaking at the Royal Swedish Academy of Arts in Stockholm, funded by a grant from The American-Scandinavian Foundation. Originally inspired to apply to study in Stockholm by Scandinavian furniture traditions, Puryear continued making sculpture in his free time while developing his print skills in school, and he spent three weeks studying woodworking under furniture maker James Krenov, whose studio was located in the city. He exhibited his art several times while in Sweden, including at the Royal Academy's annual exhibitions in 1967 and 1968, and in his first solo exhibition at the Gröna Palletten Gallery in 1968.

After Puryear finished his studies in Stockholm in the spring of 1968, his brother Michael joined him for a two week backpacking trip above the Arctic Circle in the Sápmi region across Sweden and Norway. He traveled to the 34th Venice Biennale in Italy that summer and saw works by several minimalist American artists before returning to the United States, where he worked at first as a designer for the Scandinavian furniture company Scan Furniture. Puryear received a grant to enroll in the graduate program at the Yale School of Art in the fall of 1969, studying sculpture under, among others, Robert Morris, James Rosati, Salvatore Scarpitta, and Richard Serra. Though he did not take any painting courses, he became close with the painting faculty member Al Held. He also worked as a teaching assistant for sculptor Erwin Hauer for a semester. Puryear was largely dissatisfied with the minimalist art style and ethos prevailing among the nearby New York art world during this time, preferring to make his objects by hand. Puryear graduated from Yale in 1971 with an MFA in sculpture.

== Life and career ==
=== 1971–1979 ===
In 1971, Puryear was hired to teach at the historically black Fisk University in Tennessee, having been offered the position by art department chair David Driskell.

Puryear staged his first solo art exhibition in the United States in January 1972 at the Henri 2 Gallery in Washington. The show received positive coverage from local critics.

Puryear staged his second solo exhibition at Henri 2 Gallery in 1973. He also left Fisk in 1973 and moved to Williamsburg, Brooklyn. In 1974, he accepted a job offer at the University of Maryland, College Park, and began spending half of each week in both New York and Maryland.

In February 1977, the contents of Puryear's studio in Brooklyn were destroyed in a fire, including most of his early sculptures. Following the fire, he received an emergency assistance grant from the Robert Rauschenberg Foundation. Puryear moved to Chicago and began teaching at the University of Illinois. In the summer of 1977, Puryear developed an outdoor installation for Artpark in Niagara County, New York. His work, Box and Pole, consisted of a 100 foot tall wooden pole placed next a 54-inch wooden cube and opened to the public in August 1977. The same month, he opened a two-room exhibition at the Corcoran Gallery of Art in Washington, his first solo museum show. He exhibited a seventeen foot tall yurt-like wooden structure covered in animal hides that visitors could enter in the first room, along with a series of smaller sculptures in the second room. Puryear exhibited his work in New York for the first time in 1978, showing a sculpture at the Guggenheim Museum as part of a national group exhibition for young artists.

In 1979, Puryear was included in the Whitney Biennial at New York's Whitney Museum. He also staged a solo exhibition at Protetch-McIntosh Gallery in Washington in 1979, showing a number of circular sculptures hung flat on the wall, made of various types of wood. The same year, he completed an artist residency at Yaddo in upstate New York.

=== 1980–1989 ===
In 1980, Puryear opened a small solo exhibition at the Joslyn Art Museum in Nebraska. He exhibited five new wood and stone sculptures, all abstract variations of a form similar to a mound or shark's tooth. The same year, several of Puryear's wall-based wood circle sculptures were featured in the traveling group exhibition Afro-American Abstraction, a show exploring contemporary abstract art by African Americans, curated by April Kingsley and originating at the P.S. 1 Contemporary Art Center (Note: After closing in New York, Afro-American Abstraction traveled to the Everson Museum of Art in Syracuse, New York, the Los Angeles Municipal Art Gallery, the Oakland Museum in Oakland, California, the Brooks Memorial Art Gallery in Memphis, Tennessee, the South Bend Art Center in South Bend, Indiana, the Toledo Museum of Art in Toledo, Ohio, the Bellevue Arts Museum in Bellevue, Washington, the Laguna Gloria Art Museum in Austin, Texas, and the Mississippi Museum of Art in Jackson, Mississippi.) in New York. He participated in the Whitney Biennial again in 1981.

Puryear staged a solo exhibition in February 1982 at Washington's McIntosh/Drysdale Gallery, showing new circular, wall-based works made of wood. Most of the sculptures comprised partial or imperfect circles hung on the wall, each with different stained or painted surface techniques and colors. During the Summer of 1982, Puryear worked on a commission for Gettysburg College in Pennsylvania, creating a permanent public sculpture commemorating the university's 150th anniversary, which was unveiled in October 1982. His commissioned sculpture, Sentinel, a large wall-like concrete and stone form with rocks embedded in its surface, was funded in part by a grant from the National Endowment for the Arts. Also that Summer, he completed a commission for Governors State University in Illinois, building a large-scale land art piece titled Bodark Arc. The work consisted of two pathways in the form of a broad arc bisected by a straight line, with each path leading to a cast bronze chair sculpture. Puryear was also awarded a John S. Guggenheim Memorial Foundation Grant in 1982.

In 1983, Puryear completed Knoll for NOAA, a commission for a park on the site of a NOAA facility near Seattle. The work consisted of a dome of concrete forty-five feet in diameter and rising to a height of five feet, covered in a spiral double helix pattern made of glass pieces and surrounded by four curved concrete benches and maple trees. He travelled to Japan in October 1983 using funds from his Guggenheim grant, where he studied religious and residential architecture as well as traditional Japanese crafts.

The University Gallery at the University of Massachusetts Amherst (Note: After closing in Amherst, the exhibition traveled to the Berkshire Museum in Pittsfield, Massachusetts, the National Center of Afro-American Artists in Roxbury, Massachusetts, the New Museum in New York, and the La Jolla Museum of Contemporary Art in San Diego. The exhibition received reviews in The Berkshire Eagle, The Boston Globe, The New York Times, Artforum, the Los Angeles Times, and The Blade-Tribune.) organized the first traveling museum survey of Puryear's work in 1984, exhibiting his art from the previous ten years. The same year, Puryear was included in the group exhibition "Primitivism" in 20th Century Art at the Museum of Modern Art in New York, a controversial exhibition aiming to explore the connections between 20th century western art and mainly non-western, so-called primitive art. He showed a large wall piece made of wire, his first wall-based work in that material.

In January 1985, Puryear opened his first solo exhibition in Los Angeles at Margo Leavin Gallery, showing a range of new sculptures including works from his Boy's Toys series, all comprising small wooden forms attached to wooden rods, which several critics visually compared to phalluses or toilet plungers. He exhibited several of his Boy's Toys sculptures in a solo show in August 1985 at the University Art Museum, Berkeley, as part of the museum's MATRIX exhibition series. Puryear staged a solo exhibition at Chicago's Donald Young Gallery in October 1985. He presented the show across two gallery locations, exhibiting wall-based sculptures in one gallery and several large freestanding works in a separate location. The same year, he completed a commission for the River Road station in Chicago, permanently installing River Road Ring. The work, a monumental wooden circle sculpture, was suspended from the ceiling in the station's open atrium. Also in 1985, Puryear submitted a final design for a commission titled Arc at York College in Queens. The sculpture, completed in the ensuing three years, comprised a large skeletal form of copper tubes suspended from the ceiling in a long, narrow space in the college's interior walking mall.

In 1986, Puryear married Jeanne Gordon, an artist and classical pianist. The Chicago Cultural Center organized a ten-year survey of Puryear's work in February 1987. He opened a solo exhibition in April 1987 at the Carnegie Mellon University Art Gallery in Pittsburgh, showing several sculptures and drawings. In September 1987, Puryear presented another solo show at Donald Young Gallery in Chicago, primarily centered around a monumental work stretching 30 feet across the gallery, comprising a skeletal cone made from reeds attached to an oblong form of wire mesh covered in tar. He staged a solo show at New York's McKee Gallery in November 1987, his first commercial gallery show in the city.

Puryear opened a solo exhibition at McIntosh/Drysdale Gallery in Washington in March 1988, his first in the city in over five years. He showed several wall-based wood sculptures crafted so the thinned wood appeared to flow like a liquid. In October 1988, he participated in a four-artist show at the Corcoran Gallery of Art in Washington as part of the Spectrum exhibition series, showing a new bird-like iron sculpture as well as several older works. He was commissioned by New York's Brooklyn Museum in November 1988 to create an installation for the museum's large atrium, reworking two previous monumental wood and mixed media pieces, one vertical and one horizontal, to fit the tall space. Puryear also completed a commission for the newly opened Minneapolis Sculpture Garden in 1988 titled Ampersand, comprising two large tapered granite columns, one upside down and one right side up, which framed an entrance to the garden.

Puryear staged another solo exhibition at Margo Leavin Gallery in L.A. in April 1989, showing a number of new wood sculptures. He was also included in the Whitney Biennial again in April 1989. In July 1989, Puryear was awarded the MacArthur Foundation Fellowship.

In October 1989, Puryear represented the United States at the São Paulo Biennial in Brazil, becoming the first black artist to represent the United States with a solo show at a major international biennial. His presentation, curated by Kellie Jones and featuring nine large sculptures mostly made of wood, was awarded the grand prize of the biennial.

=== 1990–1999 ===
In 1990, Puryear was the inaugural participant in the Museum of Fine Arts, Boston's Connections exhibitions series, creating new work in response to art from the museum's collection. Taking inspiration from a 17th-century painting of a falcon, he built a wooden yurt structure with gridded wooden slats, surrounded by abstract birdlike works made from wood, iron, bronze, and rawhide, all arranged on ledges on the walls.

The Art Institute of Chicago (Note: After closing in Chicago, the retrospective traveled to the Hirshhorn Museum and Sculpture Garden in Washington, D.C., the Museum of Contemporary Art, Los Angeles, and the Philadelphia Museum of Art. The show received reviews in the Chicago Tribune, The New York Times, The Washington Post, The Baltimore Sun, Artforum, the Los Angeles Times, LA Weekly, Newsweek, the Chicago Reader, Time magazine, The Nation, The Philadelphia Inquirer, The Times of Northwest Indiana, the Asbury Park Press, and the San Francisco Chronicle.) mounted a twenty-year traveling retrospective of Puryear's art in 1991, featuring forty works. The same year, Puryear was introduced to the choreographer Garth Fagan and began a collaboration on Fagan's dance work Griot New York. Puryear designed the elaborate sculptural wooden sets for the piece, a reflection on the African diasporic community and culture of New York City, which premiered at the Brooklyn Academy of Music in December 1991. He participated in Documenta 9 in Kassel, Germany, in June 1992, installing a sculpture of a chained animal in a cage.

Puryear staged a solo exhibition in March 1995 at McKee Gallery, his first in New York since 1987. He showed four new sculptures, including several bulbous circular wood sculptures and a tall columnar work. Also in 1995, Puryear completed a commission in Battery Park City, installing two large stainless steel pylon sculptures on the shoreline at the North Cove Marina.

In 1996, Puryear completed a commission for Wanås Konst, an outdoor sculpture park in a forest at Sweden's Wanås Castle. His sculpture Meditation in a Beech Forest consisted of a 16 foot tall abstract biomorphic form covered in a thatch material traditionally used for roofs in the region. He completed another commission in 1997 at the University of Washington's physics and astronomy buildings, installing Everything that Rises, a monumental abstract bronze sculpture shaped like an elongated hourglass. Also in 1997, The New School opened a new courtyard plaza in Greenwich Village designed by Puryear in collaboration with Michael Van Valkenburgh. The space featured benches by Puryear made from metal, granite, and wood, as well as extensive landscaping and tree plantings. He also staged a solo exhibition of 30 works in Spain at the CaixaForum Madrid in 1997.

Puryear was commissioned by the federal General Services Administration in the mid-1990s to create a sculpture for the new Ronald Reagan Building in Washington's Federal Triangle area, although work was temporarily suspended on the project in 1996 amidst a budget shortfall. His work Bearing Witness, a monumental abstract bronze sculpture, was completed in 1998 and permanently installed in a plaza outside the building.

In 1999, Puryear completed That Profile, a public sculpture commissioned for the Getty Center in Los Angeles. The work, installed at the arrival plaza for the museum's tram system, comprises a tall, oblong skeletal form made of long steel tubes joined with bronze. In November 1999, he completed a commission in the Chapelle Saint-Louis de la Salpêtrière, for the Festival d'automne à Paris, an annual arts festival in Paris. His commissioned installation, This Mortal Coil, consisted of a monumental wooden spiral form within a wooden frame, displayed in the circular chapel building.

=== 2000–2009 ===
In 2000, Puryear collaborated with Arion Press to design a deluxe reissue of the novel Cane, originally published at the beginning of the Harlem Renaissance, after meeting Arion's founder Andrew Hoyem at a print fair. Puryear designed a multi-toned wooden slipcase for the book and seven abstract woodcut prints that were bound in each copy.

Puryear staged a traveling survey in 2001 at the Virginia Museum of Fine Arts in Richmond, Virginia, (Note: After closing in Richmond, the exhibition traveled to the Miami Art Museum, the Berkeley Art Museum and Pacific Film Archive in Berkeley, California, and the Des Moines Art Center in Des Moines, Iowa. It was originally scheduled to travel to the Seattle Art Museum but that tour stop was canceled. The show received reviews in The Washington Post, the Miami Herald, the San Francisco Chronicle, The Kansas City Star, and the International Review of African American Art.) exhibiting twelve large sculptures. He staged a solo exhibition at McKee Gallery in New York in 2002, showing four new wood sculptures.

In the early 2000s, Puryear served as a jury member for the competition to design the September 11 Memorial in New York, which announced a winning design in January 2004. He opened a survey exhibition at the Irish Museum of Modern Art in Dublin in 2004, his first solo exhibition in the country, presenting sculptures from the previous two decades. In 2006, he mounted a solo show at Donald Young Gallery in Chicago, his first exhibition in the city in fourteen years.

New York's Museum of Modern Art (Note: After closing in New York, the retrospective traveled to the Modern Art Museum of Fort Worth in Fort Worth, Texas, the National Gallery of Art in Washington, D.C., and the San Francisco Museum of Modern Art. The show received reviews in Artforum, The Washington Post, the San Francisco Chronicle, The Sacramento Bee, The Boston Globe, The New York Times, The New Yorker, Time magazine, The Nation, The New Criterion, Art in America, Sculpture magazine, The Burlington Magazine, Modern Painters, ArtUS, and art press.) organized a traveling thirty-year retrospective in 2007 of Puryear's work. The same year, the American Academy of Arts and Letters awarded Puryear its gold medal for sculpture.

=== 2010–2019 ===
In 2012, president Barack Obama awarded Puryear the National Medal of Arts. Puryear also mounted another solo show at McKee Gallery in 2012, exhibiting around a dozen new sculptures, including several that appeared like wheeled wooden carts.

Puryear staged a solo exhibition at Matthew Marks Gallery in New York in 2014. He showed nine new sculptures and two works on paper, all visually based on the phrygian cap, a well-known symbol of freedom and emancipation from slavery. The same year, he completed work on Slavery Memorial at Brown University, a stone and iron sculpture of broken chain links permanently installed on the school's campus.

In 2015, the Morgan Library & Museum (Note: After closing in New York, the exhibition traveled to the Art Institute of Chicago (the organizing institution), and the Smithsonian American Art Museum in Washington, D.C. The exhibition received reviews in The Wall Street Journal, The New York Times, The Brooklyn Rail, The Washington Post, ARTnews, Hyperallergic, and Art in Print.) in New York premiered a traveling exhibition of Puryear's drawings and works on paper, titled Martin Puryear: Multiple Dimensions.

Puryear installed Big Bling, a monumental wood, fiberglass, and gold leaf sculpture, in New York's Madison Square Park (Note: After going off view in New York, the sculpture was subsequently temporarily reinstalled in Fairmount Park in Philadelphia, and at the Massachusetts Museum of Contemporary Art in North Adams, Massachusetts.) in 2016 for several months as part of the park's public art program. The sculpture consisted of a forty foot tall skeletal wooden form covered with a chainlink fence, topped with a massive gold shackle.

In 2017, he staged a forty-year retrospective of more than thirty works at London's Parasol Unit Foundation for Contemporary Art, his first solo show at a nonprofit institution in the United Kingdom.

Puryear represented the United States at the 58th Venice Biennale in 2019 with an exhibition commissioned by Brooke Kamin Rapaport, senior curator of Madison Square Park's public art program. His exhibition Liberty/Libertà in the American pavilion featured eight abstract sculptural works exploring themes of slavery and freedom, including a work dedicated to Sally Hemings, the enslaved woman whom American president Thomas Jefferson owned and is alleged to have fathered several children with.

=== 2020–present ===
In 2021, Puryear staged another solo show at Matthew Marks Gallery, exhibiting five sculptures from his Venice exhibition along with one new work, a large bronze basket sculpture that he had previously made in wood in several iterations.

The Museum of Fine Arts, Boston (Note: After closing in Boston, the retrospective traveled to the Cleveland Museum of Art in Ohio, and is scheduled to travel to the High Museum of Art in Atlanta. The show received reviews in The New York Times, The Boston Globe, The Wall Street Journal, The New Yorker, The Washington Post, ARTnews, Sculpture magazine, the Observer, and The Brooklyn Rail.) opened a traveling survey of Puryear's career in 2025 titled Martin Puryear: Nexus, highlighting the variety of materials used in his sculptures.

Also in 2025, Puryear was included in the exhibition Monuments at the Museum of Contemporary Art, Los Angeles exploring the removal of Confederate monuments and memorials. He exhibited an abstract work titled Tabernacle, which was visually similar to hats worn by soldiers in the Civil War.

On April 9, 2026, the Obama Foundation announced that it had commissioned Puryear to create a work for the Obama Presidential Center. Puryear’s work Bending the Arc is a monumental sculpture that pays homage to John Lewis.

== Artwork ==
Vessel (1997–2002), Smithsonian American Art Museum

The artwork of Martin Puryear is a product of visibly complex craft construction and manipulation of pure material; its forms are combinations of the organic and the geometric. His process can be described as reductive, seeking to bring work and material close to its original state and creating rationality in each work derived from the maker and act of making. This is what Puryear calls "inevitability", or a "fullness of being within limits" that defines function.

Often associated with both Minimalism and Formalist sculpture, Puryear rejects that his work is ever non-referential or objective. The pure and direct imagistic forms born from his use of traditional craft are allusive and poetic, as well as deeply personal. Visually, they encounter the history of objects and the history of their making, suggesting public and private narratives including those of the artist, race, ritual, and identity. His work is widely exhibited and collected both in the United States and internationally.

For close to fifty years, Puryear has created works that transpose his distinctive abstract sculptural language to a monumental scale. From his earliest outdoor work at Artpark, in Lewistown, New York, in 1977 to his newly inaugurated 2023 permanent commission for Storm King Art Center, Puryear's public and site-specific sculptures originate with the artist's hand, whether through drawings or with models that the artist carves or fashions from pieces of wood.

=== Lookout (2023) ===
In 2023, Puryear completed Lookout, his first large-scale sculpture made of brick, at Storm King Art Center in New York's Hudson Valley. The artwork is a compound-curved domed shell, pierced by 90 circular apertures of various sizes. Visitors can walk around and into the sculpture, enjoying the views of the surrounding area.

This project had been a structural puzzle until a meeting in 2019 between the artist and MIT professor and structural engineer John Ochsendorf unlocked a solution. Ochesendorf has extensively researched ancient and traditional architectural technologies, particularly masonry vaults and domes. Their meeting resulted in a near-instantaneous collaborative scheme that incorporated the principle of Nubian vaulting, an ancient building method with which Ochsendorf and Puryear were both familiar. Engineering services were provided by Silman Associates, Structural Engineers.

== Notes, citations, and references ==
=== Cited references ===
- Crutchfield, Margo A. (2001). Martin Puryear. Richmond, Virginia: Virginia Museum of Fine Arts. ISBN 9780917046582. OCLC 45618207.
- Field, Jennifer (2007). "Chronology". In Hall, Emily (ed.). Martin Puryear. New York: Museum of Modern Art. pp. 168–200. ISBN 9780870707148. OCLC 154788289.
- Friedman, Julia (2019). "Chronology". In Rapaport, Brooke Kamin (ed.). Martin Puryear: Liberty/Libertà. New York; Berlin: Madison Square Park Conservancy; Gregory R. Miller & Co; Hatje Cantz Verlag. pp. 160–173. ISBN 9781941366240. OCLC 1105595824.
- Liebert, Emily (2025). "Martin Puryear's Joining of Natural and Social Worlds". In Liebert, Emily (ed.). Martin Puryear: Nexus. Cleveland; New Haven, Connecticut: Cleveland Museum of Art; Yale University Press. pp. 126–139. ISBN 9780300283921. OCLC 1542822416.
- Owen, Nancy; Tormollan, Carole (1991). "Chronology". In Benezra, Neal (ed.). Martin Puryear. New York; Chicago: Thames & Hudson; Art Institute of Chicago. pp. 138–139. ISBN 9780500092231. OCLC 23180231.
