= Anna K. E. =

- ანნა კაპანაძე ეძძგვერაძე
- Born: 1986; Tbilisi
- Occupation: Artist

Anna Kapanadze Edzgveradze (born 1986) is a Georgian artist who works under the name Anna K. E.

Anna K. E. was born in 1986 in Tbilisi. She trained as a ballet dancer at the Vakhtang Chabukiani Ballet School.

As a teenager, she moved to Germany with her mother. She studied art at the Staatliche Akademie der Bildenden Künste Stuttgart and the Kunstakademie Düsseldorf.

In 2012, a collection of her artwork was published in a book called A Well-To-do Man Is Cruising in His Fancy Car When a Small Hen Runs Out on the Road in Front.

She represented Georgia at the 58th Venice Biennale in 2019. Her Biennale exhibition REARMIRRORVIEW, Simulation is Simulation, is Simulation, is Simulation… is designed as a public tribunal interspersed with examples of her video work. Water flows through metal sculptures in the shapes of letters in Asomtavruli, phonetically spelling out the English word "deranged".
