= Sun & Sea (Marina) =

2017 opera

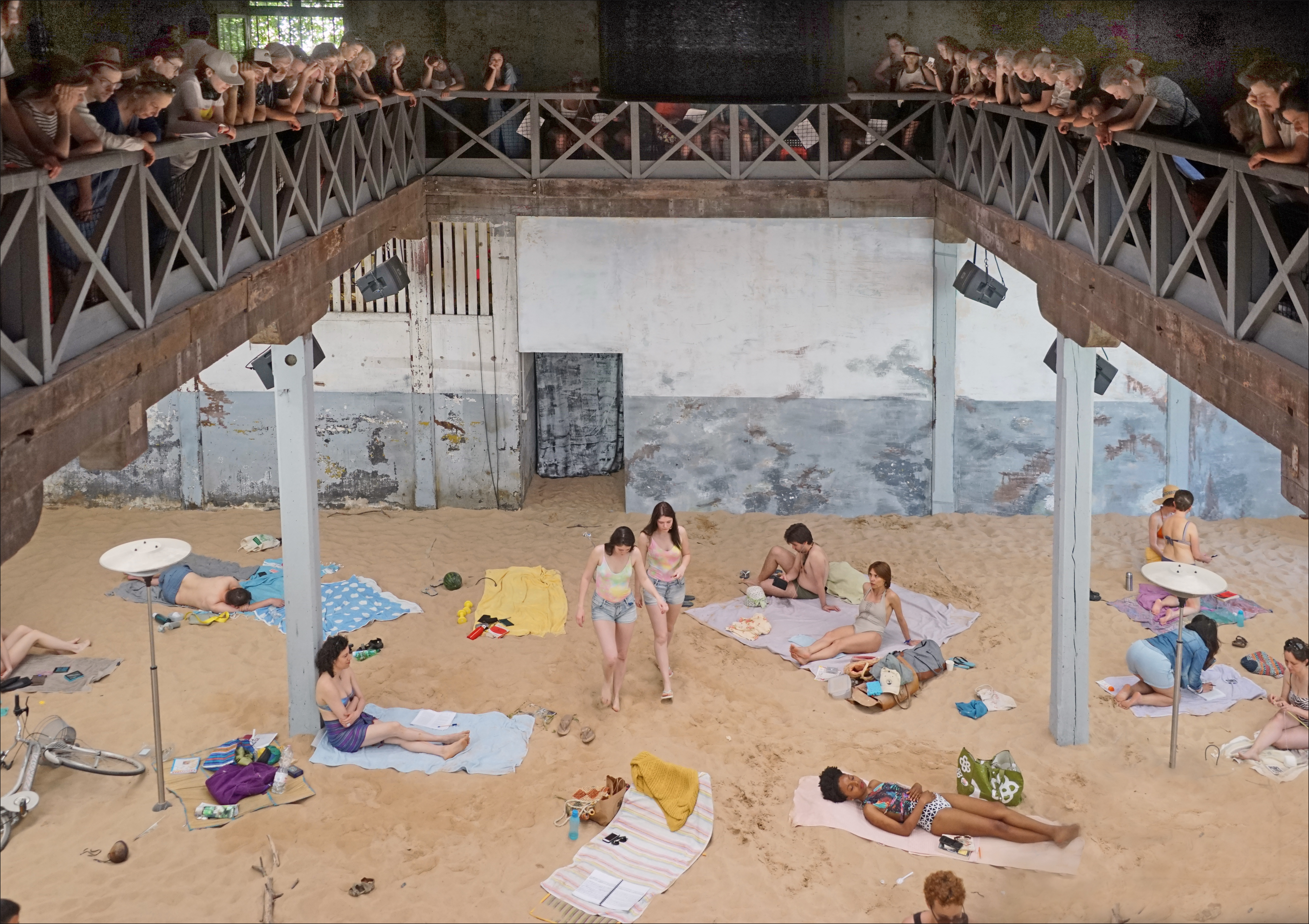

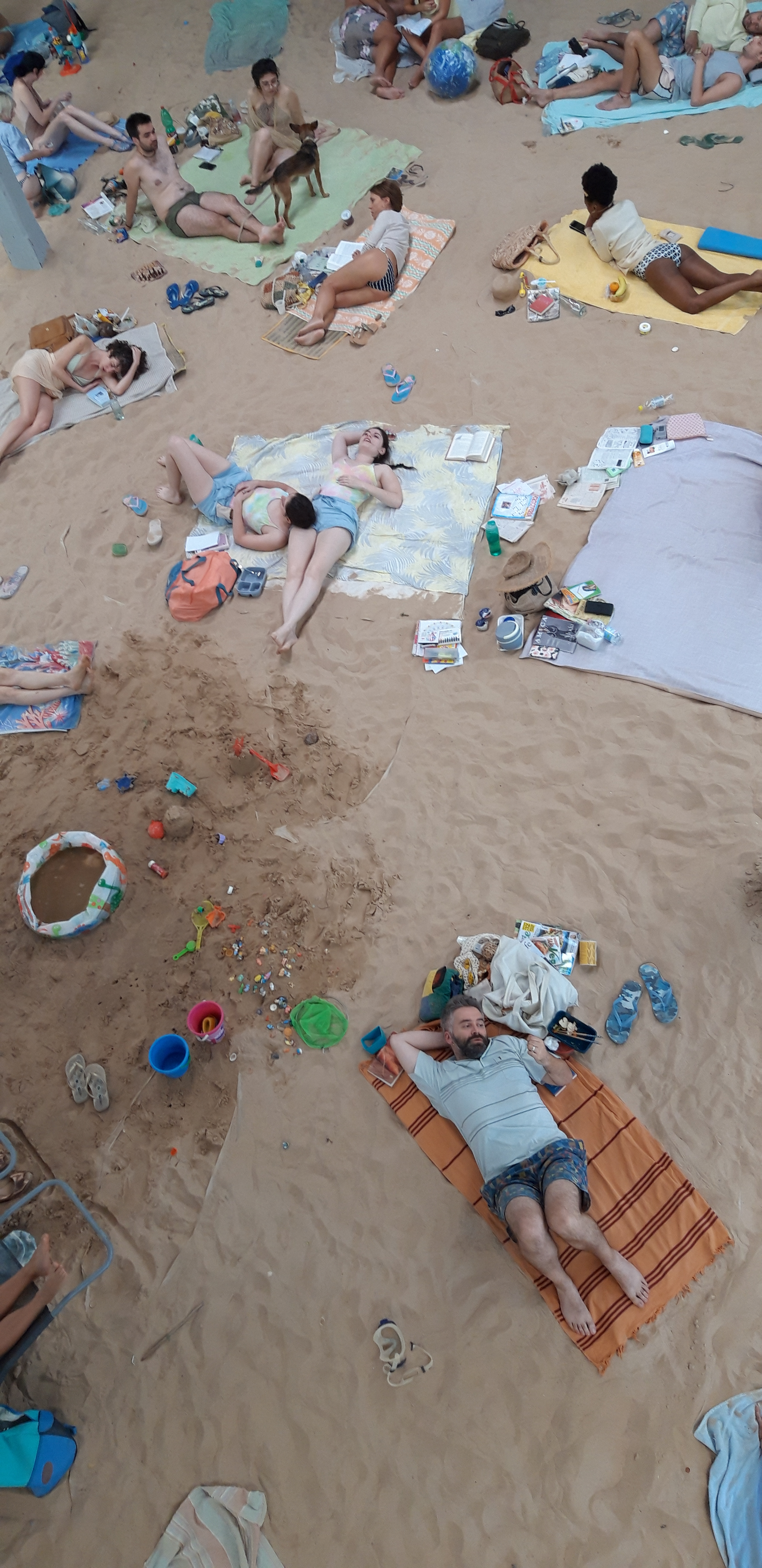

Sun & Sea (Marina) is an opera composed by Lina Lapelytė with a libretto by Vaiva Grainytė and directed by Rugilė Barzdžiukaitė, and presented as part of the 2019 Venice Biennale in a project curated by Lucia Pietroiusti. It won the festival's top award, the Golden Lion. The opera premiered in Lithuanian in 2017 at the Lithuanian National Gallery of Art and was translated into English for the Biennale, where it served as Lithuania's national participation. It is set on a faux beach indoors, in which 24 performers partake in commonplace beach activities while singing about the causes and physical effects of climate change in solo arias and group harmonies. The performance was a popular attraction with long wait lines at the Biennale. Multiple reviewers considered Sun & Sea (Marina) a highlight of the overall exhibition and The Guardian included it among the best performances of the year.

== Description ==
As presented at the 2019 Venice Biennale, the opera is set on an imitation beach indoors. Around 24 performers from Lithuania and Italy walk on the sand, lounge on chairs and towels, and partake in beach and other mundane activities, such as eating salad, checking phones, knitting, and playing frisbee. The actors range in age and family status, reflecting a commonplace beach scene with 30 tons of imported sand.

Though the opera is staged in leisurely harmony, and the performers sing about mundane existence, worry, and boredom, the libretto's contents darkly remark on Earth's deterioration. Their solo arias and group harmonies address the causes and physical effects of climate change and topics including the sun, the tide, ocean pollution, environmental threats, and extreme weather events, such as the whitening of the Great Barrier Reef and Easter-like weather during Christmas.

The audience ascends stairs to a balcony and views the opera from above. The performance runs 60 minutes. In its 2019 Biennale exhibition, the production looped for eight hours of the day.

== Production ==
Sun & Sea (Marina) was created by Rugilė Barzdžiukaitė, Vaiva Grainytė, and Lina Lapelytė. The work was partly inspired by an experience at New York's Guggenheim Museum, in which the artists imagined watching a performance in the atrium from atop the museum's upwardly spiraling ramp.

The opera premiered at the Vilnius National Gallery of Art in 2017. It was rewritten from Lithuanian to English for the Venice Biennale. The production was staged in the Marina Militare, within Venice's Castello area and apart from the main Biennale events in the Giardini and Arsenale. The production immediately faced financial issues, lacking the funds to continue even a weekly performance for the duration of the Biennale after its preview week. The productions costs ran about US$3/minute for eight hours of daily looped performances, eventually leading to reductions in operating hours. A crowdfunding campaign, buoyed by the performance winning the exhibition's top national prize, ensured a weekly performance for the remainder of the six-month Biennale. The show ultimately ran during the Biennale's opening week and on Saturdays thereafter.

The production toured internationally following its Biennale exhibition, including Norway, Switzerland, Germany, and Denmark. Its July 2021 performance, organized by E-Werk Luckenwalde and staged in an abandoned, Bauhaus-style swimming pool complex outside the city, sold out of tickets in 48 hours after being postponed four times. The show's capacity was reduced from 5,000 to 1,500 due to COVID-19 pandemic protocols. The Berlin production cost an estimated US$150,000 with 60 performers and workers. The world tour continued onto Athens in the September Epidaurus Festival and Sweden's Malmö Konsthall in November.

Sun & Sea premiered in the United States in September 2021 at New York's Brooklyn Academy of Music. The production continued to locations across the United States: Philadelphia's Arcadia Exhibitions, Bentonville, Arkansas's The Momentary, and the Los Angeles Museum of Contemporary Art. The production has continued to tour worldwide.

== Reception ==
The Lithuanian pavilion received the Biennale's Golden Lion award for best national participation. Multiple reviewers considered it a highlight of the overall Biennale exhibition. The Guardian named the show as the year's second best and the best surprise of the Biennale. Visitors waited hours in inclement weather to see the popular and "Instagram sensation" performance.

Artsy wrote that the show's universality was underscored by its libretto and commonplace setting and activities. The website praised the piece for its aesthetic beauty and resonant message, that the beaches we associate with freedom and joy can become inhabitable, leaving humanity to artificial alternatives.

Frieze named the work No.15 of "The 25 Best Works of the 21st Century".

Artnet expected the production's 2021 world tour to be even more resonant following the COVID-19 pandemic, a time of international anxiety during which immersive performances were verboten.
