= Siren eun young jung =

South Korean artist (born 1974)

siren eun young jung
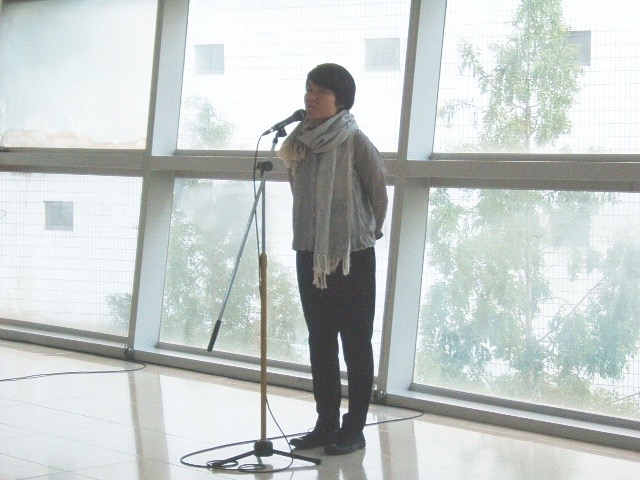
- Jeong Eun-yeong, at the opening ceremony of FANTasia exhibition at Seoul Museum of Art in 2015.
- Born: 정은영; 1974 (age 51–52); Incheon, South Korea
- Occupation: Artist

Korean name
- Hangul: 정은영
- Hanja: 鄭恩瑛
- RR: Jeong Eunyeong
- MR: Chŏng Ŭnyŏng
- Website: http://www.sirenjung.com/

siren eun young jung (Korean: 정은영, born in 1974 in Incheon, South Korea) is a South Korean contemporary artist working in video, performance, installation, and photography. The Seoul-based artist explores issues around gender and sexuality in relation to Korean history, politics, and culture through long-term research projects. Her work is often centered on figures or artistic practices effaced or excluded from conventional archives.

jung's work has been shown in solo exhibitions across Seoul, and she has participated in group exhibitions both in Korea and abroad. jung represented Korea in the 58th Venice Biennale together with artists Hwayeon Nam and Jane Jin Kaisen in the exhibition “History Has Failed Us, but No Matter” curated by Hyunjin Kim. jung has received a number of awards, including the Korea Artist Prize in 2018.

== Education ==
jung was trained as a painter for her BFA and MFA at Ewha Womans University, where she became involved in the feminist movement on campus, and began going by the name “siren eun young jung” in 1994. Part of the impetus for changing her name was her desire to remove the possibility of others determining her gender, ethnicity, and class background based on her name. After graduating with her BFA in 1997 and MFA in 2000 from Ewha, she went on to work with art historian Griselda Pollock for her MA in Feminist Theory and Practice in the Visual Arts at the University of Leeds. She completed her MA in 2004 with a thesis titled "Women Between Nation and Diaspora in the Era of Globalisation." jung then returned to Ewha to write a dissertation titled “The Politics of Gender and the Aesthetics of Dissensus: With a Focus on the Yeoseong Gukgeuk Project,” graduating in 2015 with a Doctorate in Fine Arts. Cho Duckhyun and Kim Hyunjoo supervised jung's dissertation.

== Work ==
Throughout her career, jung has engaged with feminist issues in her artistic practice. Her early work in video, photography, and installation often deals with gendered violence and figures on the social periphery. jung began incorporating performance into her artistic practice with her ongoing series Yeoseong Gukgeuk Project (2008-), which grapples with issues around tradition, queerness, disability, intersectionality, and archival memory and loss. jung describes her methodology as a form of assemblage, and emphasizes the need to push the boundaries of typical art practices. jung has cited a range of scholars as influences on her work, including Judith Butler, Jasbir K. Puar, and Susan Sontag.

=== Dongducheon Project (2007-2009) ===
jung developed her Dongducheon Project (2007-9) centered on the spaces sex workers and undocumented migrants traverse in the camptowns around U.S. military bases. Her examination of the ways in which gendered bodies are interpolated in the complex legacies of Japanese colonization and U.S. militarism has continued in Yeoseong Gukgeuk Project (2008-).

=== Yeoseong Gukgeuk Project 여성국극 프로젝트 (2008-ongoing) ===
Yeoseong Gukgeuk Project is one of jung's most well-known body of works. Yeoseong gukgeuk (Korean or National women's theater) is a traditional form of Korean theater in which women actors play all of the characters. It first emerged in the 1940s partly in response to the gendered exploitation of students by pansori masters. Yeoseong gukgeuk peaked in the 50s and 60s before fading into obscurity in the following decades. The introduction of Western theater and values more broadly in South Korea, as well as lack of institutional support that was predominately directed instead to male performers as a part of Park Chung Hee's efforts to modernize the country, led to yeoseong gukgeuk's decline in popularity.

jung was interested in a similar genre of theater in Japan called takarazuka when she was young, but did not learn about yeoseong gukgeuk until 2008. jung's engagement in the history and practice of yeoseong gukgeuk has yielded a wide array of artworks that document the lives of actors who are still alive, explore the overlap between queerness and performance, consider yeoseong gukgeuk's relationship to contemporary performance as part of a larger queer genealogy, function as an alternative archive, and challenge the parameters of visibility. Her work is a product of over a decade of research, and her direct collaboration with yeoseong gukgeuk actors in creating a visual archive consisting of transcripts, video recordings, and other materials. jung's exploration of the relationship between queerness and performance through the lens of yeoseong gukgeuk is motivated by her interest in the aesthetic qualities of queer performance rather than the queer identities of its performers. She also emphasizes that she is not seeking to revive or recreate the theater tradition through her work, and is instead focusing on the linkages it has to the present age.

==== Act of Affect (2013) ====
This two-part work features nimai actor Nam Eunjin training in yeoseong gukgeuk. For the public performance at Atelier Hermès, Nam shifted between singing and speaking, as well as being onstage and offstage to take on different personas, confess her innermost thoughts and feelings about training in the theater tradition, and question the boundary between what is considered a proper performance in contrast to a rehearsal. The second part of the work is a 15-minute single-channel video showing Nam, in contrast to the public performance that had a full audience, alone on stage and backstage.

==== Anomalous Fantasy (2016-ongoing) ====
This series of performances, with the first and most recent in Korea in 2016 and 2019, then Taiwan (2017), Japan (2018–19), and India (2018), is a 1-hour 25 minute stage performance featuring Nam Eunjin and an amateur gay chorus.

==== Deferral Theatre (2018) ====
Deferral Theatre, a video shown in the 2018 "Artist of the Year" exhibition at the National Museum of Modern and Contemporary Art (MMCA) in Korea, explores the connections between Nam Eunjin, gagok performer Park Minhee, and drag king Azangman. jung states that her juxtaposition of the three figures is meant to emphasize their need for mutual support, the generative possibilities for yeoseong gukgeuk standing outside of the scope of institutional recognition, and how the instability of queerness can allow them to "write our own history by deferring it."

==== A Performing by Flash, Afterimage, Velocity, and Noise (2019) ====
The audio-visual installation A Performing by Flash, Afterimage, Velocity, and Noise was shown in the Korea Pavilion at the 58th Venice Biennale as part of the group exhibition titled "History Has Failed Us, but No Matter." The work is an extension of jung's Yeoseong Gukgeuk Project (2008-). The first part of the installation consisted of three monitors installed at the entrance of the Korean Pavilion showing yeoseong gugeuk actor Lee Deungwoo applying makeup in a theater and performing pansori. The main installation featured a single-channel video projected onto three walls in a 5 x 5 x 4 meter space. The video centers on four performers: actor Yii Lee, Azangman, director of the Disabled Women's Theater Group "Dancing Waist" Seo Jiwon, and electronic musician KIRARA. jung describes the work as an "imaginative genealogy" outside of Western epistemological structures. jung says that the title is a reference to her intentional incorporation and exaggeration of elements typically frowned upon in video art.

== Selected exhibitions ==
=== Solo exhibitions ===
2006 - "The Wandering Diseases," brainfactory, Seoul

2007 - "The Passenger," Traveler's Book project, Seoul

2010 - "Rehearsal," Platform SlowRush, Songdo International city, Incheon

2015 - "Trans-Theatre," Art Space Pool, Seoul

2016 - "Wrong Indexing," Sindoh Art Gallery, Seoul

2016 - "Anomalous Fantasy (Staging)," Season Program, Namsan Art Center, Seoul

2017 - "Wrong Indexing," NTU CCA Singapore, Singapore

2018 - "foolish or mannish," d/p, Seoul

=== Group exhibitions ===
2014 - "Tradition (Un)Realized, Arko Art Center, Seoul

2014 - "Ghosts, Spies, and Grandmothers, SeMA Biennale Mediacity Seoul, Seoul

2014 - 8th Asia Pacific Triennial of Contemporary Art, QAGOMA, Brisbane

2015/2016 - "Discordant Harmony," Hiroshima City Museum of Contemporary Art, Hiroshima

2016 - "The 8th Climate: The 7th Gwangju Biennale," Gwangju

2018 - Taipei Biennial, Taipei

2018 - "Proregress," Shanghai Biennial, Shanghai

2014/2018 - TPAM (Performing Arts Meeting in Yokohama), Yokohama

2018 - "Out of Turn," Serendipity Art Festival, Goa

2018 - "Korea Artist Prize 2018," National Museum of Modern and Contemporary Art (MMCA), Seoul

2019 - "History Has Failed Us, but No Matter," Korea Pavilion, 58th Venice Biennale, Venice

== Awards ==
2013 - Hermès Foundation Missulsang Prize

2015 - Sindoh Art Prize

2018 - Korea Artist Prize
