= Slavery Memorial (Brown University) =

Coordinates: 41°49′36″N 71°24′15″W

- Location: Brown University
- Designer: Martin Puryear
- Weight: 4.5 short tons (4.1 t)
- Dedicated date: 2014

The Slavery Memorial is a sculptural memorial on the campus of Brown University that recognizes the institution's 18th century connections to chattel slavery and the transatlantic slave trade. Designed by sculptor Martin Puryear and dedicated in 2014, the memorial stands on the university's Front Green, adjacent to University Hall.

== Description ==
Constructed of ductile cast iron, the Slavery Memorial depicts a cast-iron ball and chain partially buried underground; the third link of the chain is broken in two.

A granite plaque in front of the memorial reads:

This memorial recognizes Brown University’s connection to the trans-Atlantic slave trade and the work of Africans and African-Americans, enslaved and free, who helped build our university, Rhode Island, and the nation.

In 2003 Brown President Ruth J. Simmons initiated a study of this aspect of the university’s history. In the eighteenth century slavery permeated every aspect of social and economic life in Rhode Island. Rhode Islanders dominated the North American share of the African slave trade, launching over a thousand slaving voyages in the century before the abolition of the trade in 1808, and scores of illegal voyages thereafter.

Brown University was a beneficiary of this trade.

== History ==
In 2003, then-university president Ruth Simmons launched a steering committee to research Brown's 18th century ties to slavery. In October 2006, the committee released a report documenting its findings. The university established a commission in July of the following year to consider how best to fulfill the report's recommendation of creating a "living site of memory." The commission studied a number of existing memorials including the Civil Rights Memorial, African Burial Ground National Monument, and Memorial to the Abolition of Slavery. In 2012, the university's governing body voted unanimously to award Martin Puryear the commission to design a sculptural memorial on Brown's campus.

The university originally considered placing the memorial in the Jewelry District, adjacent to Brown's then-planned medical campus. A university committee ultimately chose to locate the memorial on the Front Green of Brown's main campus given its highly visible location and proximity to University Hall, which was constructed in part by enslaved laborers.

The memorial was installed in the summer of 2014 and dedicated by president Christina Paxson on September 27 of the same year.

== See also ==
- List of Brown University statues
- Memorial to Enslaved Laborers
- Slavery at American colleges and universities
