= Djordje Ozbolt =

Djordje Ozbolt (born 1967 in Belgrade, Serbia) is a London-based Serbian artist who explores ideas of history, memory, and contemporary culture through paintings, sculptures, drawings, and installations. He was chosen to represent Serbia at the 2019 Venice Biennale.

== Early life and education ==
Djordje Ozbolt was born in Belgrade, Serbia, in 1967. He earned a BA from the School of Architecture at the University of Belgrade in 1991. He pursued a BA in Fine Art at the Slade School of Fine Art in London, graduating in 2000, before completing his MA in Painting at the Royal Academy of Arts in London in 2006.

== Exhibitions ==
Ozbolt's work has been exhibited at the Venice Biennale, the Belgrade Biennale, the Hudson Valley Center for Contemporary Art, the National Museum of Art, Osaka, Fondazione Sandretto Re Rebaudengo, Turin, White Columns, New York and The Holburne Museum, Bath.
