= Stuart Scheftel =

American businessman, journalist, golfer (1910–1994)

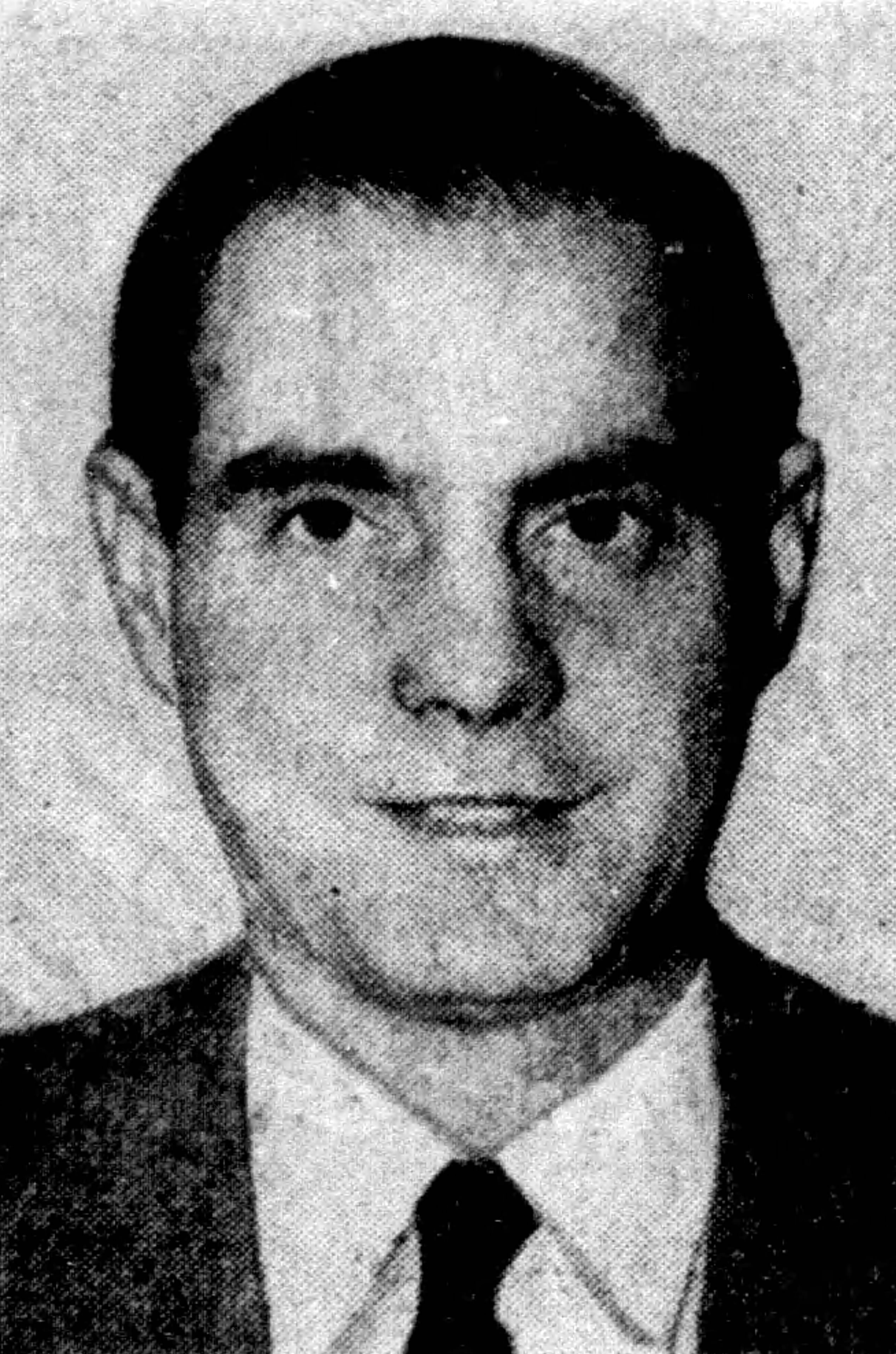
- Scheftel c. 1947
- Born: September 18, 1910
- Died: January 20, 1994 (aged 83); New York City, U.S.
- Resting place: Woodlawn Cemetery in The Bronx, New York, U.S.
- Education: Christ Church College
- Occupations: Businessman; journalist; politician; golfer
- Spouse: Geraldine Fitzgerald (m. 1946)
- Children: 1
- Relatives: Straus family Isidor Straus (grandfather); Jesse I. Straus (uncle); Michael Lindsay-Hogg (stepson)

Stuart Scheftel (September 18, 1910 – January 20, 1994) was an American businessman, journalist, politician, and golfer.

== Early years ==
Born on September 18, 1910, Scheftel was the son of Herbert Scheftel, a partner in J. S. Bache & Co. brokerage house, and Vivian Straus Scheftel. He had no middle name. His grandfather was Isidor Straus, co-founder of R.H. Macy & Company, and Jesse I. Straus, once a U. S. ambassador to France, was his uncle. His father died in 1914, and on July 26, 1917, his mother married George A. Dixon Jr. In accordance with the elder Scheftel's will, her marriage resulted in a transfer of what had been her life interest in his $566,555 estate to Scheftel and his brother, Herbert A. Scheftel Jr.

Scheftel's early education came at St. Bernard's School in New York City and Aiken Preparatory School in South Carolina. Additional education came in Britain and France after his mother's marriage to Dixon, who managed an American bank in Paris. His higher education came at Christ Church College at Oxford. While there, he wrote about golf for publications in Britain.

Michael Lindsay-Hogg is his stepson.

== Journalism ==
Following his graduation from Oxford, Scheftel began working for The New York Times in 1931. He first sold subscriptions and then was an office clerk before he became a reporter. The stories on which he reported included the kidnapping of the Lindbergh baby. He left the newspaper in 1935 to found Young America, a weekly news magazine for use in classrooms, with backing from Marshall Field III.

Also in the late 1930s, Scheftel launched another magazine, Sports Illustrated. It was published monthly with a large-page format like that of Life magazine at the time. It emphasized quality in both written and print journalism and focused more on country-club activities than on professional sports. However, a shortage of paper forced Scheftel to discontinue one of his two publications. He ended the sports magazine in order to focus on Young America. The name Sports Illustrated went unused until 1954, when Scheftel talked with Harry Phillips, the publisher of a new and not-yet-named sports magazine being started by Time Inc. Scheftel offered to sell the Sports Illustrated title "for something in the low five figures" plus a free subscription. Henry Luce, founder of Time Inc., agreed, and the new magazine took on the old title.

From April 18, 1952, until December 19, 1952, Scheftel was host of The Hot Seat, a 30-minute American Broadcasting Company television program on which he and a guest interviewed public figures, including Joseph McCarthy and Tex McCrary.

== Politics and public service ==
In 1942, Scheftel lost as a Republican candidate for the 14th Congressional District in Manhattan. In December 1947, he became chairman of the Draft Eisenhower for President Committee, but he had left the Republican party by the time Eisenhower ran in 1952. As a member of the Liberal Party, he was campaign manager for Rudolph Halley when Halley was elected President of New York's City Council. Scheftel also chaired the Committee at Large advisory group for the Liberal Party.

In 1950, Scheftel was in charge of press relations for the Senate Crime Investigating Committee, with Estes Kefauver at its head. In 1961, he sought to be the Liberal Party's candidate for mayor of New York City, but he withdrew after failing to gather enough signatures on the designating petition. He became vice-chair of the Liberal Party, a position from which he resigned in 1980, protesting the party's endorsement of John B. Anderson for president.

On January 8, 1969, Scheftel became the chairman of the New York City Youth Board, of which he had been a member since 1966. His role in that position included investigating problems related to young people and suggesting programs that might be implemented by the city's Youth Service Agency. That board oversaw the agency, which administered a city-and-federally-funded summer jobs program that involved 40,000-50,000 teenagers who worked 30 hours per week and attended three hours a week of classroom instruction.

During World War II, Scheftel served in the Psychological Warfare Division of the U. S. Army.

== Business ==
Scheftel was a co-founder of the Pan Am Building in New York City, and he was a director of Bullington Realty Corporation, Transcontinental Properties, Inc. and the New York Post.

Scheftel founded and was president of the Museum of Famous People in New York City. Created in 1965 with Scheftel investing more than $500,000, the display occupied a half-acre in the basement of the American Management Association Building at 135 West 50th Street. Approximately 200 tableaux featured figures of about 60 people, including politicians, actors, and athletes. Scheftel compared the figures to those found in wax museums but they were made of vinyl plastic rather than wax. Another difference from wax figures was that the figures contained electric motors that enabled them to move realistically. The museum opened on November 18, 1965.

In 1951, Scheftel acquired the television rights to the "My Most Unforgettable Character" feature of Reader's Digest magazine. He planned to produce a series of 30-minute TV programs using material taken from the 130 sketches that had been published up to that time.

Scheftel and his brother were co-owners of Animal Management Services, which in December 1971 announced plans to build a drive-through exotic game preserve in West Milford, New Jersey. The plans called for a baboon island, a reconstructed African village, a tropical rain forest, and more than 2,000 wild animals and birds. Warner Communications also became a part of the $11.5 million project, which was named Warner Brothers Jungle Habitat. It opened on July 15, 1972, and had 500,000 visitors before three months had passed. The park closed in October 1976 after revenue diminished and Warner ended its participation in the project.

== Sports ==
Scheftel participated in amateur golf tournaments in Europe and the United States, including the 1932 British Open, the 1932 Dixie Amateur Golf Tournament, and the 1939 Maine Open Amateur. As of November 1989, he was the only American who won the British boys golf championship, having done so in 1927. The Scheftel brothers once defeated the future King Edward VIII and American golfer Bobby Jones 6 and 4 in a match. In 1938, Scheftel and professional golfer Leon Pettigrew won a Long Island PGA amateur-pro best-ball tournament in East Williston, Long Island.

== Personal life and death ==
Scheftel wed actress Geraldine Fitzgerald on September 10, 1946, in Los Angeles, and they remained married for 47 years. They had a daughter, Susan, and Scheftel's stepson is Michael Lindsay-Hogg, who directed The Beatles film Let It Be.

He died on January 20, 1994, in New York Hospital, aged 83. Earlier that day he had an apparent heart attack while he and his brother were eating lunch. He is buried beside Fitzgerald in Woodlawn Cemetery, in the Bronx, New York.
