= Brooke Kamin Rapaport =

American art curator

Brooke Kamin Rapaport is an American art curator and writer. She was a Visiting Scholar at the American Academy in Rome in winter 2025. She is the former artistic director and Martin Friedman Chief Curator at Madison Square Park Conservancy in New York City. At Madison Square Park Conservancy, she was responsible for the outdoor public sculpture program of commissioned work by contemporary artists. With an exhibition of Martin Puryear's work, Martin Puryear: Liberty/Libertà, Rapaport served as Commissioner and Curator of the United States Pavilion at the 2019 Venice Biennale. Rapaport frequently speaks on and moderates programs on contemporary art and issues in public art. She also writes for Sculpture magazine where she is a contributing editor. She lives in New York City and is the mother of three sons.

== Education ==
Rapaport was born in Red Bank, New Jersey. She received a Bachelor of Arts, cum laude, from Amherst College and a Master of Arts in Art History from Rutgers University. Rapaport was a Helena Rubinstein Fellow in Museum Studies at the Whitney Museum of American Art Independent Study Program in New York City. She received an honorary degree, Doctor of Arts, from Amherst in 2022.

== Career ==
Rapaport was the assistant curator (1989 to 1993) and associate curator (1993 to 2002) of contemporary art at the Brooklyn Museum in New York City. She organized numerous exhibitions and wrote corresponding catalogues for Vital Forms: American Art and Design in the Atomic Age, 1940–1960 (with Kevin L. Stayton) and Twentieth Century American Sculpture at the White House: Inspired by Rodin (1998, with colleagues). She also realized exhibitions with contemporary artists in the Grand Lobby series of installations including Houston Conwill, Leon Golub, Komar and Melamid, and Meg Webster.

As guest curator at The Jewish Museum in New York City, Rapaport organized The Sculpture of Louise Nevelson: Constructing a Legend, a 2007 survey exhibition that traveled to The Fine Arts Museums of San Francisco, de Young. A catalogue published by Yale University Press accompanied the Nevelson exhibition and was named best Editors' Picks in the Arts and Photography books of 2007 by Amazon.com. The volume also won the New York State Historical Association's Henry Allen Moe Prize for Catalogues of Distinction in the Arts in 2009.

Rapaport organized Houdini: Art and Magic at The Jewish Museum in 2010. The show traveled to venues in Los Angeles, San Francisco, and Madison, Wisconsin. Yale University Press published the exhibition catalogue.

She is a contributing editor and writer for Sculpture magazine and has published articles on artists including contemporary plant artists, Alice Aycock, Christo and Jeanne-Claude, Melvin Edwards, R.M. Fischer, DeWitt Godfrey, Louise Nevelson, John Newman, Judy Pfaff, Shinique Smith, and Ursula von Rydingsvard. Rapaport authored a blog on artists' materials and processes for the International Sculpture Center. Her essay, Why Calder is Back: A Modern Master's Creative Reuse of Materials was included in the exhibition catalogue Alexander Calder and Contemporary Art: Form, Balance, Joy at the Museum of Contemporary Art, Chicago. In 2024, Rapaport joined a group of national curators in "On the Nature of Sculpture Parks," a roundtable discussion for Public Art Dialogue. In March 2025, her article “Roman mural outlining the chain of violence against women will be restored for International Women's Day” was published in The Art Newspaper.

At Madison Square Park Conservancy, Rapaport organized outdoor projects with contemporary artists including Diana Al-Hadid, Tony Cragg, Abigail DeVille, Leonardo Drew, Nicole Eisenman, Teresita Fernández, Hugh Hayden, Paula Hayes, Cristina Iglesias, Maya Lin, Josiah McElheny, Giuseppe Penone, Martin Puryear, Arlene Shechet, Shahzia Sikander, Rose B. Simpson, and Krzysztof Wodiczko. Through Madison Square Park Conservancy in 2017, Rapaport established Public Art Consortium, a national initiative of museum, public art program, and sculpture park curators. In 2024, to mark the twentieth anniversary of the founding of the Conservancy's public art program, she was the editor and lead author for Public Art in Public Space: Twenty Years Advancing Work in New York's Madison Square Park, published by Gregory R. Miller & Company. She also narrated the video documentary launched to celebrate the milestone year.

In August 2018, Madison Square Park Conservancy, along with the U.S. Department of State's Bureau of Educational and Cultural Affairs, announced that Martin Puryear will represent the United States at La Biennale di Venezia 58th International Art Exhibition. The 2019 U.S. Pavilion was commissioned and curated by Rapaport. The exhibition marked the first time in the history of the Biennale that the U.S. Pavilion was organized by an institution whose visual arts program is focused exclusively on public art. An accompanying catalogue, with essays by Rapaport, Darby English, Anne M. Wagner, and Tobi Haslett, was published by Gregory R. Miller & Company.

Rapaport sits on the boards of the Adolph and Esther Gottlieb Foundation, the Al Held Foundation, the von Rydingsvard and Greengard Foundation, and formerly Socrates Sculpture Park and the Mead Art Museum at Amherst College.
