= The Hot Seat (1952 TV show) =

American television talk show

The Hot Seat is a 30-minute American television talk show that was broadcast on ABC beginning on April 18, 1952, and ending on December 29, 1952.

Each episode had host Stuart Scheftel and a guest interviewer posing questions to a celebrity or public figure. Guest interviewers included James Wechsler and Leo Cherne. People interviewed included Ellis Arnall, William Benton, Richard Nixon, Walter Francis White, Joseph McCarthy, Tex McCrary, Helen Gahagan Douglas, and Joseph L. Mankiewicz.

Scheftel was the producer, with Rocky Wall as associate producer, and Robert Doyle was the director. Competing programs included This Is Show Business on NBC and Doc Corkle on CBS.

Newspaper columnist Bob Lanigan noted the program's streamlined approach to interviews, saying that it "makes no pretense at elaborate production, dispenses with all nonessentials and gets down to the business of asking questions immediately."
