= Vaiva Grainytė =

Lithuanian writer, playwright and poet

- Born: Kaunas, Lithuania
- Occupations: Writer, playwright, poet
- Writing career
- Notable awards: 2019 Golden Lion for the best national participation at the 58th Venice Biennale

Vaiva Grainytė is a Lithuanian writer, playwright and poet. She works with interdisciplinary projects.

== Early life and education ==
In 2007 Grainytė graduated from the Lithuanian Academy of Music and Theatre with a BA in Art Theory, and in 2009—with an MA in Theatrology. During the period of 2010–2011 Grainytė studied Chinese language at the Central Academy of Drama (Beijing). From 2015 Grainytė participated in various international residencies, including KulturKontakt residency in Vienna (Austria), Villa Clementine writers residency in Wiesbaden (Germany), Akademie Schloss Solitude residency in Stuttgart (Germany), and Nordic House artist residency in Reykjavík (Iceland).

== Creative work ==
Since 2004 Grainytė is a published author of various essays, reviews and commentaries. Grainytė worked as a writer for the Miesto IQ Magazine (2008–2009), and the Theatre Column Editor for The Economist Magazine (2010–2012). During the period of 2013–2015 she was a senior editor at the Kamane.lt, a professional art news website.

The year 2012 saw a publication of her book Beijing Diaries (Pekino dienoraščiai, Vilnius: Vaga Publishers). Her book of poems Gorilla's Archives (Gorilos archyvai, Vilnius: Lithuanian Writers’ Union Publishing House) was published in 2019.

In her writing, Grainytė uses personal and collective memories, reflections on everyday life, and social themes which she expertly endows with poetic, absurdist and surrealist undertones. Equipped with the gaze of an ironic anthropologist, she brings out processes that often escape our notice, while her reserved skepticism lightly mocks the overly emphasized aspects of social life. In her writings, Grainytė pays a lot of attention to the sentence structure, the topicality, and the paradoxical quality of the imagery she constructs. The writer often erases the boundaries between literary discourse and everyday speech

Grainytė combines individual writing practice with collaborative work. The contemporary operas Have a Good Day!(2013) and Sun & Sea (2017) are among the most notable examples. In her collaborative work Grainytė pays particular attention to the relation between documentality and fiction, the correspondence between realism and poetry, and the interdisciplinary input from theatre, music and visual arts.

== Dramaturgy and stage writing ==
- 2013 Have a Good Day!, a contemporary opera for 10 singing cashiers, supermarket sounds and piano. Co-authors: composer Lina Lapelyt] and theatre and film director Rugilė Barzdžiukaitė. The libretto has been translated into English, French, German, Portuguese, Italian, Russian, Polish, Ukrainian, Latvian, Estonian and Chinese.
- 2016 Lucky Lucy, a show of dance and environmental action. Choreographers and dancers: Agnija Šeiko, Annika Ostwald (Sweden); dramatist: PeO Sanders (Sweden); composer: Magnus Bugge (Norway).
- 2017 Sun & Sea, a contemporary opera; co-producers: Rugilė Barzdžiukaitė and Lina Lapelytė. The project was chosen to represent Lithuania at the 58th Venice Biennale in 2019.
- 2018 Ubu the King (Karalius Ubu), a puppet show-grotesque at the Vilnius Puppet Theatre Lėlė. Director: Neville Tranter; composer: Faustas Latėnas.
- 2018 Cuckoos (Gegutės), a musical performance at the MO Museum, Vilnius. Vo-producer: composer Arturas Bumšteinas.

== Radio plays ==
- 2014 Witches Don't Eat Gummies (Raganos nevalgo guminukų). The play has been included in the Reading Program of the Women Playwrights International (Cape Town, RSA).
- 2015 From the Axis (Nuo Ašies). Director: Saulė Norkutė; sound director and engineer: Vladas Dieninis. The play was awarded a 2nd place at the National Dramaturgy Competition Kviečia radijo teatras (Lithuania).

== Awards ==
In 2012, together with other two co-creators of the opera Have a Good Day!, Grainytė received an award at the Music Theatre NOW, a competition organised by the International Theatre Institute.

The opera Have a Good Day! was shown in a series of international festivals of music, theatre and opera around the world, including Golden Mask (Moscow), Shanghai International Theatre Festival, Prototype Annual Festival of Opera-Theatre and Music-Theatre (New York), as well as Automne En Normandie, NEXT – La Rose Des Vents, Le Bateau Feu, Passages, Horizon, EXIT and Théâtre en Mai festivals in France. The opera was also featured in various theatre festivals in (Germany), Switzerland, Netherlands, Portugal, Italy, Estonia, Latvia, Ukraine. The opera was broadcast on BBC Radio 3 (UK) and LRT (Lithuania).

The works have been co-produced by institutions such as Kammerspiele in Munich and Dresden State Theatre ( (Germany)).

In 2012 Grainytė's book Beijing Diaries was nominated for the Lithuanian Book of the Year category and made it to the list of 12 Most Creative Books. In 2013 the book received The Augustinas Gricius Award.

In 2014 all three co-authors were nominated for the Best Lithuanian Production category and received the Golden Cross of the Stage Award. The same year Grainytė, Lapelytė, and Barzdžiukaitė took part at the Baltic Theatres Festival (Latvia) and received two Competition Programme Awards for the "sensitivity toward the social reality" and "dramaturgy".

In 2015 Grainytė received the Young Artist Award (Lithuania) and the Main Prize at Fast Forward the European Festival for New Directors (Braunschweig, (Germany)).

In 2018, together with Lapelytė and Barzdžiukaitė, Grainytė received the Borisas Dauguvietis Earring Award for the innovative and original approaches.

In 2019, the opera-performance Sun & Sea (Marina) (co-authors: Rugilė Barzdžiukaitė and Lina Lapelytė) won Lithuania the Golden Lion for the best national participation at the 58th Venice Biennale.
