= Susanna Gyulamiryan =

Armenian curator, art critic and feminist scholar

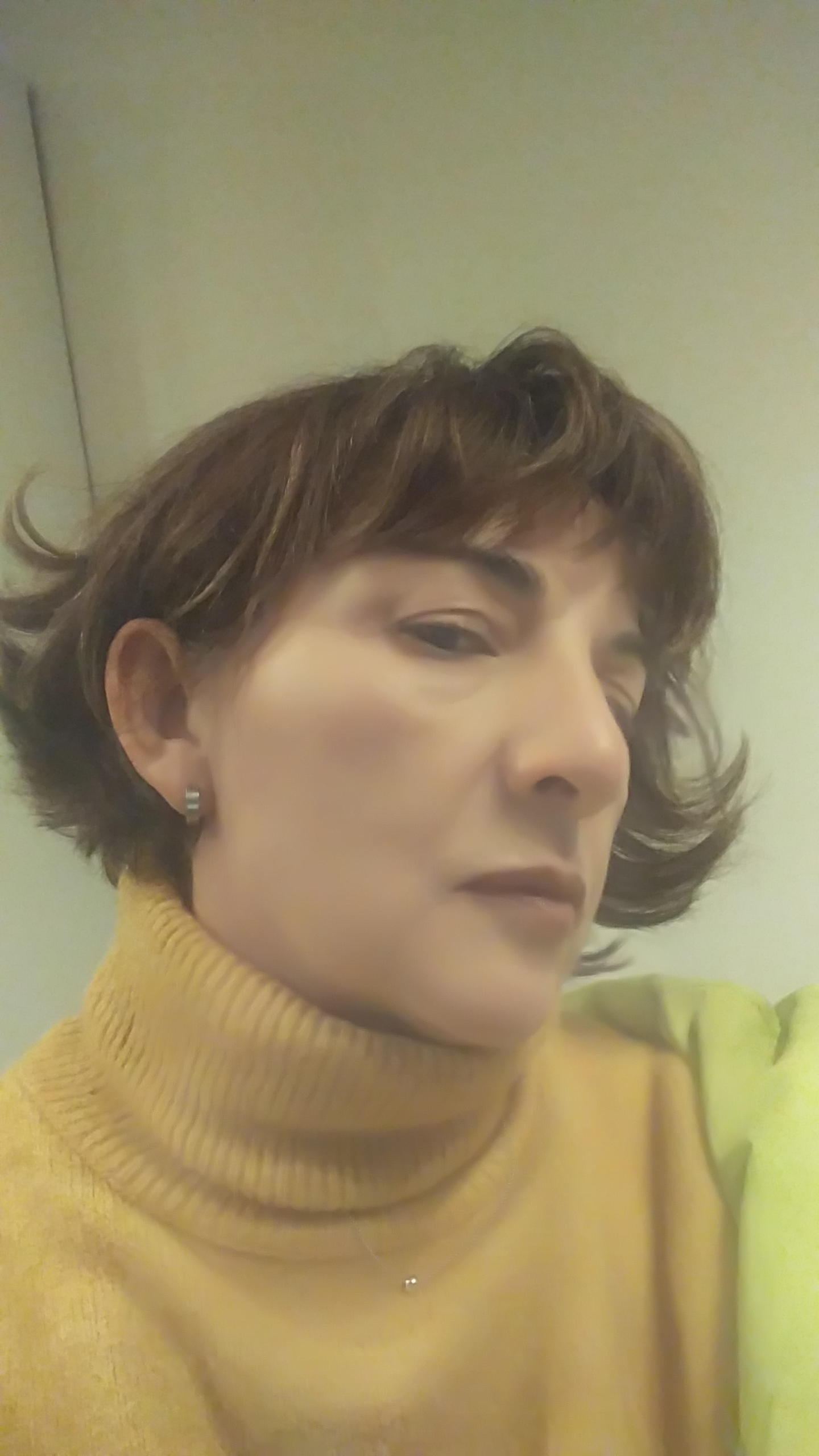
- Born: February 20, 1961 (age 65); Yerevan, Armenia
- Occupations: curator art critic feminist scholar
- Employer(s): "Art and Cultural Studies Laboratory" "Art Commune"; Armenian Open University; Yerevan State University
- Known for: Gender Studies; Feminist Art

Susanna Gyulamiryan (Armenian: Սուսաննա Գյուլամիրյան; born February 20, 1961, in Yerevan, Armenian SSR), Armenian curator, art critic and feminist scholar. She is the appointed curator of the Pavilion of the Republic of Armenia at 58th International Art Exhibition, La Biennale di Venezia (2019). Gyulamiryan is the co-founder and the president of the non-governmental organization "Art and Cultural Studies Laboratory" (ACSL), and artistic director of the "Art Commune" International Artist-in-Residence Program. The "Art Commune" is a general member of the Res Artis worldwide network of artist residencies (resartis.org). Gyulamiryan is a (board) member of AICA-Armenia (International Association of Art Critics). She has led courses in Gender Studies and Feminist Art [Theory and Practice] at the Department of Fine Arts, Armenian Open University (International Academy of Education), and has also carried out MA course in Gender Studies at Yerevan State University, Department of Cultural Studies. She worked as a contributing editor and leader of the monthly columns "The Name of Art" and "Art Situations" at "CinemArt" –the journal on cinematography and contemporary art. The circle of Gyulamiryan's professional interests and studies embraced feminist art, participatory /community art and art of social and political engagement in conjunction with civil and political activism.

== Curtorial projects (selected) ==
- 2024 – "Land(e)scapes. Recognizing Fragmentarity", group exhibition in the framework of the "REVOLUTIONALE – Festival for Change 2024: Challenging Conditions" launched by Peaceful Revolution Foundation, Germany. The exhibition featured artists from Armenia, Belarus, Germany, and Ukraine, Spinnerei, Halle 14 - Center of Contemporary Art, Leipzig, Germany.
- 2023 – "Gender Corpora", Feminist, Queer International Festival #2 (2d Edition). 1. Exhibition I "Human Doors" with artist Rafie Davtian (Iran-Armenia), Yerevan Modern Art Museum. 2. Exhibition II "Gender Corpora", a group exhibition with artists from Armenia, Canada, Germany/Italy, the Netherlands, Yerevan Modern Art Museum. 3. Public Events (public talks) with artists and scholars from Armenia, Iran/UK, and the Netherlands, FemLibrary Armenia.
- 2022 – "Feminism CorpoReal", Feminist, Queer International Festival #1 (1st Edition). - Exhibition I - a group exhibition with artists from Armenia, Canada, Sweden, Goethe-Zentrum Eriwan. - Exhibition II – a group exhibition with artists from Armenia, Cafesjian Center for the Arts (CCA), Yerevan. - Public Events (public talks and workshops) with artists from Armenia, US, Turkey, FemLibrary Armenia.
- 2021 – "Motherland", International Exhibition with artists from the Netherlands, RF/Armenia, Yerevan Modern Art Museum.
- 2019 - "Revolutionary Sensorium," curator of the Pavilion of the Republic of Armenia at 58th International Art Exhibition, La Biennale di Venezia, Venice, Italy
- 2019 - "Dialogues about Revolution and Power: The Voice of Queer Feminist Activists and Scholars in Conjunction with the Feminist Art from Armenia", Wolf & Galentz Gallery, Berlin, Germany
- 2018 - "Gulizar and other Love Stories", solo show of Rebecca Topakian (France), AGBU/ exhibition space, Yerevan, Armenia
- 2018 - "A Passage," Felix Kalmenson and Rouzbeh Akhbari (Canada), Hay Art Cultural Center, Yerevan, Armenia
- 2018 - "On Dismantling the ‘Red’ ", solo show of Lamis Haddadin (Russia/Jordan), Social-Cultural Platform "Commune," Yerevan, Armenia.
- 2017 – 2018 - "Dialogues with Power" (research/exhibition/ publication), "Garage" Museum of Contemporary Art, Moscow, RF.
- 2017 - "Dialogues with Power. Case of Shukhov", in: International Exhibition "Field Research: Liberating Knowledge. Progress Report 2,"Garage Museum of Contemporary Art, Moscow, RF.
- 2017 - "Scratching the Surface," Elizabeth Gerdemann (USA-Germany) and Michael Hahn (Germany), Modern Art Museum, Yerevan, Armenia.
- 2016 - "A Step Behind the Line," solo exhibition of Ariadna Garcia Chas (Spain), Modern Art Museum, Yerevan, Armenia.
- 2015 - "Come Closer. Art from Different Angeles," International group exhibition of artists from Armenia, France, Iran and Switzerland (co-curator: Alina Mnatsakanian (Switzerland), Center of Contemporary Art "Le Manoir de la ville de Martigny," Switzerland.
- 2015 - "Drifting Socially - Slipping Aesthetically," public interventions, performances, graffiti art by artists from Leipzig and Yerevan (co-curators: Kristina Semenova, Olga Vostrezova (Germany), Бuku (Bureau of Cultural Translation), Leipzig Germany & ACSL (Art and Cultural Studies Laboratory).
- 2014 - "Beyond Tinted," solo exhibition of Dickie Webb (UK), Modern Art Museum, Yerevan.
- 2014 - "Triangular projections," Eriz Moreno Aranguren (Spain), Guillermo Manuel
- Rojas (Spain), Nevdon Jamgochian (United States), international group exhibition, Modern Art Museum, Yerevan.
- 2013 - "Taking Position. Identity Questioning," international group exhibition of artists from Armenia and Italy (co-curator: Aria Spinelli (Italy), Frigoriferi Milanesi, Milan, Italy; artistic and curatorial tours and research in Florence, Turin, Venice, Gyumri, Vanadzor, Yerevan, FARE: Cultura Contemporania Applicata, Milan, and ACSL, Yerevan.
- 2013 - "Fragments/ Traces and Gestures," solo exhibition of Taline Zabounian (France), Modern Art Museum, Yerevan.
- 2012 - "Dependency Culture as a State of Mind" (a visual statement to 7th Berlin Art Biennale Call), international group exhibition of artists from Armenia, Germany, Poland and Russia, Interrior DAseign/Colony Wedding, Berlin, Germany.
- 2012 - "Another City or the Other in the City," group exhibition of artists from France and Armenia, Modern Art Museum, Yerevan.
- 2011 - "Art and Power (Imaginative Geographies)," Atlantis 11, group exhibition of artists from Armenia, Georgia, Germany, Bulgaria, Moldova and Slovakia at 54th International Art Exhibition, La Biennale di Venezia (parallel program), Venice, Italy.
- 2007-2011 - "Gender Trouble . Amor Fati?;" "Gender Trouble. Platforms", a series of exhibitions, public talks and screenings by artists from Armenia, Germany, USA, Turkey, Iran, Finland, "Academia" gallery, The Club, Naregatsi Art Institute, Yerevan.
- 2011 - "Possibility of the Angel," curator of the large-scale multimedia installation by Raffie Davtian (Iran - Armenia), 10th Sharjah Biennale of Contemporary Art "Plot for a Biennial" curated by Susan Cotter and Rasha Salti, United Arabic Emirates.
- 2010 - "State Needs," participatory art project by Roger Colombick (USA), Gerolyn Bahm-Colombick (USA) and Vahe Budumyan (Armenia), Yerevan, Armenia.
- 2009 - "Transcaucasian Identification//Territory of Intimacy," solo exhibition of Verena Kyselka (Germany), Modern Art Museum, Yerevan, Armenia.
- 2009 - "Subjects and Objects of History and their Stories," (large-scale installations: "The Menu of Last Supper" and "Human Doors), solo exhibition of Raffie Davtian (Iran-Armenia), "FABRIKA - Center of Creative Industries, Moscow.
- 2008 - "Re-thinking the Past and the Present," Raffie Davtian (Iran-Armenia), Verena Kyselka (Germany), Mkrtich Tonoyan (Armenia), 6th Gyumri Biennale of Contemporary Art "Transformation of History or Parallel Histories, "Armenia.
- 2008 - "Inter-diagnosis", group exhibition of artists from Armenia, Canada, France, Finland, Germany, Norway, Taiwan, Artists Union, Yerevan, Armenia.
- 2008 - "Fragile Safety," public performance of artists Susu Shuling Shih (Taiwan) and Raffie Davtian (Iran-Armenia), Charles Aznavour Square, Yerevan, Armenia.
- 2007 - "Human Doors," solo show of Raffie Davtian (Iran-Armenia), Avant-garde and Folk Music Club, Yerevan, Armenia.
- 2007 - "Pose as Position," solo show of Archie Galents (Germany-Armenia), The Club, Yerevan.
- 2006 - "Map of Wanders, Traces of Confusion," group exhibition of Astghik Melkonyan and Harutyun Zulumyan (Armenia), Center of Contemporary and Experimental Art (ACCEA), Yerevan, Armenia.
- 2005 - "Euroremont," group exhibition of artists from Armenia, ACCEA, Yerevan.
- 2005 - "Re-turn," retrospective show of Hamlet (Ashnaktsi) Hovsepyan, ACCEA, Yerevan.
- 1994 "The Ark’s Question (Moscow conceptualism and newly formed Armenian contemporary art)," group exhibition, Modern Art Museum, Yerevan, Armenia.

== Other professional activities (selected) ==
- 2022 – Speaker of the session "Radical Thinking/Paradigm Shifts, Moving Beyond Outmoded Cultural Practices" (late afternoon session, November 4) within the International Conference on "Opportunities in the Arts: Create the Future", organized by TransCultural Exchange at the Colleges of the Fenway in Boston, Massachusetts, with attendant activities and events throughout the city of Boston and its neighboring city Cambridge such as the Massachusetts College of Art and Design, Boston's Museum of Fine Arts, Institute of Contemporary Art, Isabella Stewart Gardner Museum, MIT's List Visual Arts Center, MCPHS University, Wentworth Institute of Technology. November 4–6. 1920 – "I’ve Never Seen the Sky Like This Before", audio-textual participation in the International Group Show, Southwest Contemporary – SW Gallery, Australia. 1920 – "The End of the Grand Tour? Acknowledging the Fault Line of Cultural Exchanges: In the Search for Reciprocity Beyond Geography", International Virtual Symposium. Panelists: Susanna Gyulamiryan - Art and Cultural Studies Laboratory (ACL - Armenia), Francisco Guevara - Arquetopia Foundation (Mexico, Peru, Italy), John LUI - In-Situ (Hong Kong).
- 2018 - "Liberation or (Un)hidden Discrimination. Soviet-Armenian Women’s Art," speaker at tree days conference "Soviet Concept," Yerevan State University, Department of History.
- 2018 -"Dichotomy of the Local and Global," speaker of the round the table devoted to the topic "Shifting Perspectives on Art from Local to Global. How can a local artistic practice remain authentic in places of trade and commodity," Art Fair Armenia 2018, YerevanЕxpo.
- 2012 – 2017 - "Women’s Art versus Feminist Art. Categories and Contradictions in Soviet-Armenian and Contemporary Art Practices," a series of lectures and public talks in "Feminist Agency (Intersections of Activism, Archiving, Art History, Critical Research, Curating, Feminisms and Politics of Remembrance), < rotor > association of contemporary art, Graz, Austria; Arsenal gallery Bialystock, Poland; Fem ++; Women’s Resource Center, and Henrich Boell Foundation-South Caucasus "Green Academy: Politicizing Our Experience," Yerevan, Armenia.
- 2015 – Public talk at "Feminism and Gender Democracy," Henrich Boell Foundation- South Caucasus, Yerevan.
- 2013 – 2014 "Functions and Functionality of Participatory Art," a series of lectures, BUKU (Bureau of Cultural Translations) Leipzig, Germany; GeoAIR Tbilisi, Georgia.
- 2014 - "Escape and Engagement. Residencies as Hosts, Producers and Promoters," Res Artis Regional Meeting, Vilnius Academy of Arts and Nida Art Colony, Lithuania.
- 2011 – 2012 - "Dimensions of Cultural Identity and post-Soviet ways of Modernization in Armenia", initiator and moderator of a series of seminars by cultural critic Hrach
- Bayadyan, in HEICO international networking program - European Commission, Kalents Museum, Yerevan, Armenia.
- 2011 - "From Search to Metanoja," public talk in City in Use, Suburb Cultural Center, Mekhitar Sebastatsi Educational Complex, Yerevan, Armenia.
- 2011 - "Inventing Transcaucasia," public talk in Fluid Ground international workshops on a cargo ship through the Black Sea, art institutions from Armenia (ACSL), Bulgaria (ATA), Georgia (GeoAIR), Germany (Rokinstbau and Henrich Boel – Brandenburg), Moldova (K:SAK), Slovakia (SPACE), HEICO international networking program - European Commission, Istanbul - Varna - Batumi -Tbilisi.
- 2011- "Feminist Strategies in Art. Politics of Representation," public lecture at "Journey to the East," Gallery "Arsenal," Bialystok, Poland.
- 2009 - "Re-tooling Residencies," Eastern European Res Artis Meeting, Center for Contemporary Art "Ujazdowski Castle", Warsaw, Poland.
- 2009 - Res Artis Residency Symposium, Townhouse Gallery, Cairo, Egypt.
- 2008 - "Artists in Dialogues. Transforming Communities," Res Artis General Meeting, Amsterdam, Netherlands.
- 2007 - "Gender Studies as a Tool for Advanced Education," speaker at the international conference "Intercultural Dialogues at the Crossroad of Millennium", Armenia Marriott, Yerevan.
- 2007 - "Tradition and Representation. Women’s images in Soviet - Armenian
- Cinematography," a series of public lectures and screenings, Civil Society Network -
- Inter-community, Haghartsin, Dilijan, Armenia.
- 2007 - "South Caucasus Cultural Space: The Past and the Present," speaker at the international meeting on "Literary Journal for Regional Peace," Gudauri, Georgia.
- 2007 - "Contemporary Institution as Producers in Late Capitalism," CIMAM Annual Conference, Generali Foundation, Vienna, Austria.
- 2005 - "Matters of Ethics. Affording Criticism," initiator and moderator of a conference, Small Theater- National Center of Aesthetics, Yerevan.
- 2006 - "Why Have There Been No Great Women Film Directors or Artists. In the footsteps of Linda Nochlin," public talk at KIN (Woman) International Film Festival, Yerevan.
- 2006 - "About feminist art and socially, politically engaged art," seminar at the Institute of Human Rights and Democracy (IHRD), Yerevan.

== Publications ==
- "Land(e)scapes. Recognizing Fragmentarity, Impressum/Imprint, Germany, ed. Michael Arzt, publisher: Halle 14 e.V Leipzig, 2025
- "Gender Corpora", Feminist, Queer International Festival, ed. Susanna Gyulamiryan, "Antenor" Printing House, Armenia, 2024
- "Feminism CorpoReal", Feminist, Queer International Festival, ed. Susanna Gyulamiryan, "Antenor" Printing House, Armenia, 2023
- "Revolutionary Sensorium", National Pavilion of the Republic of Armenia, 58th International Art Exhibition, La Biennale di Venezia (Catalogue), ed. Susanna Gyulamiryan ©, "Antenor" Printing House, Armenia, 2019
- "Dialogues with Power", ed. Susanna Gyulamiryan, Garage Museum of Contemporary Art, "Antenor" Printing House, 2018
- "Women’s Art versus Feminist Art. Categories and Contradictions in Soviet-Armenian and Contemporary Art Practicies of Armenia", in Women's Manifestations in Armenia at 19th to 21st centuries, ed. G. Shahnazaryan, Zartprint, Yerevan, 2015.
- "Women’s Art versus Feminist Art. Categories and Contradictions in Contemporary Art Practices of Armenia," in Women's Museum.Curatorial Politics in Feminism, Education, History and Art, eds. Elke Krasny and Women's Museum Meran, Loker Verlag, Austria, 2013.
- "Seeing the Un-seeable. Ontological Walkscapes," in Entry Points, The Vera List Center for Art and Politics, Field Guide-Book on Art and Social Justice No.1, New School, NY, USA, 2014.
- "(Im)Possible Communities", in Taking Position Identity Questioning, ed. FARE Cultura Contemporania Applicata, Milan, Italy, 2014.
- "Possibility of the Angel: Thoughts Provoking Art," in Plot for a Biennial, Catalog of the 10th Sharjah Biennial of Contemporary Art, eds. Susan Cotter and Rasha Salti, Sharjah Art Foundation, Unated Arabic Emirates, 2011.
- "All Others," catalo of the art project Human Doors, eds. Susanna Gyulamiryan and Raffie Davtian, ACSL, Yerevan, 2007.
- "Re-turn," in Time of Storytellers. Narrative and Distant Gaze on the Post- Soviet Art, eds. Victor Misiano and Jari-Pekka Vanhala, Museum of Contemporary Art KIAZMA, Helsinki, Finland. 2008.
- "Caucasian Roof", in L’invironement du Corps, eds. A.Barseghyan, N. Karoyan, S. Kristensen, Metis Press, Geneva, Switzerland, 2009.
- 2004 – 2009 Numerous articles, reviews, texts and TV documentaries in journals Actual Art, CinemArt, Afisha, Radio and TV Broadcasting of Armenia/ Department of International Relations, TV program Pshalar (Barbed Wire) and other medias.
