= Young America (magazine) =

Magazine published for American schoolchildren

Young America was a magazine published for American schoolchildren. It was founded by Stuart Scheftel, with backing by Marshall Field III, after Scheftel left The New York Times in 1935,

Young America (YA) was sold to students in elementary and junior high schools. Each issue was a 12-page tabloid "with plenty of pictures, cartoons, maps, [and] charts. An 18-week subscription cost 25 cents. By September 1940, YA had the fourth-highest circulation for an American publication for children. Its 296,000 circulation trailed American Boy-Youth's Companion, Boys' Life, and Open Road for Boys.

In October 1945, Scheftel announced expansion of the Young America franchise with the formation of Young America Films Inc. (YAF). Scheftel became the film company's president, and Alfred Gwynne Vanderbilt Jr. became the chairman of its board. Plans called for production and distribution of documentary and short-subject films and distribution of related equipment, including projectors and screens (the 16-millimeter projectors to be made by National Mineral Company). YAF would also distribute educational films made by other producers. A month later, Scheftel announced that YAF would also provide educational 35-millimeter filmstrips and slides with accompanying lesson plans and manuals for teachers, working through existing school-supply distributors in all 48 states, Alaska, and Hawaii. Films sold for $25 each.

During World War II, the Young America umbrella expanded further with the formation of Young America Victory Clubs by Scheftel. They encouraged schoolchildren to donate pennies, nickels, and dimes to the war effort. One two-day campaign resulted in $6,000, which was enough to purchase three ambulances for the Allied effort. By April 1942, the clubs were in about 5,000 American schools with membership of approximately 88,000 students.
