= Liberty/Libertà =

Art exhibition at the 2019 Venice Biennale's American pavilion

Martin Puryear: Liberty/Libertà is an art exhibition at the 2019 Venice Biennale's American pavilion featuring new works by sculptor Martin Puryear and curated by Brooke Kamin Rapaport. The Biennale is an international contemporary art biennial in which countries organize their own representation through national pavilions. Multiple journalists named the American pavilion an overall highlight of the Biennale.

== Background ==
The Venice Biennale is an international art biennial exhibition held in Venice, Italy. Often described as "the Olympics of the art world", participation in the Biennale is a prestigious event for contemporary artists. The festival has become a constellation of shows: a central exhibition curated by that year's artistic director, national pavilions hosted by individual nations, and independent exhibitions throughout Venice. The Biennale parent organization also hosts regular festivals in other arts: architecture, dance, film, music, and theater.

Outside of the central, international exhibition, individual nations produce their own shows, known as pavilions, as their national representation. Nations that own their pavilion buildings, such as the 30 housed on the Giardini, are responsible for their own upkeep and construction costs as well. Nations without dedicated buildings create pavilions in venues throughout the city.

== Description ==
The exhibition consists of eight wood sculptures. Big Phrygian, a large, red, cedar version of the French revolutionary cap, invokes a prior theme for which he was already known. In the opposite room, Tabernacle evokes an American Civil War-era soldier's hat, with a patterned fabric interior. And New Voortrekker is a wagon made of ash, cypress, and maple, evoking escape.

Outside the pavilion, Puryear built a wooden lattice façade to enclose the building, Swallowed Sun (Monstrance and Volute). This symbolic cage was meant to show the dissonance of exhibiting in a building modeled after the neoclassical Monticello plantation estate of the slaveholding American figure Thomas Jefferson, letting visitors "peer through the barrier ... into the historical past". The lattice, like an upside-down basket, connects into snakelike black tube, inspired by an adornment on a Greek column. The work's title refers to the despairing total eclipse when values are unstable.

Another new work inside also responds to Jefferson: A Column for Sally Hemings. The sculpture in the rotunda—an iron shackle mounted into an immaculate, white column—is named for a slave who worked and bore children for Jefferson.

== Production ==
The Puryear exhibition marked the first time the American pavilion was organized by a public art institution. Its commissioner, Brooke Kamin Rapaport, is a curator and director of the Madison Square Park Conservancy.

== Reception ==
Multiple journalists named the American pavilion an overall highlight of the Biennale.

Artsy wrote that the lattice façade guarding the pavilion was bold even before entering the exhibition. The Financial Times suggested that it be permanently installed.
