= Korean pavilion =

South Korean presence at the Venice Biennale

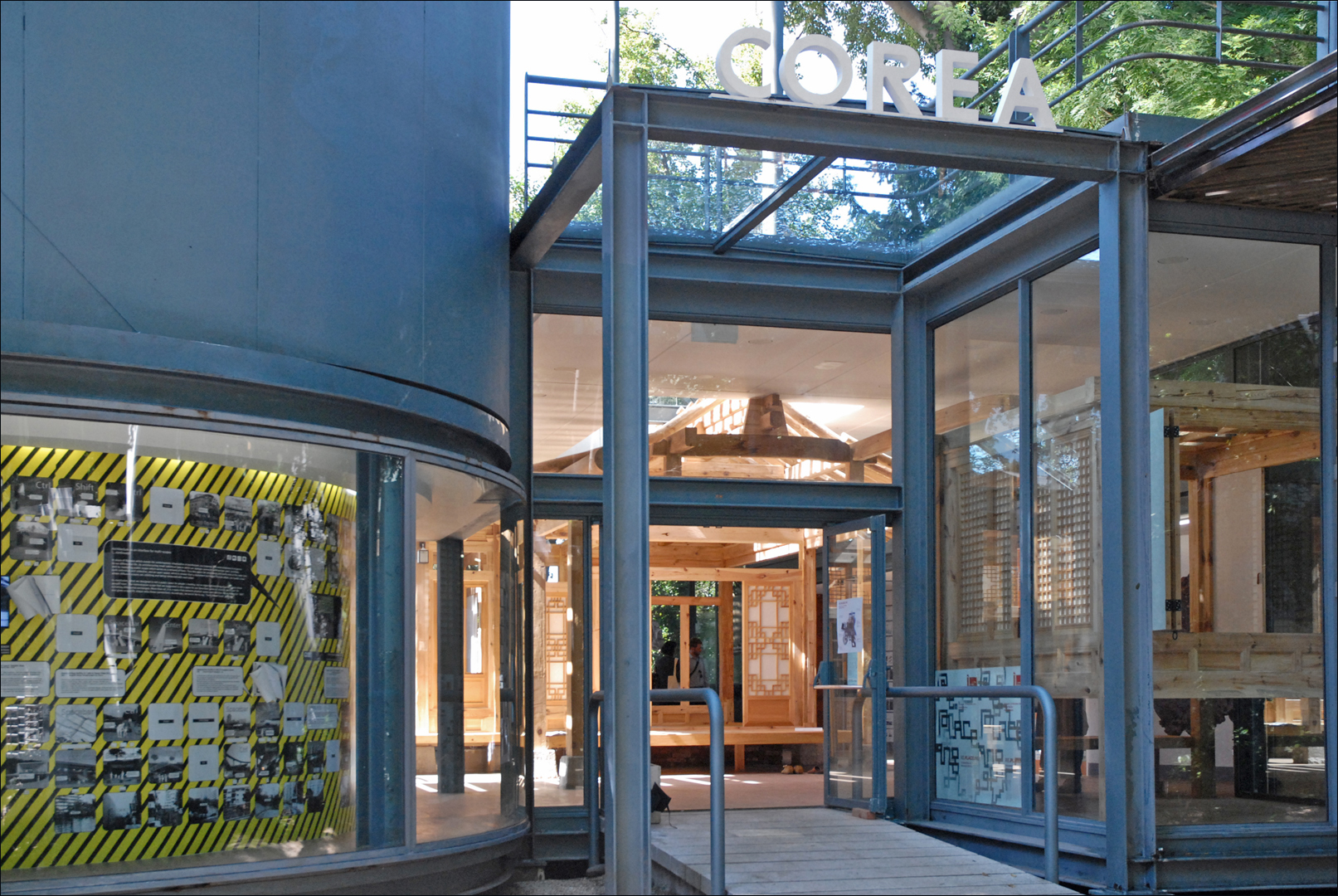
The Korean pavilion

The Korean pavilion houses South Korea's national representation during the Venice Biennale arts festivals.

== Background ==
The Venice Biennale is an international art biennial exhibition held in Venice, Italy. Often described as "the Olympics of the art world", participation in the Biennale is a prestigious event for contemporary artists. The festival has become a constellation of shows: a central exhibition curated by that year's artistic director, national pavilions hosted by individual nations, and independent exhibitions held throughout Venice. The Biennale's parent organisation also runs regular festivals in other arts: architecture, dance, film, music and theatre.

Outside the central international exhibition, individual nations produce their own shows, known as pavilions, as their national representation. Nations that own their pavilion buildings – such as the 30 housed in the Giardini – are responsible for their own upkeep and construction costs as well. Nations without dedicated buildings create pavilions in venues throughout the city.

== Organization and building ==
The Korean Pavilion, designed by Seok Chul Kim and Franco Mancuso, was built between 1994 and 1995.

South Korea has participated in the Venice Biennale since 1995.

== Representation by year ==
=== Art ===
- 1995 — Yoon Hyong Keun, Kwak Hoon, Kim In Kyum, Jheon Soocheon (Commissioner: Il Lee)
- 1997 — Hyungwoo Lee, Ik-joong Kang (Curator: Oh Kwang Soo)
- 1999 — Lee Bul, Noh Sang-Kyoon (Curator: Misook Song)
- 2001 — Michael Joo, Do-Ho Suh (Commissioner: Kyung-mee Park)
- 2003 — Whang In Kie, Bahc Yiso, Chung Seoyoung (Commissioner: Kim Hong-Hee)
- 2007 — Hyungkoo Lee (Commissioner: Soyeon Ahn)
- 2009 — Haegue Yang (Commissioner: Eungie Joo)
- 2011 — Lee Yong-baek (Commissioner: Yun Chea-gab)
- 2013 — Kimsooja (Curator: Kim Seung-duk)
- 2015 — Moon Kyungwon, Jeon Joonho (Curator: Sook-Kyung Lee)
- 2017 — Cody Choi, Lee Wan (Curator: Lee Daehyung)
- 2019 – Hwayeon Nam, Siren Eun Young Jung, Jane Jin Kaisen (Curator: Hyunjin Kim)
- 2024 – Koo Jeong A (Curators: Jacob Fabricius, Seolhui Lee)

== Bibliography ==
- Lee, Sohl (Fall 2015). "Virtual Space and National Division: Crow's Eye View: The Korean Peninsula at the Venice Architecture Biennale (2014)". Journal of Korean Studies. 20 (2): 291–332. doi:10.1353/jks.2015.0018. ISSN 0731-1613.
- Russeth, Andrew (April 17, 2019). "The Venice Biennale: Everything You Could Ever Want to Know". ARTnews.
- Volpi, Cristiana (2013). "South Korea". In Re Rebaudengo, Adele (ed.). Pavilions and Garden of Venice Biennale. Rome: Contrasto. p. 194. ISBN 978-88-6965-440-4.
