= 58th Venice Biennale =

2019 international contemporary art exhibition

- Genre: Art exhibition
- Begins: May 11, 2019
- Ends: November 24, 2019
- Location: Venice
- Country: Italy
- Previous event: 57th Venice Biennale (2017)
- Next event: 59th Venice Biennale (2022)

The 58th Venice Biennale was an international contemporary art exhibition held between May and November 2019. The Venice Biennale takes place biennially in Venice, Italy. Artistic director Ralph Rugoff curated its central exhibition, May You Live in Interesting Times, and 90 countries contributed national pavilions.

== Background ==
The Venice Biennale is an international art biennial exhibition held in Venice, Italy. Often described as "the Olympics of the art world", participation in the Biennale is a prestigious event for contemporary artists. The festival has become a constellation of shows: a central exhibition curated by that year's artistic director, national pavilions hosted by individual nations, and independent exhibitions throughout Venice. The Biennale parent organization also hosts regular festivals in other arts: architecture, dance, film, music, and theater.

Outside of the central, international exhibition, individual nations produce their own shows, known as pavilions, as their national representation. Nations that own their pavilion buildings, such as the 30 housed on the Giardini, are responsible for their own upkeep and construction costs as well. Nations without dedicated buildings create pavilions in the Venice Arsenale and palazzos throughout the city.

The 58th Biennale was open between May 11 and November 24, 2019, immediately preceded by three press preview days.

== Central exhibition ==
Ralph Rugoff, a former journalist and now director of the London Hayward Gallery, served as the 58th Biennale's artistic director. His main exhibition's theme is "May You Live in Interesting Times", which refers to an apocryphal curse attributed to ancient China but likely of Western origin. The theme, which Rugoff considered interesting for its ambiguity, intends to reflect how misreadings and fake news have lasting impact on reality. He suggested that art can guide where it cannot directly affect the rise of authoritarian governments or migrant crisis. While recent biennials have addressed social issues, Rugoff wanted his exhibition to focus on art's ability to provide alternate realities and question habits of thought. Rugoff had previously organized a talk series on the subject of "alternative facts" at the 2017 London Frieze art fair.

The artistic director selected 79 artists and groups for the central exhibition. Rugoff continued to work at the Hayward Gallery while he prepared the show over 18 months with a €13 million budget.

Figurative painting and kinetic sculpture are prominent in the exhibition. A large George Condo canvas opens the Arsenale amid other figurative paintings of real and imaginary people by Njideka Akunyili Crosby, Nicole Eisenman, and Henry Taylor. Avery Singer's computer-airbrushed wood panels of computer-generated imagery were particularly compelling. One room of the central pavilion was cacophonous, with a slamming security gate by Shilpa Gupta and a cow on a circular railroad by Nabuqi. Multiple holograms are in the show. Artworks by Martine Gutierrez were also featured in the Central Pavilion.

== National pavilions ==
The 90 national pavilions of the 58th Biennale exhibition was a new record for national participation, exceeding the 86 from 2017. Each country selects artists to show at their pavilion, ostensibly with an eye to the Biennale's theme.

Highlight pavilions from the show included Lithuania's Sun & Sea (Marina), Ghana's Ghana Freedom, France, the United States' Liberty/Libertà, the Philippines, India, Brazil, Poland, and Italy.

The American and British pavilions were unusually inconspicuous in presenting the minimalist works of Martin Puryear and Cathy Wilkes. Belgium and Russia both hosted elaborate kinetic sculptures. The Canadian pavilion exhibited Zacharias Kunuk's film One Day in the Life of Noah Piugattuk.

First-time presenters at the Biennale included Ghana, Madagascar, Malaysia, and Pakistan. Algeria had planned its first pavilion but canceled its funding after the country's president resigned. The selected artists fundraised and presented the pavilion unofficially.

== Collateral events ==
The Kenneth Goldsmith exhibition HILLARY: The Hillary Clinton Emails, curated by Francesco Urbano Ragazzi, was shown at Despar Teatro Italia, a cinema converted into a supermarket. On September 10, 2019, Hillary Clinton visited the exhibition and said that the attention given to her emails was one of the "strangest" and most "absurd" events in U.S. political history, adding, "Anyone can go in and look at them. There is nothing there. There is nothing that should have been so controversial."

Other shows in Venice that coincided with the Biennale included designer Virgil Abloh's metal furniture at Carpenters Workshop Gallery.

== Awards ==
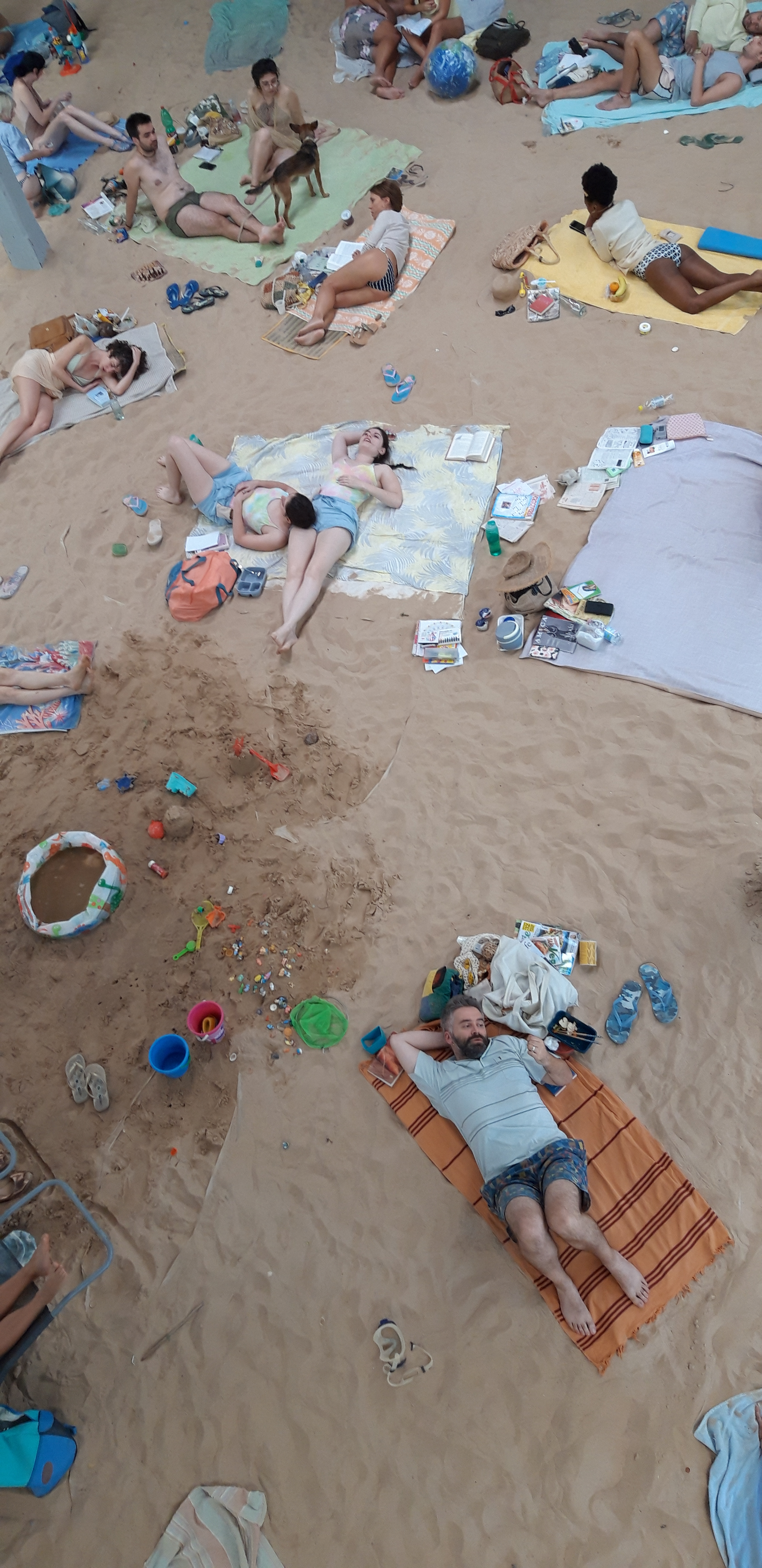
Sun & Sea (Marina), recipient of Golden Lion for best national participation

An international jury presented the three main prizes following the Biennale's opening ceremonies:

- Golden Lion for best national participation: Lithuanian pavilion
- Golden Lion for best artist of the central exhibition: Arthur Jafa
- Silver Lion for the most promising young artist of the exhibition: Haris Epaminonda

The jury additionally had the option to present special mentions for a national pavilion and two artists in the central exhibition.

The 58th Biennale's Golden Lion for lifetime achievement went to Jimmie Durham. This nominee was proposed by the artistic director (Rugoff) and confirmed by the Biennale's board prior to the opening.

== Reception ==
Stylistic themes across the 58th Biennale included figurative painting, immersive video installation—including a virtual reality work by Dominique Gonzalez-Foerster—and kinetic sculpture. There were also several art duos in exhibition.

Over 600,000 visitors attended. In light of the climate crisis and iconic, severe flooding in Venice in the Biennale's last days, Artnet asked whether future Biennales should better advocate for sustainability.
