= American pavilion =

Venice Biennale national pavilion

The American pavilion in 2020

The American pavilion is a national pavilion of the Venice Biennale. It houses the United States' official representation during the Biennale.

== Background ==
The Venice Biennale is an international art biennial exhibition held in Venice, Italy. Often described as "the Olympics of the art world", participation in the Biennale is a prestigious event for contemporary artists. The festival has become a constellation of shows: a central exhibition curated by that year's artistic director, national pavilions hosted by individual nations, and independent exhibitions held throughout Venice. The Biennale's parent organisation also runs regular festivals in other arts: architecture, dance, film, music and theatre.

Outside the central international exhibition, individual nations produce their own shows, known as pavilions, as their national representation. Nations that own their pavilion buildings – such as the 30 housed in the Giardini – are responsible for their own upkeep and construction costs as well. Nations without dedicated buildings create pavilions in venues throughout the city.

== Organization and building ==
The American pavilion was the ninth to be built on the Giardini, but unlike other pavilions, which are built by governments, the American pavilion is privately owned. The three-room Palladian building was constructed in 1930, for the New York Grand Central Art Galleries. Ownership transferred to the Museum of Modern Art in 1954 and to the Guggenheim Foundation in 1986.

For the United States' national representation, a committee of experts select from proposals written by institutions. The Advisory Committee on International Exhibitions is assembled by the National Endowment for the Arts and Department of State. The months-long process involves an application nearly 100 pages in length and a final embargo before announcement.

== History ==
The United States Pavilion at the Venice Biennale was constructed in 1930 by the Grand Central Art Galleries, a nonprofit artists' cooperative established in 1922 by Walter Leighton Clark together with John Singer Sargent, Edmund Greacen, and others. As stated in the Galleries' 1934 catalog, the organization's goal was to "give a broader field to American art; to exhibit in a larger way to a more numerous audience, not in New York alone but throughout the country, thus displaying to the world the inherent value which our art undoubtedly possesses."

In 1930, Walter Leighton Clark and the Grand Central Art Galleries spearheaded the creation of the U.S. Pavilion at the Venice Biennale. The pavilion's architects were William Adams Delano, who also designed the Grand Central Art Galleries, and Chester Holmes Aldrich. The purchase of the land, design, and construction was paid for by the galleries and personally supervised by Clark. As he wrote in the 1934 catalog:

"Pursuing our purpose of putting American art prominently before the world, the directors a few years ago appropriated the sum of $25,000 for the erection of an exhibition building in Venice on the grounds of the International Biennial. Messrs. Delano and Aldrich generously donated the plans for this building which is constructed of Istrian marble and pink brick and more than holds its own with the twenty-five other buildings in the Park owned by the various European governments."

The pavilion, owned and operated by the galleries, opened on May 4, 1930. Approximately 90 paintings and 12 sculptures were selected by Clark for the opening exhibition. Artists featured included Max Boehm, Hector Caser, Lillian Westcott Hale, Edward Hopper, Abraham Poole, Julius Rolshoven, Joseph Pollet, Eugene Savage, Elmer Shofeld, Ofelia Keelan, and African-American artist Henry Tanner. U.S. Ambassador John W. Garrett opened the show together with the Duke of Bergamo.

The Grand Central Art Galleries operated the U.S. Pavilion until 1954, when it was sold to the Museum of Modern Art (MOMA). Throughout the 1950s and 1960s shows were organized by MOMA, Art Institute of Chicago, and Baltimore Museum of Art. The Modern withdrew from the Biennale in 1964, and the United States Information Agency ran the Pavilion until it was sold to the Guggenheim Foundation courtesy of funds provided by the Peggy Guggenheim Collection.

Financial support by Philip Morris and private money raised by the Committee for the 1986 American Pavilion at the 1986 Venice Biennale made the exhibition at the United States pavilion possible. Since 1986 the Peggy Guggenheim Collection has worked with the United States Information Agency, the US Department of State and the Fund for Artists at International Festivals and Exhibitions in the organization of the visual arts exhibitions at the US Pavilion, while the Solomon R. Guggenheim Foundation has organized the comparable shows at the Architecture Biennales. Every two years museum curators from across the U.S. detail their visions for the American pavilion in proposals that are reviewed by the NEA Federal Advisory Committee on International Exhibitions (FACIE), a group comprising curators, museum directors and artists who then submit their recommendations to the public-private Fund for United States Artists at International Festivals and Exhibitions. Traditionally the endowment's selection committee has chosen a proposal submitted by a museum or curator, but in 2004 it simply chose an artist who in turn has nominated a curator, later approved by the State Department.

According to estimates provided by The New York Times, the cost of the pavilion's exhibitions has risen substantially over the years, from about $72,400 in 1964 for Robert Rauschenberg’s exhibition (about $720,000 in 2023 dollars) to nearly $2.5 million (roughly $4.4 million today) for Robert Gober (2001), $3.8 million for Martin Puryear (2019) and $7 million for Simone Leigh (2022).

== Notable Exhibitions ==
=== 1964 ===
Rauschenberg's selection for the 1964 Golden Lion marked the United States' ascendancy over European artistic dominance, and the entrance of pop art into canon.

=== 2026 ===
The 2026 appointment of an artist to represent the United States was delayed for months. The selection process is typically carried out by the National Endowment for the Arts, but due to "time constraints and staffing transitions" at the NEA this year, it was the Bureau of Educational and Cultural Affairs at the State Department that ultimately took on the responsibility. A potential candidate, Robert Lazzarini, was informed and ready to announce in time for the deadline at the end of September, until negotiations failed between his selected institutional partner, the University of South Florida, and the State Department. Due to the withdrawal of this initial selection, and the subsequent government shutdown which was the longest in US history, the final selection of Alma Allen was not announced until the end of November, two months past schedule. Allen was selected by a new entity called the American Arts Conservatory (AAC), which was founded in April 2025, and worked with Jeffrey Uslip, who will curate the exhibition, to create the proposal that ultimately was selected.

The fraught selection process was not just due to the delays in the process, but also because of the changes to the language of the application itself. New language about "American values" was added, while all mentions of diversity were removed. The altered language sparked several controversial proposals with Trump at the center. While the galleries have not responded for comment, the two galleries who were representing Allen previously removed him from their rosters following his selection for the Biennale. Allen is now being represented by Perrotin, a French gallery.

== Representation by year ==
=== Art ===
#	Year	Artist(s)	Curator(s)	Show notes	Ref
61th	2026	Alma Allen	Jeffrey Uslip	Call Me the Breeze, presents biomorphic sculptures inspired by the expansive landscapes of the Americas. The exhibition explores the concept of elevation, both as a physical manifestation of form and as a symbol of self realization. Commissioned by The American Arts Conservancy (AAC).	
60th	2024	Jeffrey Gibson	Kathleen Ash-Milby, Abigail Winograd	the space in which to place me, Gibson was the first Indigenous artist to represent the United States with a solo show. Commissioned by Portland Art Museum and SITE Santa Fe.	
59th	2022	Simone Leigh	Jill Medvedow, Eva Respini	Sovereignty, Leigh was the first Black woman to represent the United States with a solo show.	
58th	2019	Martin Puryear	Brooke Kamin Rapaport	Liberty/Libertà	
57th	2017	Mark Bradford	Christopher Bedford, Katy Siegel	Tomorrow Is Another Day	
56th	2015	Joan Jonas	Paul C. Ha, Ute Meta Bauer	They Come to Us without a Word	
55th	2013	Sarah Sze	Holly Block, Carey Lovelace	Triple Point	
54th	2011	Allora & Calzadilla	Lisa Freiman	Gloria	
53rd	2009	Bruce Nauman	Carlos Basualdo, Michael R. Taylor	Topological Gardens; won Golden Lion for best national pavilion	
52nd	2007	Félix González-Torres	Nancy Spector	America	
51st	2005	Ed Ruscha	Linda Norden, Donna De Salvo	Course of Empire	
50th	2003	Fred Wilson	Kathleen Goncharov	Speak of Me as I Am	
49th	2001	Robert Gober	Olga Viso, James Rondeau		
48th	1999	Ann Hamilton	Katy Kline, Helaine Posner	myein	
47th	1997	Robert Colescott	Mimi Roberts	Colescott was the first Black man to represent the United States with a solo exhibition	
46th	1995	Bill Viola	Marilyn A. Zeitlin		
45th	1993	Louise Bourgeois	Charlotta Kotik		
44th	1990	Jenny Holzer	Michael Auping		
43rd	1988	Jasper Johns	Mark Rosenthal		
42nd	1986	Isamu Noguchi	Henry Geldzahler		
41st	1984	Eric Fischl, Charles Garabedian, Melissa Miller, and others	Marcia Tucker, Lynn Gumpert, Ned Rifkin		
40th	1982	Jess, Robert Smithson, Richard Pousette-Dart	Thomas W. Leavitt, Robert Hobbs		
39th	1980	Vito Acconci, Christo, Laurie Anderson, and others	Janet Kardon		
38th	1978	Harry Callahan, Richard Diebenkorn	Robert T. Buck, Jr., Peter Bunnell, Linda Cathcart		
37th	1976	Richard Artschwager, Charles Garabedian, Robert Irwin, Donald Judd, Agnes Martin, Robert Motherwell, Ed Ruscha, Robert Ryman, Joel Shapiro, Richard Tuttle, Andy Warhol, H. C. Westermann	Thomas M. Messer, Hugh M. Davies, Sam Hunter, Rosalind Krauss, Marcia Tucker		
36th	1972	Diane Arbus, Ronald Davis, Richard Estes, Sam Gilliam, Jim Nutt, Keith Sonnier	Walter Hopps	Arbus, posthumously, became the first photographer to be shown at the Biennale, and Gilliam became the first African-American to represent the United States at the Biennale.	
35th	1970	Jasper Johns, Josef Albers, Alexander Liberman, Sam Francis, Ed Ruscha	Lois A. Bingham, Henry T. Hopkins	Over half of the 47 invited artists boycotted the exhibition in protest of the Vietnam War. The boycott hurt the show's credibility. The Smithsonian retreated from international art shows following this threatened boycott.	
34th	1968	Leonard Baskin, Edwin Dickinson, Richard Diebenkorn, Red Grooms, James McGarrell, Reuben Nakian, Fairfield Porter, Byron Burford	—		
33rd	1966	Helen Frankenthaler, Ellsworth Kelly, Roy Lichtenstein, Jules Olitski	—		
32nd	1964	John Chamberlain, Jim Dine, Jasper Johns, Morris Louis, Kenneth Noland, Claes Oldenburg, Robert Rauschenberg, Frank Stella	Alan Solomon	Rauschenberg won the top award for his silkscreen paintings. The award was symbolic of art world power transfer from France to the United States.	
31st	1962	[[Dimitri Hadzi, Loren McIver, Jan Müller (artist) {{{last}}}]], Louise Nevelson	—		
30th	1960	Philip Guston, Hans Hofmann, Franz Kline, Theodore Roszak	Adelyn Dohme Breeskin		
29th	1958	?	—		
28th	1956	35 artists, including Lyonel Feininger, John Marin, Charles Sheeler, Edward Hopper, George Tooker, Jacob Lawrence, Joseph Stella, Georgia O'Keeffe, Mark Tobey, Hedda Sterne, Franz Kline, Jackson Pollock, Willem de Kooning	Katharine Kuh	American Artists Paint the City	
27th	1954	Willem de Kooning, Ben Shahn	—		
26th	1952	Alexander Calder, Stuart Davis, Edward Hopper, and Yasuo Kuniyoshi	—		
25th	1950	John Marin, Arshile Gorky, Willem de Kooning, Jackson Pollock, Hyman Bloom, Lee Gatch, Rico Lebrun	Alfred Barr, Alfred Frankfurter	Half of the show was dedicated to Marin, a modernist. The curators split the remaining half.	
24th	1948	79 artists including George Bellows, Thomas Hart Benton, Edward Hopper, Grant Wood, William Baziotes, Arshile Gorky, Jacob Lawrence, Mark Rothko, Theodoros Stamos, Mark Tobey	?		

=== Architecture ===
#	Year	Artist(s)	Curator(s)	Show notes	Ref

== Bibliography ==
- Russeth, Andrew (April 17, 2019). "The Venice Biennale: Everything You Could Ever Want to Know". ARTnews.
