= Anne Ellegood =

American museum director and curator

- Born: 1966 or 1967 (age 59–60); Portland, Oregon, U.S.
- Occupations: Museum director and curator
- Employer: Institute of Contemporary Art, Los Angeles (since 2019)

Anne Ellegood (born 1966 or 1967) is an American curator and museum director who is the executive director of the Institute of Contemporary Art, Los Angeles.

Ellegood joined the Hammer Museum in Los Angeles as a curator in 2009, and embarked on projects including the museum's "Made in L.A." biennials in 2012 and 2018 (both collaborations) and a controversial retrospective on Jimmie Durham in 2017. She assumed her current position in 2019.

== Early curatorial work ==
After graduating from the University of Colorado Boulder, where she studied women's studies, Ellegood worked at a women's reproductive health clinic for several years. During those years, she freelanced as an assistant for an independent art curator, which led her to pursue a career in curatorial practice. She undertook graduate studies at the Center for Curatorial Studies at New York's Bard College, graduating in 1998.

After completing the program at Bard College, Ellegood was a curator at the New Museum for five years and then was curator of businessman Peter Norton's art collection in New York. She took a role at the Hirshhorn Museum and Sculpture Garden in Washington, D.C. in 2005. She would consider the first mentor in her curatorial career, New Museum founder Marcia Tucker, the most influential.

== Hammer Museum (2009–2019) ==
On invitation by its director, Ann Philbin, Ellegood joined the Hammer Museum, which is affiliated with the University of California, Los Angeles. She started as a curator in 2009. For the 2011 Venice Biennale, she organized artist Hany Armanious' exhibition for the Australian pavilion. The following year, a team of Hammer Museum and LAXART curators, including Ellegood, organized the museum's inaugural "Made in L.A." biennial, which featured work by 60 Los Angeles artists in museums and spaces throughout the city. In 2014, she and art historian Johanna Burton organized the exhibition "Take It or Leave It: Institution, Image, Ideology", which the museum described as "the first large-scale exhibition to focus on the intersection of two vitally important genres of contemporary art: appropriation [...] and institutional critique".

A 2017 retrospective exhibition organized by Ellegood on artist Jimmie Durham opened at the Hammer Museum and traveled to the Walker Art Center in Minneapolis, the Whitney Museum in New York City, and Remai Modern in Saskatoon, Canada. Although it garnered critical attention, the exhibition attracted controversy regarding his self-identification as Cherokee. (Note: Regarding Durham's claim to Cherokee identity, tribal representatives wrote in Indian Country Today: "Durham is neither enrolled nor eligible for citizenship in any of the three federally-recognized and historical Cherokee Tribes: the Eastern Band of Cherokee Indians, the United Keetoowah Band of Cherokee Indians of Oklahoma, and the Cherokee Nation.") In response to criticism of the show, such as an editorial in Indian Country Today, she wrote in Artnet News that the family history information provided by his critics was "incomplete and limited" and was critical of binary thinking on the matter. Earlier, Ellegood worked on a proposal with Durham and artist Sam Durant for the American pavilion at the 2007 Venice Biennale, but Durham withdrew from consideration because he felt problems would arise from his lack of tribal enrollment.

In 2018, Ellegood was one of thirty curators, museum directors, and art world figures who signed an open letter to the New York Times in support of the politically outspoken director Laura Raicovich upon her resignation from the Queens Museum. Shortly after, the museum held the fourth iteration of the "Made in L.A." biennial, which was curated by Erin Christovale and Ellegood. The curators showcased 32 artists of a "diverse group, both demographically as well as in the type of work they are making", according to Artnet News, and tried to avoid a focus on works that responded to the actions of the Donald Trump administration.

The Institute of Contemporary Art, Los Angeles (ICA LA) and the Hammer Museum jointly hosted the exhibition Witch Hunt leading up to the 2020 U.S. presidential election. Organized by the institutions' respective curators, Connie Butler and Ellegood, the exhibition includes fifteen mid-career women artists. The ARTnews reviewer found: "Using the witch hunt as a framework... [the curators] implied that there is something witchy about the women artists represented here, that they may bring to light certain truths that could trigger mobs." At the 2020 iteration of the Armory Show, an international art show in New York City, Ellegood led one of three curated sections, "Platform".

== Museum administration (2019–present) ==
Following the retirement of executive director Elsa Longhauser, the Institute of Contemporary Art, Los Angeles, appointed Ellegood to lead the museum in 2019. Museum administrators and curators Apsara DiQuinzio, Rita Gonzalez and Ellegood were noted to be part of a "core group" in the development of the Feminist Art Coalition, which was announced in late 2019. In 2024, the museum announced plans to purchase its building in the Arts District and an expansion which would include a café and space and studios for its artists-in-residence.

While at ICA LA, Ellegood co-curated the exhibition Scratching at the Moon, alongside UCLA professor and ceramicist Anna Sew Hoy. The exhibition was awarded "Best Thematic Group Show at an American Art Museum" by ARTnews.

== See also ==
- Women in the art history field
