= Feminist Art Coalition =

Art organization from us

The Feminist Art Coalition (FAC) is a collaboration of over 100 art museums and nonprofit institutions from across the United States. The organizations are collectively creating a series of programming and exhibitions centered around feminist thought to be held beginning in the fall of 2020, during the run-up of the presidential election. The project was initially planned to occur from September through November 2020, but has been extended through the end of 2021 due to changes in exhibition schedules resulting from the COVID-19 pandemic.

== History ==
A feminist art initiative was conceived by Apsara DiQuinzio in early 2017 in response to the 2016 presidential election and the grassroots organization of the Women's March in Washington, D.C., that followed. DiQuinzio, a curator at the Berkeley Art Museum and Pacific Film Archive, in the lead up to the 2020 presidential election, planned a series of arts programming centering on feminist ideas. The concept for the FAC was largely inspired by the model of Getty's Pacific Standard Time. The Warhol Foundation for the Visual Arts awarded a $50,000 curatorial grant to the Feminist Art Coalition in 2017, which provided the necessary funding to the working group to plan and shape the project together and the development of the website.

In spring 2018, the working group of curators convened in Berkeley and a roundtable titled Feminist Curatorial Practices was held on campus, hosted by Julia Bryan-Wilson and the Arts Research Center; attendants of a colloquium in Berkeley included Adrienne Edwards, Rita Gonzalez, and Henriette Huldisch.

The organizers of the Feminist Art Coalition have emphasized that the initiative is gender-inclusive and recognizes a plurality of different feminisms.

== Events ==
The events scheduled to take place as part of the Feminist Art Coalition include exhibitions, symposiums, surveys, and performances that span from fall 2020 through the end of 2021.

=== Exhibitions ===
Retrospective exhibitions are being held by several institutions, such as Joan Mitchell: Fierce Beauty co-presented by the Baltimore Museum of Art and San Francisco Museum of Modern Art and Andrea Bowers at the Museum of Contemporary Art, Chicago.

Group exhibitions centering themes relevant to feminisms, such as voting rights, activism, domesticity, labor, and the body will also be presented at many institutions. The Institute of Contemporary Art, Los Angeles and the Hammer Museum are hosting the exhibition Witch Hunt, which examines sociopolitical constructs through a feminist lens. The exhibition includes 15 international artists and was curated by Anne Ellegood and Connie Butler.

Berkeley Art Museum and Pacific Film Archive (BAMPFA) will present New Time: Art and Feminisms in the 21st Century, a major survey exploring recent feminist practices in contemporary art. The exhibition will illuminate a diverse range of art across all mediums by artists of all genders who are integrating feminist thought into innovative artistic approaches across a wide array of themes.

In addition to group exhibitions, a number of solo exhibitions are being held as a part of the coalition. Solo exhibitors include Howardena Pindell at The Shed, Fernanda Laguna at The Drawing Center and the Institute for Contemporary Art at Virginia Commonwealth University, Lynn Hershman Leeson at the New Museum, and Genesis Belanger at The Aldrich Contemporary Art Museum.

=== Performances ===
GYOPO, a coalition of diasporic Korean artists, curators, writers, cultural producers, and art professionals, will present a Los Angeles marathon reading of Theresa Hak Kyung Cha’s seminal Dictee in conjunction with the University of Southern California.

Also in Los Angeles, LAND (Los Angeles Nomadic Division) presents Gatherings, an exhibition of public sculptures, performances, and programs that reimagine public sculpture as conduits for nurturing artistic and contemplative practices.

=== Screenings ===
EMPAC at Rensselaer will premiere Dicen que cabalga sobre un tigre (They say she rides a tiger) by Beatriz Santiago Muñoz. The film entwines the linguistic structure of Monique Wittig’s 1969 feminist novel Les Guérillères with the material and conceptual ground of the Caribbean.

San Francisco Museum of Modern Art will present No Day of Rest! Screenings of Many, Many Women, foregrounding the resistance by women in art, film, and music. Included are films by Sini Anderson, Jeanne C. Finley, Eve Fowler, Kelly Gallagher, Delphine Seyrig, as well as Cauleen Smith.

=== Symposiums ===
LAXART, Los Angeles will present Life on Earth: An Ecofeminist Art Symposium in advance of the group exhibition Life on Earth: Ecofeminist Art since 1979. The Women Photographers International Archive (WOPHA) will host the Women Photographers International Congress in November 2021.
