= Kathleen Ash-Milby =

Navajo curator

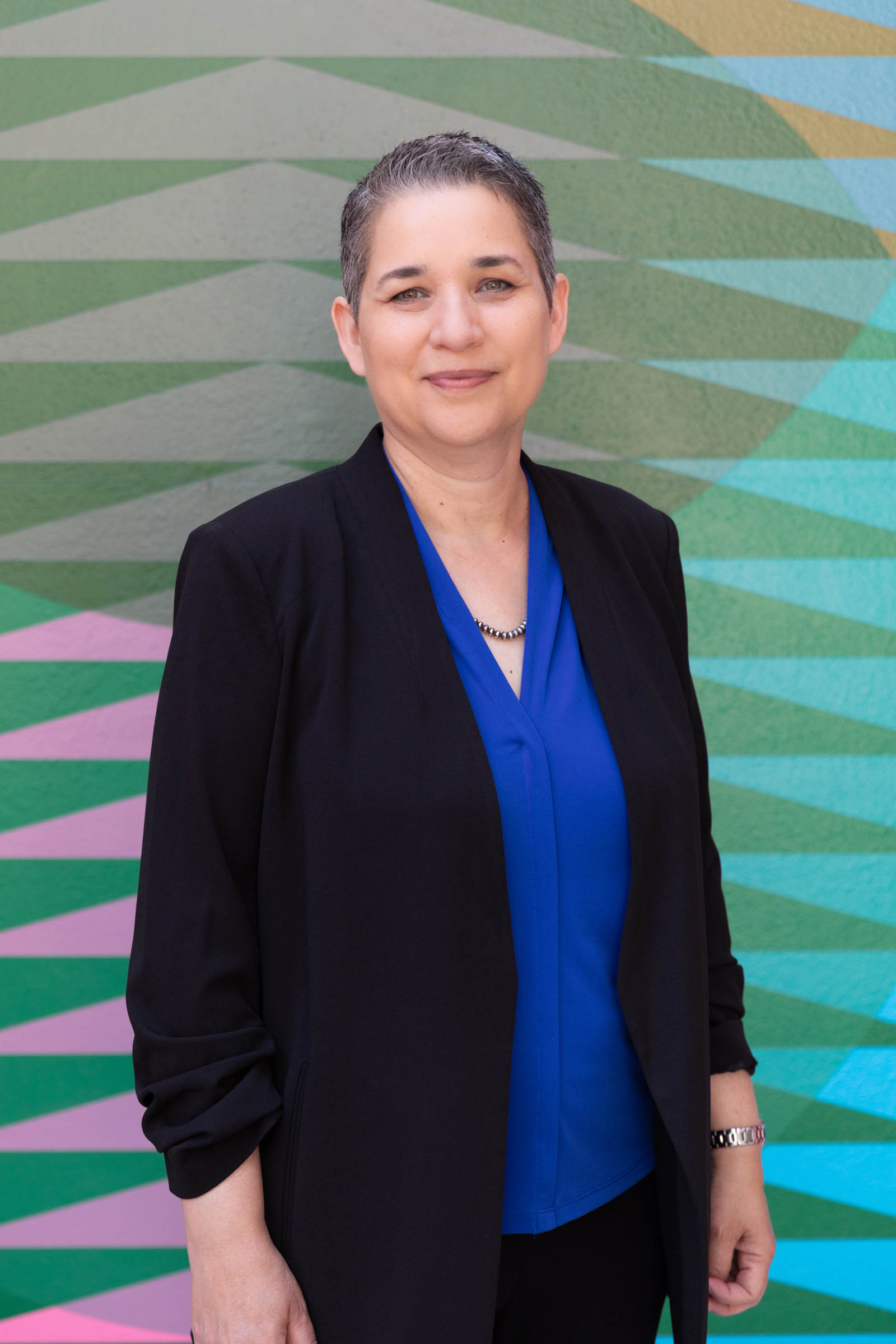
- Ash-Milby at La Biennale di Venezia, 2024, by Federica Carlet
- Born: Albuquerque, New Mexico
- Citizenship: Navajo Nation, United States
- Education: University of Washington (B.A.); University of New Mexico (M.A.)
- Occupations: Curator, art historian
- Years active: 2001–present
- Employer: Portland Art Museum
- Title: Curator of Native American Art

Kathleen Ash-Milby is a Navajo art historian and curator. She is currently the Curator of Native American Art at the Portland Art Museum. She previously worked at the National Museum of the American Indian's George Gustav Heye Center for two decades.

In 2024, Ash-Milby was a commissioner and curator of the exhibition for the American pavilion at the 60th Venice Biennale featuring artist Jeffrey Gibson.

== Early life and education ==
Kathleen Ash-Milby was born in Albuquerque, New Mexico. She is an enrolled member of the Navajo Nation.

Ash-Milby attended Pacific Lutheran University and studied studio art before transferring to the University of Washington to study art history. She graduated in 1991 with a bachelor's degree in art history. During the summer after her junior year, she was an intern at the Metropolitan Museum of Art in New York City, an experience she credited with inspiring her to pursue a career in museums. Ash-Milby received a master's degree in Native American art history from the University of New Mexico.

== Career ==
=== Early curatorial career ===
Ash-Milby began her career as a curatorial research assistant at the Smithsonian's National Museum of the American Indian (NMAI) Research Branch, the original collections facility in the Bronx, NY, for the Museum of the American Indian.

=== American Indian Community House ===
In 2000 Ash-Milby began working at the American Indian Community House (AICH) Gallery, a New York nonprofit that provides services for Native people living in the city. Ash-Milby served as curator and co-director of the AICH Gallery with AICH executive director Rosemary Richmond. In 2005, Ash-Milby curated a solo show for the gallery by artist Jeffrey Gibson.

=== National Museum of the American Indian ===
Ash-Milby returned to the NMAI's Heye Center in 2005, first as an assistant curator and eventually as an associate curator.

While at NMAI, Ash-Milby organized a large number of exhibitions, including a solo show by Edgar Heap of Birds produced as a collateral exhibition for the 52nd Venice Biennale, and solo shows at the museum by C. Maxx Stevens (2012), Julie Buffalohead in (2012), Meryl McMaster (2015), and Kay WalkingStick (2015). She also produced several thematic exhibitions for the museum, including Off the Map: Landscape in the Native Imagination (2007); HIDE: Skin as Material and Metaphor (2010); and Transformer: Native Art in Light and Sound (2017).

Ash-Milby's final exhibition for NMAI, a retrospective on artist Oscar Howe, opened in 2022 after her departure, and became a joint project with the Portland Art Museum.

=== Portland Art Museum ===
In 2018 Ash-Milby was named Curator of Native American Art at the Portland Art Museum (PAM), where she began in 2019.

Ash-Milby has overseen the repatriation of several objects, artifacts, and artworks from the museum's collection by Native makers that had been improperly purchased by their donors, which she said was a priority in her time at the museum.

In conjunction with the 60th Venice Biennale in 2024, Ash-Milby commissioned and co-curated artist Jeffrey Gibson's solo exhibition The Space in Which to Place Me for the American pavilion. The exhibition, commissioned by the PAM and SITE Santa Fe, was the first solo exhibition by an Indigenous artist to represent the United States at the Biennale, and Ash-Milby was the first Indigenous person to curate an exhibition for the American pavilion.

== Publications ==
=== Books ===
- The American West: People, Places, and Ideas (2001). By Kathleen Ash-Milby and Suzan Campbell. Corning, New York: Rockwell Museum. ISBN 9781889921143
- First American Art: The Charles and Valerie Diker Collection of American Indian Art (2004). By Kathleen Ash-Milby, Bruce Bernstein, and Gerald McMaster (eds.). Washington, D.C. / Seattle: National Museum of the American Indian / University of Washington Press. ISBN 9780295984032
- Off the Map: Landscape in the Native Imagination (2007). By Kathleen Ash-Milby, Kate Morris, and Paul Chaat Smith (eds.). Washington, D.C.: National Museum of the American Indian. ISBN 9781933565088
- Most Serene Republics: Edgar Heap of Birds (2009). By Kathleen Ash-Milby and Truman Lowe (eds.). Washington, D.C.: National Museum of the American Indian. ISBN 9781933565125
- Hide: Skin as Material and Metaphor (2010). By Kathleen Ash-Milby (ed.). Washington, D.C.: National Museum of the American Indian. ISBN 9781933565156
- Kay WalkingStick: An American Artist (2015). By Kathleen Ash-Milby and David W. Penney (eds.). Washington, D.C.: National Museum of the American Indian. ISBN 9781588345103
- Dakota Modern: The Art of Oscar Howe (2022). By Kathleen Ash-Milby and Bill Anthes (eds.). Washington, D.C.: National Museum of the American Indian. ISBN 9781933565330

=== Chapters ===
- "Indian Identity and Evaluating the Past: Bonita Wa Wa Calachaw Nuñez, an Indian Princess Painter". By Kathleen Ash-Milby. In Joyce M. Szabo (ed.): Painters, Patrons, and Identity: Essays in Native American Art to Honor J.J. Brody (2001). Albuquerque, New Mexico: University of New Mexico Press. ISBN 9780826320254
- "Finding Our Way: Negotiating Community at the American Indian Community House". By Kathleen Ash-Milby. In Lee-Ann Martin (ed.): Making a Noise!: Aboriginal Perspectives on Art, Art History, Critical Writing and Community (2004). Banff, Alberta: Banff International Curatorial Institute. ISBN 9781894773133
- "Landscape: Through an Interior View". By Kathleen Ash-Milby. In Duane Blue Spruce and Tanya Thrasher (eds.): The Land Has Memory: Indigenous Knowledge, Native Landscapes, and the National Museum of the American Indian (2008). Chapel Hill, North Carolina / Washington, D.C.: University of North Carolina Press / National Museum of the American Indian. ISBN 9780807889787
- "Alan Michelson: Landscapes of Loss and Presence". By Kathleen Ash-Milby. In Jennifer Complo McNutt and Ashley Holland (eds.): We Are Here!: The Eiteljorg Contemporary Art Fellowship 2011 (2011). Indianapolis / Seattle: Eiteljorg Museum / University of Washington Press. ISBN 9780295991795
- "Native Makers/New Media". By Kathleen Ash-Milby. In Erika Suderburg and Ming-Yuen S. Ma (eds.): Resolutions 3: Global Networks of Video (2012). Minneapolis: University of Minnesota Press. ISBN 9780816670833
- "'Back Where I Were Born': Joseph E. Yoakum and the Imaginary Indian". By Kathleen Ash-Milby. In Mark Pascale, Esther Adler, and Édouard Kopp (eds.): Joseph E. Yoakum: What I Saw (2021). Houston / New York / Chicago / New Haven, Connecticut: Menil Collection / Museum of Modern Art / Art Institute of Chicago / Yale University Press. ISBN 9780300257489

=== Articles ===
- "Woven by the Grandmothers: Twenty-Four Blankets Travel to the Navajo Nation". By Kathleen Ash-Milby and Susan Heald (1998). Journal of the American Institute for Conservation. 38 (3): 334–345. Washington, D.C.: American Institute for the Conservation of Historic and Artistic Works / Routledge. OCLC 3064874.
- "Gerald McMaster, ed. 'Reservation X: The Power of Place in Aboriginal Contemporary Art'" (book review). By Kathleen Ash-Milby (Summer 2000). Great Plains Quarterly. Vol. 20, no. 3. pp. 244–245. OCLC 7235796.
- "Inclusivity or Sovereignty? Native American Arts in the Gallery and the Museum since 1992". By Kathleen Ash-Milby and Ruth B. Phillips (Summer 2017). Art Journal. 76 (2): 10–38. New York: College Art Association. OCLC 1514294.
- "Art That Moves". By Kathleen Ash-Milby (Fall 2017). American Indian. Vol. 18, no. 3. Washington, D.C.: National Museum of the American Indian. OCLC 1313829604.
- "Art Warriors and Wooden Indians". By Kathleen Ash-Milby (October 2017). Art in America. Vol. 105, no. 9. OCLC 1121298647.
- "Knowledge positions in Aotearoa and Turtle Island art museums". By Kathleen Ash-Milby, Maia Nuku, and Nigel Borell (June 2020). Artlink. 40 (2): 12–22. OCLC 30806709.
