= Barbara Bloom =

Barbara Bloom may refer to:

- Barbara Bloom (television executive), American television executive and writer
- Barbara Bloom (artist) (born 1951), American conceptual artist
