= Jeffrey Uslip =

American art curator

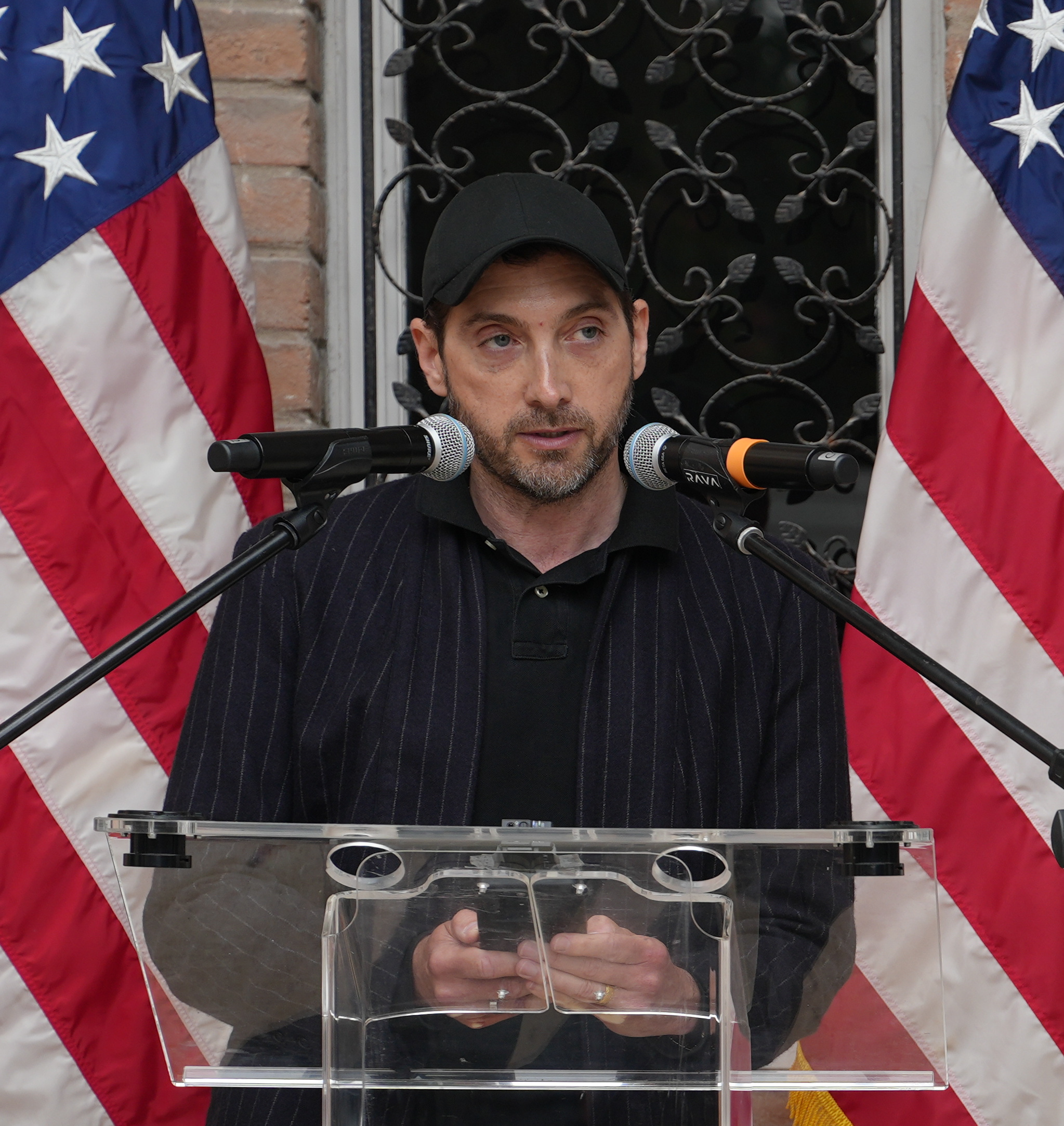
- Jeffrey Uslip at the 2026 Venice Biennale
- Occupation: Art curator
- Known for: Art Curator of the 2026 American Pavilion

Jeffrey Uslip is an independent American art curator most known for curating the American Pavilion at the 2026 Venice Biennale and selecting Utah-born Alma Allen to represent the United States.

== Career ==
Uslip has held curatorial jobs at PS1, which is part of the Museum of Modern Art, and the Santa Monica Museum of Art, which is now known as the Institute of Contemporary Art, Los Angeles. In 2005, he put together a group show in New York City at Artists Space which examined “the impact of neo-conservatism on queer representations in America.”

In 2014, Uslip became the chief curator at the Contemporary Art Museum St. Louis, where he opened a 2016 show at CAM by Kelley Walker, a white Southerner whose art explores racism and violence. Shortly thereafter, it was announced he departed CAM to take a position at the Bass Museum of Art in Miami Beach, which did not happen. In 2022, he curated the Malta Pavilion at the 2022 Venice Biennale. In 2026 he curated the American Pavilion at the 2026 Venice Biennale.
