= Mohammadreza Mirzaei =

Iranian photographer and writer (born 1994)

Installation of Mohammadreza Mirzaei's Humans series at Empty Quarter Gallery

Mohammadreza Mirzaei (Persian: محمدرضا میرزایی; born 1986) is an Iranian photographer and writer, living in Santa Barbara, California.

== Education ==
Mirzaei studied graphic design at IRIB Art School and Italian Literature at Azad University in Tehran. In 2012, he moved to Philadelphia to pursue his MFA at University of Pennsylvania. He then went on to obtain a Ph.D. from the University of California Santa Barbara. As of now, he is a current professor of art history at University of California Santa Barbara.

== Work ==
In 2006, Mirzaei did a photo series called Humans, which has been exhibited in 4 solo shows in Iran, Turkey, UAE and Russia as well as in some group exhibitions in Australia and Italy. Michael Kenna has acclaimed this photo series by an essay: Mr. Mirzaei, with reserved sensibility, kindly provides us with an opportunity to quietly reflect and consider the reasons for our existence. It is a worthy subject to ponder, and this is a worthy group of photographs. Mirzaei's photographs have been also credited by his compatriot photographer Mitra Tabrizian, who admired the surreal quality and the sense of isolation in his works.

In 2008, his photo series Rewind won the first prize of the 3rd photo feast of Tehran's University of Art.

In Mirzaei's series The Encounters he photographed other people in the act of making photographs.

Mirzaei's book What I Don't Have (2013) contains a long story and a photo series.

Mirzaei is the translator of La Grammatica di Dio, short stories by Stefano Benni from the Italian to the Persian.

He is founding editor of Dide Magazine and was one of the jurors of International Photobook Award in 2011. His photos have been exhibited in different biennials and annuals including Bogotá Fotográfica in 2011 and Journées photographiques de Bienne in 2012.

== Publications ==
- What I Don't Have. Bradipo, 2013.
- Here Comes The Sun. University of Pennsylvania Common Press, 2014. With an essay by Carlos Basualdo.
- Dialectics of Seeing. Blue Tiger, 2018. With Gordon Stillman.
- Postcards. Blue Tiger, 2019.
