= Dreams Have No Titles =

Art exhibition in Venice, Italy

Dreams Have No Titles is an art exhibition by Zineb Sedira shown in the French pavilion of the 2022 Venice Biennale.
