= Fred Wilson (artist) =

American artist (born 1954)

- Born: 1954 (age 71–72); New York City, US
- Education: BFA, SUNY Purchase
- Known for: Conceptual art
- Awards: MacArthur Fellowship; Larry Aldrich Foundation Award

Fred Wilson (born 1954) is an American artist of African-American and Caribbean heritage. He received a BFA from Purchase College, State University of New York. Wilson challenges colonial assumptions on history, culture, and race – encouraging viewers to consider the social and historical narratives that represent the western canon. Wilson received a MacArthur Foundation "genius grant" in 1999 and the Larry Aldrich Foundation Award in 2003. Wilson represented the United States at the Biennial Cairo in 1992 and the Venice Biennale in 2003. In May 2008, it was announced that Wilson would become a Whitney Museum trustee replacing Chuck Close.

== Career ==
An alumnus of Music & Art High School in New York, Wilson received a BFA from SUNY Purchase in 1976, where he was the only black student in his program. While studying Wilson worked as a guard at the Neuberger Museum. Between 1978 and 1980, he worked as an artist in East Harlem as part of the Comprehensive Employment and Training Act's (CETA) employment of artists.

He says that he no longer has a strong desire to make things with his hands. "I get everything that satisfies my soul," he says, "from bringing together objects that are in the world, manipulating them, working with spatial arrangements, and having things presented in the way I want to see them."

An installation artist and political activist, Wilson's subject is social justice and his medium is museology. In the 1970s, he worked as a free-lance museum educator for the American Museum of Natural History, the Metropolitan Museum of Art and the American Craft Museum. Beginning in the late 1980s, Wilson used his insider skills to create "Rooms with a View", a series of "mock museums" that address how museums consciously or unwittingly reinforce racist beliefs and behaviors. This strategy, which Wilson refers to as "a trompe l'oeil of museum space," has increasingly become the focus of his life's work.

In 1987, as part of his outdoor "Platform" series, Wilson created No Noa Noa, Portrait of a History of Tahiti, designed to illustrate "how Western societies turn Third World peoples into exotic sideshow creatures to entertain and titillate but who are not to be taken seriously."

In his 1992 seminal work co-organized with the Contemporary Museum Baltimore, Mining the Museum, Wilson reshuffled the Maryland Historical Society's collection to highlight the history of Native and African Americans in Maryland. In 1994, Wilson continued in this vein with Insight: In Site: In Sight: Incite in Winston-Salem, North Carolina, where, according to art historian Richard J. Powell, his "re-positioning of historical objects and manipulation of exhibition labels, lighting, and other display techniques helped reveal aspects of the site's tragic African-American past that (because of the conspiratorial forces of time, ignorance, and racism) had largely become invisible."

In 2001, Wilson was the subject of a retrospective, Fred Wilson: Objects and Installations, 1979–2000, organized by Maurice Berger for the Center for Art, Design and Visual Culture at the University of Maryland, Baltimore County. The show traveled to numerous venues, including the Santa Monica Museum of Art, Berkeley Museum of Art, Blaffer Gallery (University of Houston), Tang Teaching Museum and Art Gallery (Skidmore College, Saratoga Springs, NY), The Addison Gallery of American Art in Andover, Massachusetts, Chicago Cultural Center, Studio Museum in Harlem. For the 2003 Venice Biennale, Wilson created a multi-media installation that borrowed its title from a line in Othello. His elaborate Venice work "Speak of Me as I Am" focused on representations of Africans in Venetian culture.

In 2007 Fred Wilson was invited to be a part of the Indianapolis, Indiana, Cultural trail. Wilson proposed to redo the sole African American depicted in the Soldiers and Sailors Monument in downtown Indianapolis. The African American represents a recently freed slave reaching up to lady liberty. Wilson planned on using a scan of the African American to make an entirely new work, which would give the African American a more proud and strong posture, holding a flag composed of all of the African countries' flags. The proposed work was entitled, E Pluribus Unum, and was met with much controversy, eventually leading to the project's rejection.

In 2009, Wilson was awarded the Cheek Medal by William & Mary's Muscarelle Museum of Art. The Cheek Medal is a national arts award given by The College of William & Mary to those who have contributed significantly to the field of museum, performing or visual arts.

2011 saw the publication of Fred Wilson: A Critical Reader by Ridinghouse, edited by Doro Globus. An anthology of critical texts about and interviews with the artist, this publication focuses on the artist's pivotal exhibitions and projects, and includes a wide range of significant texts that mark the critical reception of Wilson's work over the last two decades.

== Major themes ==
Artemis / Bast (1992) at the Baltimore Museum of Art in 2022

Wilson's unique artist approach is to examine, question, and deconstruct the traditional display of art and artifacts in museums. With the use of new wall labels, sounds, lighting, and non-traditional pairings of objects, he leads viewers to recognize that changes in context create changes in meaning. Wilson's juxtaposition of evocative objects forces the viewer to question the biases and limitations of cultural institutions and how they have shaped the interpretation of historical truth, artistic value, and the language of display. According to Wilson, "Museums ignore and often deny the other meanings [of objects]. In my experience it is because if an alternate meaning is not the subject of the exhibition or the focus of the museum, it is considered unimportant by the museum." Wilson uses these objects to analyze the representation of race in museums and to examine the power and privileges of cultural institutions.

For example, for his installation at the 2003 Venice Biennale he employed a tourist to pretend to be an African street vendor selling fake designer bags — in fact his own designs. He also incorporated "blackamoors", sculptures of black people in the role of servants, into the show. Such figures were often used as stands for lights. Wilson placed his wooden blackamoors carrying acetylene torches and fire extinguishers. He noted that such figures are so common in Venice that few people notice them, stating, "they are in hotels everywhere in Venice...which is great, because all of a sudden you see them everywhere. I wanted it to be visible, this whole world which sort of just blew up for me."

== Mining the Museum exhibition ==
Mining the Museum was an exhibition created by Fred Wilson held from April 4, 1992, to February 28, 1993, at the Maryland Historical Society.

Background

The title of the exhibition refers to how Wilson extracted and unearthed objects from the Maryland Historical Society collections to create this exhibition.The purpose of the exhibition was to address the biases museums have, often omitting or under-representing oppressed peoples and focusing on "prominent white men". Wilson took the existing museum's collection and reshuffled them to highlight the history of African-American and Native American Marylanders. This reassembly created a new viewpoint of colonization, slavery and abolition through the use of satire and irony.

Artifacts

Wilson juxtaposed historically important artifacts with each other to address the injustices in history and the injustices of not being properly exhibited. The entrance of the exhibition displayed three busts of important individuals: Napoleon, Andrew Jackson and Henry Clay displayed on pedestals. To the left of these busts were empty black pedestals with the names of three important, overlooked African American Marylanders: Frederick Douglass, Benjamin Banneker, and Harriet Tubman. Arranged in the center of these pedestals is a silver-plated copper globe with the word "Truth" inscribed on it in a case.

Wilson extracted paintings from the eighteenth century and nineteenth century featuring African Americans from the MHS collection. Within this collection Wilson renamed the paintings in order to shift the focus towards African Americans in them. One of the oil paintings titled "Country Life" was renamed "Frederick Serving Fruit" in order to emphasize and underline the young African American that was serving "well-dressed whites at a picnic". Other paintings featuring slave children were paired with audiotape recordings that played on a loop in which visitors were able to hear these children in the paintings ask various poignant questions. Wilson used these paintings to force visitors to recognize how the depiction of African Americans and their invisibility in portrayals of American life is "paradoxical".

The installation titled "metalwork" arranged ornate silverware with slave shackles to address that the prosperity of one could not have been achieved without the other. Similarly, "Cabinet Making" addresses more subjugation by having antique chairs gathered around and facing an authentic whipping post, incorrectly reported by several publications to have been used on slaves. In fact, the post had been used to punish wife-beaters in the Baltimore City jail. However, these false assumptions helped bolster Wilson's idea that the exhibit was "charged by what you bring to it." Pieces such as "Cabinet Making" encouraged visitors to interpret the works however they saw it, to think critically and acquire a new perspective. Other works included cigar-store Indians turned away from visitors, a KKK mask in a baby carriage, a hunting rifle with runaway slave posters and a black chandelier hung in the museum's neoclassical pavilion made for the exhibition.

Impact

The exhibition was successful in that it made visitors more historically conscious of the racism that is an integral part of American history. ""Mining the Museum" worked because it was suggestive rather than didactic, provocative rather than moralizing" More than 55,000 people viewed Wilson's exhibit and helped him create other similar exhibitions around the United States. Critics would coin this new type of work as "museumist art".

== 50th Venice Biennale ==
Wilson represented the United States at the 50th Venice Biennale, staging the solo exhibition Speak of Me as I Am (2003) in the American pavilion. A series of works was a reworking of Shakespeare's Othello that consisted of various objects such as mirrors and chandeliers that were used to comment on the text. These works have been extended on in the exhibition, Fred Wilson: Sculptures, Paintings, and Installations, 2004–2014. These objects are made of black Murano glass, which indicates how Wilson has transferred the context of Othello into a world where race is not ignored and is instead is a crucial central focus.

Afro Kismet, a mixed-media installation also included in the exhibition, focused on issues and representations of race in Venice, specifically the history of black people in Venice. The installation consisted of prints, paintings, and other artifacts from the Pera Museum collections and underlined the "discarded" or "hidden" history of African people in the Ottoman Empire.

== Other activities ==
From 1988 to 1992, Wilson served on the board of directors at Artists Space in TriBeCa, New York. He currently serves on the board of trustees of the Whitney Museum of American Art in New York.

Wilson co-chaired (with Naomi Beckwith) the jury that chose the winners of the Rome Prize for the 2023–24 cycle.

== Exhibitions ==
Wilson has staged a large number of solo shows and exhibitions in the United States and internationally. His notable solo shows include Primitivism: High & Low (1991), Metro Pictures Gallery, New York; Mining the Museum (1992-1993), Maryland Historical Society, Baltimore, and Contemporary Museum Baltimore; Fred Wilson: Objects and Installations 1979-2000 (2001-2003), originating at the Center for Art, Design and Visual Culture, Baltimore; Speak of Me as I Am (2003), American pavilion, 50th Venice Biennale; and Fred Wilson: Works 2004-2011 (2012-2013), Cleveland Museum of Art

He has also participated in many group exhibitions, including the Whitney Biennial (1993); Liverpool Biennial (1999); Glasstress (2009, 2011); and the NGV Triennial (2020).

== Notable works in public collections ==
- Colonial Collection (1990), Nasher Museum of Art, Durham, North Carolina
- Guarded View (1991), Whitney Museum, New York
- Addiction Display (1991), Pérez Art Museum Miami, Florida
- Queen Esther/Harriet Tubman (1992), Jewish Museum, New York
- Untitled (1992), Baltimore Museum of Art
- Untitled (1992), Harvard Art Museums, Cambridge, Massachusetts
- Grey Area (1993), Tate, London
- Mine/Yours (1994), Whitney Museum, New York
- Atlas (1995), Studio Museum in Harlem, New York
- Me and It (1995), San Francisco Museum of Modern Art
- Speak of Me as I Am: Chandelier Mori (2003), High Museum of Art, Atlanta
- Untitled (Venice Biennale) (2003), Mary and Leigh Block Museum of Art, Evanston, Illinois; and Smith College Museum of Art, Northampton, Massachusetts
- The Wanderer (2003), Berkeley Art Museum and Pacific Film Archive, California
- Arise! (2004), British Museum, London; Museum of Modern Art, New York; National Gallery of Art, Washington, D.C.; and Toledo Museum of Art, Ohio
- Convocation (2004), Metropolitan Museum of Art, New York; National Gallery of Art, Washington, D.C.; and Toledo Museum of Art, Ohio
- We Are All in the Gutter, But Some of Us are Looking at the Stars (2004), National Gallery of Art, Washington, D.C.; Studio Museum in Harlem, New York; and Toledo Museum of Art, Ohio
- X (2005), Berkeley Art Museum and Pacific Film Archive, California; Metropolitan Museum of Art, New York; and Whitney Museum, New York
- Pssst! (2005), National Gallery of Art, Washington, D.C.
- Dark Day, Dark Night (2006), Nasher Museum of Art, Durham, North Carolina
- The Mete of the Muse (2006), National Gallery of Victoria, Melbourne; and New Orleans Museum of Art
- The Ominous Glut (2006), Nelson-Atkins Museum of Art, Kansas City, Missouri
- Ota Benga (2008), Tate, London
- Flag (2009), Tate, London
- Iago's Mirror (2009), Des Moines Art Center, Iowa; Museum of Fine Arts, Boston; and Toledo Museum of Art, Ohio
- To Die Upon a Kiss (2011), Cleveland Museum of Art; Corning Museum of Glass, Corning, New York; Museum of Fine Arts, Houston; Museum of Modern Art, New York; and National Gallery of Victoria, Melbourne
- LIBERATION (2012), Allen Memorial Art Museum, Oberlin, Ohio
- I Saw Othello's Visage in His Mind (2013), Corning Museum of Glass, Corning, New York; and Smithsonian American Art Museum, Smithsonian Institution, Washington, D.C.
- Iago's Desdemona (2013), Currier Museum of Art, Manchester, New Hampshire
- Act V. Scene II—Exeunt Omnes (2014), Wichita Art Museum, Kansas
- Grinding Souls (2016), Allen Memorial Art Museum, Oberlin, Ohio
- The Way the Moon's in Love with the Dark (2017), Denver Art Museum
- Mother (2022), LaGuardia Airport Terminal C, New York
