= Sovereignty (disambiguation) =

Sovereignty is the defining authority within an individual consciousness, social construct or territory.

It may also refer to:

- Air sovereignty, the right of a sovereign state to regulate its airspace
- Consumer sovereignty, economic concept by which consumers have control over the production of goods through their consumer decisions
- Data sovereignty, the idea that data is subject to laws within the states it is collected
- Divine sovereignty, in Christianity
- Food sovereignty, systems in which food producers, distributors, and consumers control the policies and mechanisms of food production and distribution
- Individual sovereignty, the moral or natural right of a person to have control over their own body and life
- Network sovereignty, Internet boundaries within which a state exhibits control
- Parliamentary sovereignty, principle of constitutional law that the legislative body has authority over other government institutions
- Popular sovereignty, principle that state authority is derived from the consent of its people
- Sovereignty (art exhibition), American sculptor Simone Leigh's American pavilion exhibition at the 2022 Venice Biennale
- Sovereignty (horse), winner of the 2025 Kentucky Derby
- Westphalian sovereignty, principle of international law in which states have exclusive authority to govern their territory
- Sovereignty (Scotland)
