= Alma Allen =

Alma Allen may refer to:

- Alma Allen (resistance member), member of the Danish resistance against the Nazis in World War II in the early 1940s who later joined British intelligence
- Alma Allen (artist) (born 1970), American sculptor
- Alma Allen (politician) (born 1939), American politician
