= Amir George =

American filmmaker, artist, and curator

- Occupations: Director, Writer and Curator
- Years active: 2008–present

Amir George is an American filmmaker, artist, and curator. He is best known for Black Radical Imagination, an international touring experimental film program he co-founded with Erin Christovale.

== Career ==
Amir’s student film Sneaker Freak made waves on blogs in 2008. In 2011, he directed a short film The Mind of Delilah starring Thai Tyler and The Twilite Tone. In 2012, while working at Black Cinema House, Amir met Erin Christovale, the two formed a bond and began curating "Black Radical Imgaination. In 2017, he released a short film entitled Decadent Asylum.

Amir's films have screened at institutions and film festivals including Anthology Film Archives, Glasgow School of Art, Museum of Contemporary Art, Chicago, Ann Arbor Film Festival, Museum of Contemporary Art Detroit, Trinidad and Tobago Film Festival, BlackStar Film Festival, and Chicago Underground Film Festival, among others.

Amir has served as a film programmer for True/False Film Fest and Chicago International Film Festival.

== Black Radical Imagination ==
Black Radical Imagination is an international touring film program founded by Amir George and Erin Christovale. The films featured contextualized afrofuturist ideas through contemporary experimental films created by Black filmmakers. The first consecutive screenings took place in 2013 in Los Angeles, New York, and Chicago between Feb-May. In June that year, Black Radical Imagination was invited to screen at Mickalene Thomas’s Art Bar Installation, Better Days in Basel, Switzerland. The Black Radical Imagination curated film programs have screened in art and cultural institutions including MoMA PS1, MOCA, Museo Taller Jose Clemente Orozco, Schomburg Center for Research in Black Culture, Institute of Contemporary Arts and Museum of Contemporary Art, Chicago.

=== Filmography ===
Year	Film	Director	Writer	Producer	Notes
2022	Silence of Clarity	✓	✓	✓	Short Film
2020	Man of The People	✓	✓		Short Film
2020	Optimum Continuum 3.1	✓	✓	✓	Short Film
2015	Shades of Shadows	✓	✓	✓	Short Film
2017	Decadent Asylum	✓	✓	✓	Short Film
2014	Just A Place	✓	✓	✓	Short Film
2013	Mae’s Journal	✓	✓	✓	Short Film
2011	The Mind of Delilah	✓	✓	✓	Short Film
2008	Sneaker Freak	✓	✓	✓	Short Film
