= Erin Christovale =

- Education: USC School of Cinematic Arts
- Known for: Film curation
- Notable work: Black Radical Imagination; S/Election: Democracy, Citizenship, Freedom; Made in L.A. 2018

Erin Christovale is a Los Angeles–based curator and programmer who currently works as a curator at the Hammer Museum at the University of California, Los Angeles. Together with Hammer Museum senior curator Anne Ellegood, Christovale curated the museum's fourth Made in L.A. biennial in June 2018. She also leads Black Radical Imagination, an experimental film program she co-founded with Amir George. Black Radical Imagination tours internationally and has screened at MoMA PS1; Museum of Contemporary Art, Los Angeles; and the Museo Taller Jose Clemente Orozco, among other spaces. Christovale is best known for her work on identity, race and historical legacy. Prior to her appointment at the Hammer Museum, Christovale worked as a curator at the Los Angeles Municipal Art Gallery. She has a bachelor's degree from the University of Southern California School of Cinematic Arts.

== Curated Shows ==
=== S/Election: Democracy, Citizenship, Freedom (2016) ===
S/Election: Democracy, Citizenship, Freedom was a mixed-media show Christovale curated at the Los Angeles Municipal Gallery in 2016. The show featured works by 32 contemporary artists engaging with the concept of American citizenship, particularly in the context of the political climate surrounding the 2016 presidential election. Notable works in the exhibition included:

- "Index of Fear" (2015) by Margaret Noble: an interactive media archive where one can pick out sounds that correspond to fears such as "futility" and "forgotten"
- "Study for a Pattern or Practice" (2015) by Bethany Collins: a blind-embossed rendition of the table of contents from the Department of Justice report on the Ferguson Police Department after the August 2014 shooting of Michael Brown
- "Blessings All Around" (2011) by Olga Lah: an orange warning-barrier mesh repurposed as a draped garment on the wall
- "We Are America" (2011) by Monica Rodriguez: inscribed protest slogans on eight American flags that hung from the ceiling of the central exhibition hall, including "NO FENCE CAN STOP HISTORY FROM MOVING FORWARD" and "WHERE ARE YOUR ANCESTORS FROM?"
- "Peaceful Protest Helmet" (2016) by James Berson: a line of colorful helmets with the inscription "PEACEFUL PROTEST HELMET" and attached recording devices with the lenses facing the viewers
- "Prison Relics from Phoenix Rising, Part 1: This Is Where I Learned of Love" (2012) by Jennifer Moon: photographic documentation of objects the artist gathered while incarcerated at the Valley State Prison for Women and accompanying text detailing her time in prison
- "James Baldwin #1-#5" (2014) by Marco Kane Braunschweiler: a short video of the author speaking about socioeconomic destruction caused by racism
- "Cut-Outs" (2015) by Ramiro Gomez: a depiction of domestic workers in California

The exhibition was accompanied by several public events at the gallery, including a panel on anti-gentrification efforts in Los Angeles, a writing seminar on the philosophical construct of citizenship, and a workshop on community organizing.

=== A Subtle Likeness (2016) & Memoirs of a Watermelon Woman (2016) ===
These two exhibitions accompanied each other at the ONE National Gay & Lesbian Archives at the University of Southern California Libraries from September through December 2016.

A Subtle Likeness featured work from four contemporary artists, Ayanah Moor, Paul Mpagi Sepuya, Anna Martine Whitehead and Kandis Williams to create a space for queer, black radical tradition. The exhibition used performance, photography, collage, video and sound installation to explore biomythography and non-traditional archiving.

Memoirs of a Watermelon Woman featured a production archive from queer filmmaker Cheryl Dunye's making of the film The Watermelon Woman in 1996. The exhibition included a full script, original audition tapes, published interviews and a photo series from the film's premiere at the 1996 Berlin International Film Festival.

=== a/wake in the water: Meditations on Disaster (2014) ===
"a/wake in the water: Meditations on Disaster" was an exhibition at the Museum of Contemporary African Diasporan Art in Brooklyn, New York from August through November 2014. The video exhibition highlighted the intersection between traumatized diaspora bodies and modern environmental disasters through the work of 12 video artists. The work was displayed in formats ranging from wall-to-wall projection to a small TV set, to "echo the sentiments of people in the midst of catastrophe," Christovale said.

== Black Radical Imagination ==
Black Radical Imagination is an international film program founded by Erin Christovale and Amir George. The artists in the group tell stories of the state of contemporary black culture by exploring afrofuturism, afrosurrealism and the magnificent.
