= 42nd Venice Biennale =

- Genre: Art exhibition
- Begins: 1986
- Ends: 1986
- Location: Venice
- Country: Italy
- Previous event: 41st Venice Biennale (1984)
- Next event: 43rd Venice Biennale (1988)

The 42nd Venice Biennale, held in 1986, was an exhibition of international contemporary art, with 40 participating nations. The Venice Biennale takes place biennially in Venice, Italy. Prizewinners of the 42nd Biennale included: Frank Auerbach and Sigmar Polke (International Prize/Golden Lion), the French pavilion with Daniel Buren (best national representation), Nunzio Di Stefano (best young artist), and Golden Lion in memory of sculptor Fausto Melotti. These were the first Biennale prizes awarded since 1968.

== Awards ==
- International Prize/Golden Lion: Frank Auerbach and Sigmar Polke
- Golden Lion for best national representation: French pavilion with Daniel Buren
- Premio 2000 (young artist): Nunzio Di Stefano
- Golden Lion in memory of sculptor Fausto Melotti

== Bibliography ==
- Di Martino, Enzo (2005). The History of the Venice Biennale 1895–2005. Venice: Papiro Arte. ISBN 978-88-901104-4-3. OCLC 62237064.
