= Topological Gardens =

2009 art exhibition

Topological Gardens was a 2009 art exhibition by Bruce Nauman at the 53rd Venice Biennale. The artist, representing the United States at the Biennale, received the festival's Golden Lion prize for best national participation.
