= Jean-Marc Bustamante =

French artist, painter, sculptor and photographer

Jean-Marc Bustamante (born 1952) is a French artist, painter, sculptor and photographer. He is a noted conceptual and installation artist and has incorporated ornamental design and architectural space in his works.

== Early life ==
Bustamante was born in Toulouse.

== Career ==
He first entered the world of art in the mid-70s, when he was employed as an assistant by the photographer William Klein.

In 1978 he began to produce huge color photographs landscapes near Barcelona. Entitled Tableaux, they looked like oil paintings with wooden frames. Penelope Curtis wrote in an exhibition catalogue of 2010: "Nothing is happening; there is no timetable, there is no narrative, other than what is in front of our eyes." Examples of these pioneering works are owned by the Metropolitan Museum of Art in New York, Barcelona Museum of Contemporary Art (MACBA) and the Centre Pompidou in Paris.

From the beginning of the 1980s, Bustamante was merging different media, producing work that straddled photography, sculpture and painting. In 1983 he met the artist Bernard Bazile and began a three-year collaboration during which the pair created conceptual works bearing the joint signature BazileBustamante.

From 1986, Bustamante worked on his own and became heavily involved in exploring the boundaries between photography and sculpture. The results were shown in a personal exhibition at the Musée d'Art Moderne de Paris in 1990 (Paysages Intérieurs). In 2010 Emma Dexter noted the importance of Bustamante's titles: "Call-ing his photographs Tableaux and his paintings Panorama suggests that Bustamante encourages a playful ambiguity and elusiveness in his practice."

In 1987 he was invited to take part in the VIII Documenta exhibition in Kassel in Germany, and again in 1992 and 1997. In 1994 the Kröller-Müller Museum and sculpture park in the Netherlands commissioned an exhibit for its pavilion designed by the modernist architect Gerrit Rietveld.

In the 1990s Bustamante experimented with a series of paintings on thick, sculptural sheets of silk-screened Plexiglas fastened to the wall with steel brackets. The results were shown at a solo exhibition at the Tate Gallery in London in 1998 (title: Something is Missing).

In 2003, he was appointed to represent France at the 50th Venice Biennale. He exhibited a huge sculpture at the center of the French pavilion and some large photographic portraits resembling traditional painted portraits.

In 2006, the museum director Eckhard Schneider organized a solo exhibition entitled Beautifuldays at the Kunsthaus Bregenz in Austria. Bustamante's works occupied the four floors of the museum and a lighting installation highlighted the external structure of the building.

In 2007, he jointly exhibited with the American artist Ed Ruscha at the Strasbourg Museum of Modern and Contemporary Art.

In 2011, he had a solo exhibition in Villa Medici in Rome curated by Éric de Chassey, and presented an extensive show of his work entitled Dead Calm, both at the Fruitmarket Gallery in Edinburgh and at the same time at the Henry Moore Institute in Leeds. In the catalogue Emma Dexter wrote: "Bustamante's approach seeks to ex-plore the gaps, ambiguities and correspondences between media, testing the thinness or robustness of the delineation of each medium, aiming always at their redefinition and reinvention."

In September 2015, he was appointed director of the École des Beaux-Arts in Paris.

On 7 December 2016, Bustamante was elected member of the Académie des Beaux-Arts in Paris, taking the place of the painter Zao Wou-Ki (1920–2013).

== Teaching ==
From 1990 to 1995 Bustamante taught in the Rijksakademie van Beeldende Kunsten in Amsterdam.

From 1996 taught at the École nationale supérieure des Beaux-Arts in Paris.

From 2009 to 2015 he was head of the painting class at the Akademie der Bildenden Künste in Munich.

== Galleries ==
Bustamante is represented by: Galerie Bärbel Grässlin and Galerie Thaddaeus Ropac.

== Personal life ==
Bustamante has three daughters.

== Collections ==
Bustamante's work is held in the following permanent collections:

- Fonds régional d'art contemporain (FRAC), France
- Centre Pompidou - Musée d´Art Contemporain, Paris
- Musée d'Art moderne de Saint-Etienne, Saint-Etienne, France
- Huis Marseille stichting voor fotografie, Amsterdam, Netherlands
- Museu d´Art Contemporani de Barcelona - MACBA, Barcelona, Spain
- Museo Nacional Centro de Arte Reina Sofía MNCARS, Madrid, Spain
- Migros Museum für Gegenwartskunst, Zurich, Switzerland
- Tate Britain, London
- The Metropolitan Museum of Art, New York City

== General references ==
- Union List of Artists Names, s.v. "Bustamante, Jean-Marc", cited 7 February 2006
- (in French) Jean-Marc Bustamante
