= Elsa Longhauser =

American museum director

- Citizenship: American
- Education: Antioch College, University of Pennsylvania
- Occupation: Museum director
- Employer(s): Institute of Contemporary Art, Los Angeles (ICA LA)
- Organization: Santa Monica Museum of Art
- Spouses: Norman Weiner, William Longhauser

Elsa Longhauser is the founding executive director of the Institute of Contemporary Art, Los Angeles (ICA LA), California, United States, formerly the Santa Monica Museum of Art (SMMoA), where Longhauser served as director from 2000 until the museum ended operations in Bergamot Station in 2015. From 1983 until 2000, Longhauser served as director of the gallery at the Moore College of Art and Design in Philadelphia, Pennsylvania.

== Early life and education ==
Longhauser is from Philadelphia, Pennsylvania. She attended Antioch College as a young woman. She married and had three children before completing her bachelor's degree in art history in 1971, from the University of Pennsylvania.

== Career ==
Longhauser was director of several galleries in Philadelphia early in her career. She organized an "important show" of outsider art at the Philadelphia College of Art in 1981. In 1993, Longhauser continued her interest in the genre when she organized a touring show of Terry Fox's work. In 1998, she was guest co-curator with Harald Szeemann at the Museum of American Folk Art for a "major traveling show" of works by self-taught American artists.

Elsa Longhauser became gallery director at Moore College of Art and Design in 1983; during her tenure there, she was called an "unsung hero of the local cultural scene". In 2000, Longhauser left Philadelphia and became director of the Santa Monica Museum of Art.

Founded in 1984 as the Santa Monica Museum of Art (SMMoA) and reestablished in 2017 with a new identity and home in Downtown Los Angeles, ICA LA builds upon a history of curatorial experience and innovative programming to bring more attention upon untold stories and emerging voices in contemporary art and culture. The museum's 12,700 square-foot renovated industrial building—designed by wHY Architecture under the leadership of Kulapat Yantrasast—features ample space for exhibitions, public programs, retail pop-ups, integrated offices, and special projects.

== Personal life ==
Longhauser married Norman B. Weiner, a doctor, as her first husband; he died in 1977. She remarried in 1983, to William Longhauser, a graphic artist and college professor.
