= 37th Venice Biennale =

1976 contemporary art exhibition

- Genre: Art exhibition
- Begins: 1976
- Ends: 1976
- Location: Venice
- Country: Italy
- Previous event: 36th Venice Biennale (1972)
- Next event: 38th Venice Biennale (1978)

The 37th Venice Biennale, held in 1976, was an exhibition of international contemporary art, with 30 participating nations. The Venice Biennale takes place biennially in Venice, Italy. No prizes were awarded this year or in any Biennale between 1968 and 1986.

== Bibliography ==
- Di Martino, Enzo (2005). The History of the Venice Biennale 1895–2005. Venice: Papiro Arte. ISBN 978-88-901104-4-3. OCLC 62237064.
