= Joseph Pollet =

American artist (1897–1979)

Joseph C. Pollet
- Born: 1897; Allbbruck, Germany
- Died: 1979 (aged 81–82); New York City
- Known for: Painter

Joseph C. Pollet (1897–1979) was an American painter, based in New York City and the region. He was best known for his portraits and realistic rural landscapes.

== Biography ==
Pollet was born in 1897 in Albbruck, Germany and immigrated in 1911 as a youth with his parents to New York City. He studied at the Art Students League of New York under artist John Sloan.

By age 21 Pollet was employed as an advertising copywriter, while studying painting. He settled near Woodstock, New York. He received early notice for his portraits and landscapes. In the 1940s, he was described as pursuing a variety of techniques and evading characterization of style.

He retained ties in Woodstock during the several years, from 1954 until 1961, when he lived in Paris and Italy. After Pollet returned to the United States and New York, he lived in Greenwich Village in Manhattan.

Pollet was best known for his realistic rural landscapes. In 1971, a fire in his Greenwich Village studio destroyed nearly 150 of his paintings.

== Marriage and family ==
Pollet married twice. He and his first wife had two children together, two daughters named Elizabeth and Barbara. He and his second wife had a son, Sylvester.
