= 38th Venice Biennale =

- Genre: Art exhibition
- Begins: 1978
- Ends: 1978
- Location: Venice
- Country: Italy
- Previous event: 37th Venice Biennale (1976)
- Next event: 39th Venice Biennale (1980)

The 38th Venice Biennale, held in 1978, was an exhibition of international contemporary art, with 26 participating nations. The Venice Biennale takes place biennially in Venice, Italy. No prizes were awarded this year or in any Biennale between 1968 and 1986.

== Bibliography ==
- Di Martino, Enzo (2005). The History of the Venice Biennale 1895–2005. Venice: Papiro Arte. ISBN 978-88-901104-4-3. OCLC 62237064.
