= 33rd Venice Biennale =

- Genre: Art exhibition
- Begins: 1966
- Ends: 1966
- Location: Venice
- Country: Italy
- Previous event: 32nd Venice Biennale (1964)
- Next event: 34th Venice Biennale (1968)

The 33rd Venice Biennale, held in 1966, was an exhibition of international contemporary art, with 36 participating nations. The Venice Biennale takes place biennially in Venice, Italy. Winners of the Gran Premi (Grand Prize) included Argentine painter Julio Le Parc, Danish sculptor Robert Jacobsen ex aequo with Étienne Martin (France), Japanese etcher Masuo Ikeda, and Italians painter Lucio Fontana, sculptor Alberto Viani, and etcher Ezio Gribaudo.

== Bibliography ==
- Di Martino, Enzo (2005). The History of the Venice Biennale 1895–2005. Venice: Papiro Arte. ISBN 978-88-901104-4-3. OCLC 62237064.
