= French pavilion =

Building at Venice Biennale for French art

Coordinates: 45.4281°N 12.3588°E

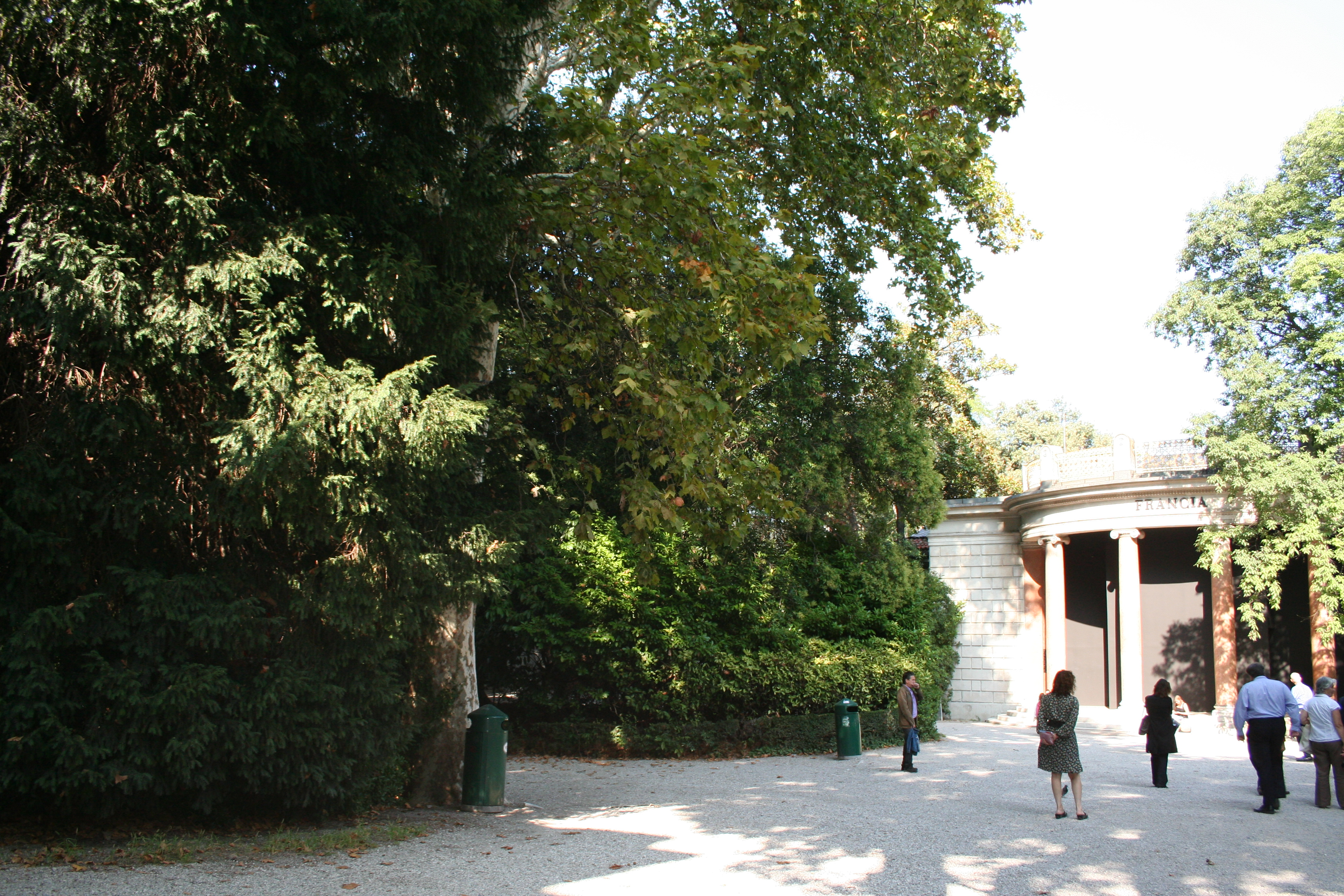
Giardini pavilion (France) at the 53rd Venice Biennale

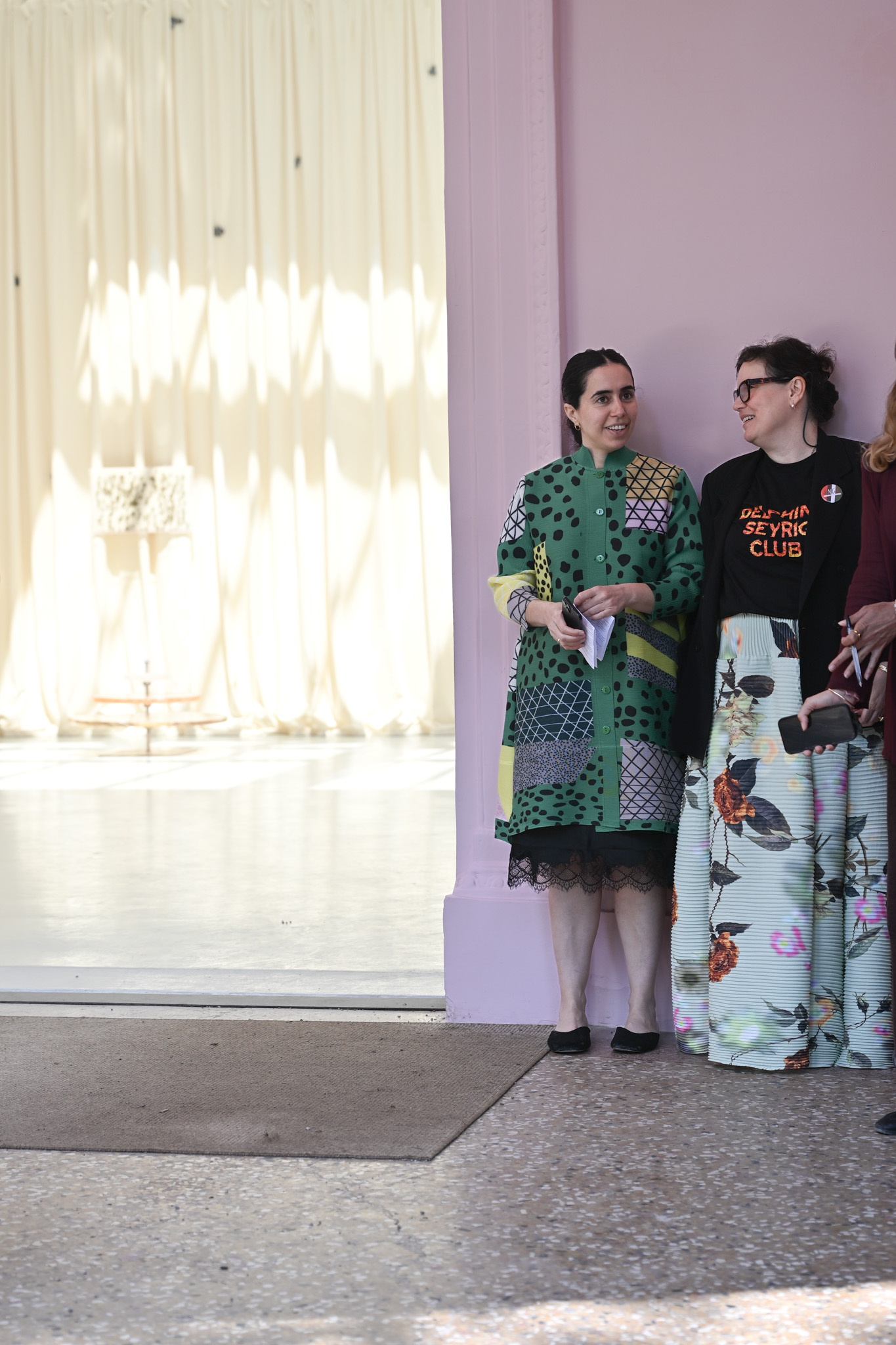
Myriam Ben Salah and Yto Barrada at the Biennale di Venezia 2026

The French pavilion houses France's national representation during the Venice Biennale arts festivals.

== Background ==
The Venice Biennale is an international art biennial exhibition held in Venice, Italy. Often described as "the Olympics of the art world", participation in the Biennale is a prestigious event for contemporary artists. The festival has become a constellation of shows: a central exhibition curated by that year's artistic director, national pavilions hosted by individual nations, and independent exhibitions held throughout Venice. The Biennale's parent organisation also runs regular festivals in other arts: architecture, dance, film, music and theatre.

Outside the central international exhibition, individual nations produce their own shows, known as pavilions, as their national representation. Nations that own their pavilion buildings – such as the 30 housed in the Giardini – are responsible for their own upkeep and construction costs as well. Nations without dedicated buildings create pavilions in venues throughout the city.

== Organisation and building ==
The pavilion was built in 1912 and designed by architect Faust Finzi, chief engineer for the Venice municipality. Its layout and details are similar to that of the German pavilion, whose architect was Finzi's former boss.

== Representation by year ==
=== Art ===
- 1962 — Alfred Manessier, Jean Messagier, Serge Poliakoff, André Marfaing, James Guitet
- 1976 — Herve Fisher, Fred Forest, Raymond Hains, Alain Jacquet, Bertrand Lavier, Jean-Pierre Raynaud, Jean-Michel Sanejouand, Jean-Paul Thenot (Commissioner: Pierre Restany)
- 1982 — Simon Hantaï
- 1984 — Jean Dubuffet
- 1986 — Daniel Buren
- 1991 — Jean Nouvel, Christian de Portzamparc, Philippe Starck
- 1993 — Jean-Pierre Raynaud
- 1995 — César
- 1997 — Fabrice Hybert
- 1999 — Huang Yong Ping, Jean-Pierre Bertrand
- 2001 — Pierre Huyghe
- 2003 — Jean-Marc Bustamante (Curators: Jean-Pierre Criqui, Alfred Pacquement)
- 2005 — Annette Messager (Curator: Caroline Ferreira)
- 2007 — Sophie Calle (Curator: Daniel Buren)
- 2009 — Claude Lévêque (Curator: Christian Bernard)
- 2011 — Christian Boltanski (Curator: Jean-Hubert Martin)
- 2013 — Anri Sala (Curator: Christine Macel) [Exhibition was held at the German pavilion]
- 2015 — Céleste Boursier-Mougenot, Lili Reynaud-Dewar (Curator: Emma Lavigne)
- 2017 — Xavier Veilhan (Curators: Lionel Bovier, Christian Marclay)
- 2019 — Laure Prouvost (Curator: Martha Kirszenbaum)
- 2021 — Zineb Sedira
- 2024 — Julien Creuzet
- 2026 — Yto Barrada (Curator: Myriam Ben Salah)

== Bibliography ==
- Russeth, Andrew (April 17, 2019). "The Venice Biennale: Everything You Could Ever Want to Know". ARTnews.
- Volpi, Cristiana (2013). "France". In Re Rebaudengo, Adele (ed.). Pavilions and Garden of Venice Biennale. Rome: Contrasto. p. 169. ISBN 978-88-6965-440-4.
