= Charles Garabedian =

American painter (1923–2016)

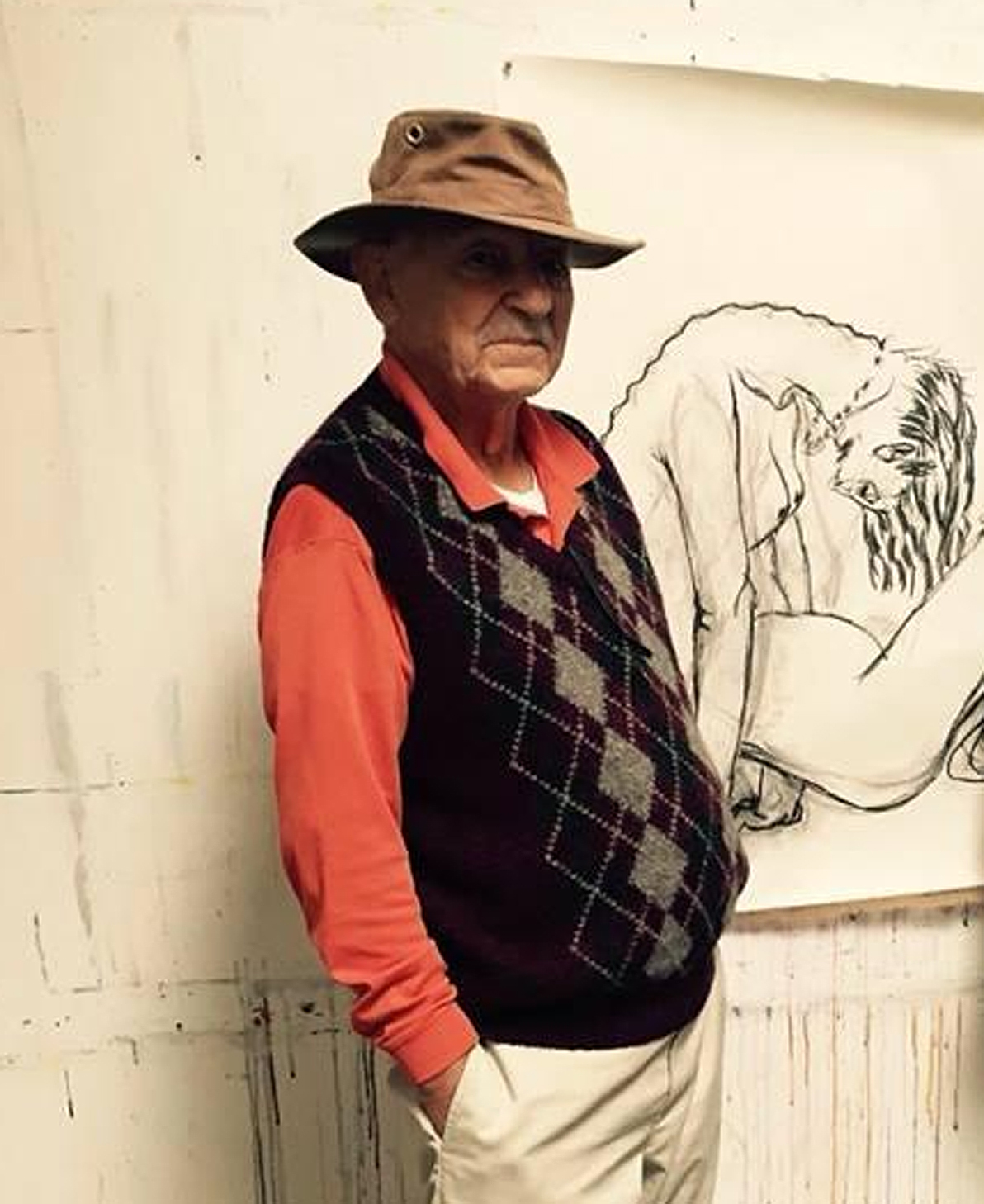
- Garabedian in his studio, 2016
- Born: December 29, 1923; Detroit, Michigan, U.S.
- Died: February 11, 2016 (aged 92); Santa Monica, California, U.S.
- Education: University of California, Santa Barbara; University of Southern California, University of California, Los Angeles
- Known for: Painter
- Military career
- Allegiance: United States
- Branch: United States Army Air Forces
- Service years: 1942–1945
- Rank: Staff Sergeant

Charles Garabedian (Armenian: Չարլզ Կարապետյան, December 29, 1923 – February 11, 2016) was an American-Armenian artist known for his paintings and drawings rich in references to Greek and Chinese symbolism. His artwork reveals a deeply personal world that explores the relationship between painting and sculpture.

== Biography ==
Man Tearing his Heart Out, oil on linen painting by Charles Garabedian, Honolulu Museum of Art

Garabedian was born in Detroit, Michigan, to Armenian immigrants who had come to the U.S. to escape the Armenian genocide. Garabedian's mother died when he was two and his father was unable to take care of the three children. Garabedian lived in an orphanage until age nine, when he, his father, and siblings moved to Los Angeles, California.

From 1942 to 1945, Garabedian served as a staff sergeant in the United States Air Force and was an aerial gunner in the European theater during World War II. Under the auspices of the G.I. Bill, Garabedian studied literature at the University of California, Santa Barbara from 1947 to 1948. He then went on to the University of Southern California in Los Angeles, where he earned a bachelor's degree in history in 1950. He received his master's degree in 1961 at the University of California Los Angeles. He did not, however, become an artist until later in his life.

When in his forties, Garabedian began to explore the relationships between painting and drawing. His fascination with China is reflected in many of his pieces incorporating dragons and ornate grillwork and pattern. Although his most prolific period was in the late 1960s, later in his life he still continued to paint. The first solo exhibition of his work was held at the Ceeje gallery in Los Angeles (1963) and subsequent one man shows followed at the Fine Arts Gallery at California State University, Northridge (1974), and The Whitney Museum of American Art, New York City (1976). His group exhibitions include the Whitney Museum of American Art Biennial Exhibition: Contemporary American Art, New York (1975) and others. In 1979, he was a recipient of a Guggenheim Fellowship for Fine Arts. In 2011, the Santa Barbara Museum of Art hosted a retrospective of Garabedian's work. He died on February 11, 2016, at the age of 92.
