= 41st Venice Biennale =

- Genre: Art exhibition
- Begins: 1984
- Ends: 1984
- Location: Venice
- Country: Italy
- Previous event: 40th Venice Biennale (1982)
- Next event: 42nd Venice Biennale (1986)

The 41st Venice Biennale, held in 1984, was an exhibition of international contemporary art, with 33 participating nations. The Venice Biennale takes place biennially in Venice, Italy. No prizes were awarded this year or in any Biennale between 1968 and 1986.

== Bibliography ==
- Di Martino, Enzo (2005). The History of the Venice Biennale 1895–2005. Venice: Papiro Arte. ISBN 978-88-901104-4-3. OCLC 62237064.
