= Sovereignty (art exhibition) =

Art exhibition in Venice, Italy

Sovereignty is an art exhibition at the 2022 Venice Biennale's American pavilion featuring works by American sculptor Simone Leigh.
