= 43rd Venice Biennale =

- Genre: Art exhibition
- Begins: 1988
- Ends: 1988
- Location: Venice
- Country: Italy
- Previous event: 42nd Venice Biennale (1986)
- Next event: 44th Venice Biennale (1990)

The 43rd Venice Biennale, held in 1988, was an exhibition of international contemporary art, with 44 participating nations. The Venice Biennale takes place biennially in Venice, Italy. Prizewinners of the 43rd Biennale included: Jasper Johns (International Prize/Golden Lion), the Italian pavilion (best national participation), and Barbara Bloom (best young artist).

== Awards ==
- International Prize/Golden Lion: Jasper Johns
- Golden Lion for best national participation: Italian pavilion
- Premio 2000 (young artist): Barbara Bloom

== Bibliography ==
- Di Martino, Enzo (2005). The History of the Venice Biennale 1895–2005. Venice: Papiro Arte. ISBN 978-88-901104-4-3. OCLC 62237064.
