= 34th Venice Biennale =

- Genre: Art exhibition
- Begins: 1968
- Ends: 1968
- Location: Venice
- Country: Italy
- Previous event: 33rd Venice Biennale (1966)
- Next event: 35th Venice Biennale (1970)

The 34th Venice Biennale, held in 1968, was an exhibition of international contemporary art, with 34 participating nations. It took place in Venice, Italy. Winners of the Golden Lions Awards (Grand Prizes) included British painter Bridget Riley, French sculptor Nicolas Schöffer, German etcher Horst Janssen, and Italian sculptors Gianni Colombo and Pino Pascali. The opening days of the Biennale were marred by hard encounters between students protesting and the local police, which resulted in some of the artists refusing to show their work in solidarity.

== Bibliography ==
- Di Martino, Enzo (2005). The History of the Venice Biennale 1895–2005. Venice: Papiro Arte. ISBN 978-88-901104-4-3. OCLC 62237064.
