= 32nd Venice Biennale =

1964 art exhibition in Venice

- Genre: Art exhibition
- Begins: 1964
- Ends: 1964
- Location: Venice
- Country: Italy
- Previous event: 31st Venice Biennale (1962)
- Next event: 33rd Venice Biennale (1966)

The 32nd Venice Biennale, held in 1964, was an exhibition of international contemporary art, with 34 participating nations. The Venice Biennale takes place biennially in Venice, Italy. Winners of the Gran Premi (Grand Prize) included American painter Robert Rauschenberg, Swiss sculptor Zoltán Kemény, German draughtsman Joseph Fassbender, and Italian sculptors Andrea Cascella, sculptor Arnaldo Pomodoro, and etcher Angelo Savelli.

Rauschenberg's selection for the Grand Prize marked the United States' ascendancy over European artistic dominance, and the entrance of pop art into canon.

== Bibliography ==
- Di Martino, Enzo (2005). The History of the Venice Biennale 1895–2005. Venice: Papiro Arte. ISBN 978-88-901104-4-3. OCLC 62237064.
