= The Space in Which to Place Me =

2024 art exhibition by Jeffrey Gibson in Venice, Italy

The Space in Which to Place Me (stylized in lower case) is an art exhibition at the 2024 Venice Biennale's American pavilion featuring works by painter and sculptor Jeffrey Gibson.
