= 53rd Venice Biennale =

2009 edition of the art exhibition

- Genre: Art exhibition
- Begins: 2009
- Ends: 2009
- Location: Venice
- Country: Italy
- Previous event: 52nd Venice Biennale (2007)
- Next event: 54th Venice Biennale (2011)

The 53rd Venice Biennale was an international contemporary art exhibition held in 2009. The Venice Biennale takes place biennially in Venice, Italy. Artistic director Daniel Birnbaum curated its central exhibition, "Making Worlds".

== Awards ==
- Golden Lion for best artist of the exhibition: Tobias Rehberger
- Silver Lion for the most promising young artist of the exhibition: Nathalie Djurberg
- Golden Lions for lifetime achievement: Yoko Ono and John Baldessari
- Golden Lion for best national participation: American pavilion with Bruce Nauman (Topological Gardens)
