= Jeffrey Gibson =

Native American painter and sculptor from New York, U.S.

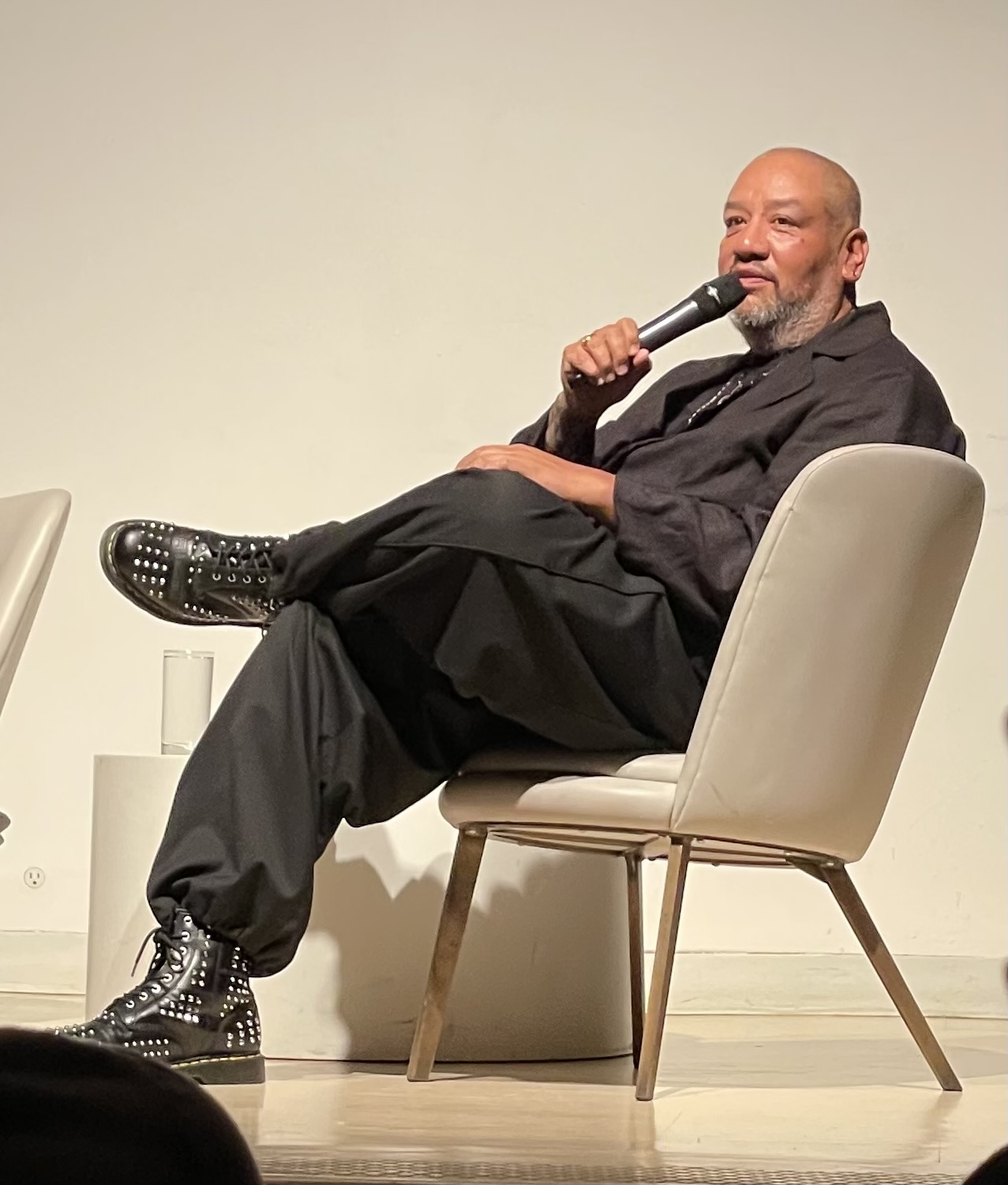
- Gibson speaking at the Hirshhorn Museum in 2024
- Born: March 31, 1972 (age 54); Colorado Springs, Colorado, U.S.
- Citizenship: Mississippi Choctaw and United States
- Education: School of the Art Institute of Chicago, Royal College of Art
- Known for: Painting, sculpture
- Spouse: Rune Olsen
- Website: jeffreygibson.net

Jeffrey A. Gibson (born 1972) is an American Mississippi Choctaw/Cherokee painter and sculptor. He has lived and worked in Brooklyn, New York; Hudson, New York; and Germantown, New York.

In 2024, Gibson represented the United States at the Venice Biennale, where he is the first Indigenous artist to have a solo exhibition in the American pavilion.

== Early life and education ==
Jeffrey A. Gibson was born on March 31, 1972, in Colorado Springs, Colorado. His mother is Georgia Wilson Gibson (Cherokee Nation). His father was a citizen of the Mississippi Band of Choctaw Indians, as was his paternal grandfather Homer Gibson, from Conehatta, Mississippi. His parents came from a background of poverty and both attended boarding schools where the Native American children were often abused. As a child, he lived in North Carolina, New Jersey, West Germany, and South Korea, moving frequently because his father worked as a civil engineer for the United States Department of Defense.

Gibson earned his Bachelor of Fine Arts degree in 1995 from the School of the Art Institute of Chicago. In 1998 he received his Master of Fine Arts from the Royal College of Art in London, where he focused on painting. His graduate education was sponsored by the Mississippi Band of Choctaw Indians. Gibson remarked on this opportunity provided for him: "My community has supported me ... My chief felt that me going there, being a strong artist, made him stronger."

Gibson has identified as queer and gay. He is married to Norwegian artist Rune Olsen, and together they have a daughter and son.

== Career ==
"Utopia was important for me to envision and relates to my being Native American and having grown up solely in a Western consumer culture. My desire to act out the role of an explorer depicting an inviting landscape, via painting and specimen retrieval, was a reaction to Native tribes' being consistently described as part of a nostalgic and romantic vision of pre-colonized Indian life. The aesthetic of these paintings and sculptures came from turn-of-the-century Iroquois whimsies, contemporary and historic powwow regalia, cultural adornment of non-Western cultures, techno rave and club culture, and earlier utopian models."

— Jeffrey Gibson

Gibson is an artist in residence at Bard College, where he also teaches in studio art courses. In 2010 he was a visiting artist at the California College of the Arts.

In order to keep regular studio hours, Gibson prefers to work between the hours of 10 am and 6 pm. His computer, cell phone, and a movie are generally at his reach if a break is needed while working. Music usually plays in the background, sometimes random, sometimes a specific record with genres ranging from African funk, jazz, punk, pop music, rap, R&B, disco, as well as East Indian drumming.

Gibson's art deals with issues of identity and labels. His work has featured the use of mixed media including Native American beadwork, trading post blankets, metal studs, fringe, and jingles. Airbrushing is another common tool used in his paintings, sculptures, and prints, incorporating oil paint and spray paint to create neon colored abstracts such as Singular (2008) and Submerge (2007). These works also find inspiration in graffiti, reflective of Gibson's urban life in New York City. Gibson is represented by Roberts Projects in Los Angeles, Sikkema Jenkins & Co. in New York, and Stephen Friedman Gallery in London.

In 2024, Gibson represented the United States in the Venice Biennale with a solo survey exhibition in the United States Pavilion, titled The Space in Which to Place Me. The title of the show is from a line in a poem by Layli Long Soldier. The work referenced politics in relation to Indigenous and a range of American histories. Artworks included paintings, sculpture, flags, video and beadwork rendered in psychedelic colors. The New York Times describes his work as having "political valences" and also "many layers of form and meaning."

He is the first Indigenous artist to represent the United States with a full pavilion show at the Venice Biennale. The show and related artworks were re-exhibited in 2025 at the Broad in Los Angeles.

== Influences ==
Gibson draws influence in materials, processes, media, and iconographies. He has found inspiration in events that revolve around dancing, specifically from Leigh Bowery and his dramatic nightclub persona. Pow-wows, nightclubs, and raves provide contrasts as rural and urban venues, serving as spaces for dancing, movement, and dramatic fashion/regalia. Keeping with regalia, 19th-century Iroquois beadwork also provides inspiration, as colorful beads often find their way into Gibson's artworks. Gibson also provides his own spin on graffiti, which is seen frequently in his works.

He also credits his nomadic lifestyle as a major influence, bringing together what he describes as:

... varying aesthetics of each place. Some have had specific cultural aesthetics, language barriers, cultural barriers, etcetera. These differences funnel through me, a queer Native male born toward the end of the 20th century and entering the 21st century. I consider this hybrid in the construction of my work and attempt to show that complexity.

== Artworks ==
Watchtower, A Little Bit Louder, and WITHOUT YOU I'M NOTHING (2018), Smithsonian American Art Museum

=== Rawhide painting series ===
Gibson's practice has involved painting in oil and acrylic on rawhide-clad wood panels. He is recycling found objects such as antique shaving mirrors and ironing boards and covers them in untanned deer, goat, or elk skin. Gibson combines domestic, Native American, and Hard-edge modernist references. His punching bag made from found Everlast punching bags, U.S. Army wool blankets, glass beads, tin jingles, and the artist's repurposed paintings exemplify the dialogue between mainstream pop culture and Native American powwow aesthetics.

His work Document, 2015 (2015) is made with acrylic and graphite on deer rawhide, hung with steel spikes. Under Cover (2015) was a made with rawhide stretched over wood panel.

=== "Atmospheric landscapes" ===
Before that Gibson's most notable works, his at times 3-D wall abstracts, have been described as "atmospheric landscapes". Working in oil paint he also brings together objects that have become a signature to his works: pigmented silicon, urethane foam, and beads.

=== Alive (2017) ===
Alive showed as part of the Desert x exhibition in the Coachella Valley from February 25 to April 30, 2017.

=== Totems series ===
Creating his own totem sculptures, in 2009 Gibson produced the Totems series for an exhibition at Sala Diaz in San Antonio, Texas. This series of sculptures involved Gibson arriving five days before the opening to put together a collection of found objects to create what have been described, by the artist, as "fantasy sex partners, objects of desire".

The Totems feature objects such as mannequins acquired from Craigslist, a wig, plastic flowers, toys, cowboy boots, flower pots, his signature spray paint and other objects. In the end Gibson created two human-like figures and a totem pole from the flower pots. Writer Ben Judson described Totems as way Gibson "uses the stereotyping of his own people as a way of exploring the use of metaphor in identity formation, cultural critique and consumerism without forfeiting lyricism or indulging in self-righteousness (apart, that is, from his press release)."

=== The Animal That Therefore I Am (2025) ===
From September 12, 2025 to June 9, 2026, Gibson's The Animal That Therefore I Am was the Genesis Facade Commission at the Metropolitan Museum of Art. The work consists of four large sculptures that reference a deer, coyote, squirrel and hawk. The new sculptural works are said to be inspired by Jacques Derrida, an Algerian-born French philosopher.

=== Yet With a Steady Beat (2026) ===
On April 9, 2026, the Obama Foundation announced that it had commissioned Gibson to create a work for the Obama Presidential Center. Gibson’s work "is a wall installation featuring 17 circular prints that reference Gibson’s use of political buttons and drums, which are recurring elements in his interdisciplinary practice."

== Reception ==
Gibson's abstract works have been compared to artists such as Martin Johnson Heade, Cy Twombly, Chris Ofili, and Indigenous Australian art. While some celebrate him as a Native artist, others celebrate his ability to move freely in and out of Native and non-Native contemporary art worlds.

== Notable collections ==
- Crystal Bridges Museum
- Denver Art Museum
- Eiteljorg Museum of American Indians and Western Art
- Hood Museum
- Metropolitan Museum of Art
- Mississippi Museum of Art
- Museum of Fine Arts, Boston
- Nasher Museum of Art
- Nerman Museum of Contemporary Art
- Philbrook Museum of Art
- Smithsonian Institution, National Museum of the American Indian
- School for Advanced Research
- Speed Art Museum
- Whitney Museum of American Art

== Notable exhibitions ==
- Jefferey Gibson: A Real Love Thing, 2026, Irene and Richard Frary Gallery, Johns Hopkins University Bloomberg Center, Washington, D.C.
- Jefferey Gibson: POWER FULL BECAUSE WE'RE DIFFERENT, 2024, Massachusetts Museum of Contemporary Art, North Adams, Massachusetts
- Jeffrey Gibson: The Body Electric, 2023, Frist Art Museum, Nashville, Tennessee
- This Burning World, 2022, solo exhibition, Institute of Contemporary Art San Francisco, San Francisco, California
- Stretching the Canvas: Eight Decades of Native Painting (2019–2021), National Museum of the American Indian George Gustav Heye Center, New York, New York
- Jeffrey Gibson: This Is the Day, 2018–19, Ruth and Elmer Wellin Museum of Art at Hamilton College, Clinton, New York, Blanton Museum of Art, Austin, Texas
- Jeffrey Gibson: Like A Hammer, 2018–19, Denver Art Museum, Denver, CO, Mississippi Museum of Art, Jackson, MS, Seattle Art Museum, Seattle, WA, Madison Museum of Contemporary Art, Madison, WI
- Sakahan, 2013, National Gallery of Canada, Ottawa, Ontario
- Said The Pigeon to the Squirrel, 2013, National Academy Museum and School, New York, NY
- Love Song, 2013, Institute of Contemporary Art, Boston, MA
- Tipi Poles Performing As Lines, 2013, Cornell Fine Arts Museum, Winter Park, FL
- Marc Straus, 2012, New York, NY
- Shapeshifting, 2012, Peabody Essex Museum, Salem, MA
- Changing Hands 3, 2012, Museum of Arts and Design, New York, NY
- Recent Acquisitions, 2011, Denver Art Museum, Denver, CO
- Recent Acquisitions, 2011, Museum of Fine Arts, Boston, Boston, MA
- Collision, 2010, Rhode Island School of Design, Providence, RI
- Vantage Point, 2010, National Museum of the American Indian, Washington, DC
- Flushing Town Hall Projects, 2008, Flushing Town Hall, New York, NY
- Group show, 2008, Kentler International Drawing Space, Brooklyn, NY
- Voices From the Mound, 2008, IAIA Museum of Contemporary Arts, Santa Fe, NM
- Group show, 2007, New England School of Art and Design, Boston, MA
- Off the Map, 2007, National Museum of the American Indian, New York, NY
- SONOTUBE, 2007, Santa Barbara Contemporary Arts, Santa Barbara, CA
- BROOKLYN, 2006, Westport Arts Center, Westport, CT
- No Reservations, 2006, Aldrich Contemporary Art Museum, Ridgefield, CT
- Paumanok-a, 2006, Stony Brook University, Stony Brook, NY
- Tropicalisms, 2006, Jersey City Museum, Jersey City, NJ
- Indigenous Anomaly, 2005, American Indian Community House, New York, NY
- (re)positions, 2001, Bronx Museum of the Arts, New York, NY

Gibson has also exhibited at numerous events such as the New Art Dealers Alliance Fair, ARCOmadrid, as well as many private galleries and public institutions.

== Notable awards and grants ==
- Frederic Church Award, 2026
- MacArthur Fellowship, 2019
- Joan Mitchell Foundation Painters and Sculptors Grant, 2012
- TED (conference) Foundation Fellow, 2012
- Smithsonian Institution Contemporary Arts Grant, 2012
- Jerome Hill Foundation, 2012
- Eiteljorg Museum Fellowship for Native American Fine Art, 2009, Eiteljorg Museum of American Indians and Western Art
- Ronald & Susan Dubin Fellowship, 2008, School for Advanced Research
- Creative Capital Award, 2005

== Kavi Gupta Gallery lawsuit ==
In May 2023, Gibson filed a lawsuit against the Kavi Gupta gallery in United States District Court for the Northern District of New York, alleging that the gallery has withheld over $600,000 from the artist. On 27 February 2025 the Gibson and the Gallery settled their dispute confidentially.
