= Michael R. Taylor (art historian) =

American art historian

Academic background
- Education: University of Edinburgh (MA); Courtauld Institute of Art, London (MA); Courtauld Institute of Art, London (PhD)

Michael R. Taylor is a curator, author, and expert in modern and contemporary art with a focus on Dada, Surrealism, and the work of Marcel Duchamp. With a Ph.D in Art History from the Courtauld Institute of Art in London, he was a Curator of Modern Art at the Philadelphia Museum of Art from 1997 until 2011, and Director of the Hood Museum of Art at Dartmouth College in Hanover, New Hampshire from 2011 until 2015 In May 2015, the Virginia Museum of Fine Arts announced its appointment of Dr. Taylor as Chief Curator and Deputy Director for Art and Education.

== Selected bibliography ==
- Marcel Duchamp: Étant donnés, New Haven: Yale University Press, in association with the Philadelphia Museum of Art, 2009.
- Arshile Gorky: A Retrospective, New Haven: Yale University Press, in association with the Philadelphia Museum of Art, 2009.
- Thomas Chimes: Adventures in 'Pataphysics', Philadelphia: Philadelphia Museum of Art, 2007.
- Co-Author (with Dawn Adès), Salvador Dalí: The Centennial Retrospective, Milan: Bompiani, and New York: Rizzoli, 2004.
- Jacques Lipchitz and Philadelphia, Philadelphia: Philadelphia Museum of Art, Museum Bulletin series, 2004.
- Giorgio de Chirico and the Myth of Ariadne, Philadelphia: Philadelphia Museum of Art, and London: Merrell Publishers, 2002.
- Co-author (with Ann Temkin and Susan Rosenberg), Twentieth Century Painting and Sculpture in the Philadelphia Museum of Art, Philadelphia: Philadelphia Museum of Art, 2000.
