= 35th Venice Biennale =

- Genre: Art exhibition
- Begins: 1970
- Ends: 1970
- Location: Venice
- Country: Italy
- Previous event: 34th Venice Biennale (1968)
- Next event: 36th Venice Biennale (1972)

The 35th Venice Biennale, held in 1970, was an exhibition of international contemporary art, with 28 participating nations. The Venice Biennale takes place biennially in Venice, Italy. No prizes were awarded this year or in any Biennale between 1968 and 1986.

== Bibliography ==
- Di Martino, Enzo (2005). The History of the Venice Biennale 1895–2005. Venice: Papiro Arte. ISBN 978-88-901104-4-3. OCLC 62237064.
