= 39th Venice Biennale =

- Genre: Art exhibition
- Begins: 1980
- Ends: 1980
- Location: Venice
- Country: Italy
- Previous event: 38th Venice Biennale (1978)
- Next event: 40th Venice Biennale (1982)

The 39th Venice Biennale, held in 1980, was an exhibition of international contemporary art, with 33 participating nations. The Venice Biennale takes place biennially in Venice, Italy. No prizes were awarded this year or in any Biennale between 1968 and 1986.

== Bibliography ==
- Di Martino, Enzo (2005). The History of the Venice Biennale 1895–2005. Venice: Papiro Arte. ISBN 978-88-901104-4-3. OCLC 62237064.
