= Barbara Bloom (artist) =

American artist

- Born: 1951 (age 74–75); Los Angeles, California, US
- Education: Bennington College (BFA); California Institute of the Arts 1972

Barbara Bloom (born 1951) lives and works in New York City. She is a conceptual artist best known for her multi-media installation works. Bloom is loosely affiliated with a group of artists referred to as The Pictures Generation. For nearly twenty years she lived in Europe, first in Amsterdam then Berlin. Since 1992, she has lived in New York City with her husband, the writer-composer Chris Mann, and their daughter.

== Education ==
Bloom attended Bennington College in Bennington, Vermont, from 1968 to 1969, and in 1972 received her BFA from the California Institute of the Arts in Valencia, California where her mentor was John Baldessari.

== Work ==
Bloom is a visual artist whose conceptual practice relies mainly on photography and installation. Beginning in the 1970s, Bloom has created work in a variety of different mediums including photography, installation, film, and books.

In conversation with Susan Tallman, Barbara Bloom has referred to herself as a “novelist who somehow ended up in a ‘visual artist’ queue”. Bloom has often compared herself, and the viewer of her work, to a 'detective' who is confronted with disparate clues and is asked to form some kind of visual narrative. Her work is often about the nature of looking. She engages her viewer, seducing him/her into a beautifully constructed visual world, one that is underlaid by subversive wrenches thrown in.

Bloom has an ongoing interest in the value and meaning we collectively and individually bestow upon objects and images. She has not been concerned with showing single objects or images, rather with highlighting the relationships between them, and the meanings implicit in their placement and combination. The objects are placeholders for thoughts, and when they are situated in proximity to one another, meanings can reverberate and ricochet off of each other. Additionally, Bloom states in an artist's statement that her

"fascination is with the relationships between objects or images—and the meanings implicit in their placement and combination."

Bloom's use of shadows, traces, Braille, broken objects, partially-obstructed images, watermarks, and micro-images demonstrate an interest in visualizing the fragile workings of the invisible, the ephemeral, and the absent. These “aesthetic underdogs, sheltered under Bloom’s wing provide yet another lens for looking at how we seek value in objects and why.”

“During the last year, I produced and exhibited a work titled The Weather... In this work, hovering in varying heights above the floor are carpets, each a subtle shade of gray-green-blue. The carpets have raised-dot patterns forming texts in Braille... The production of the carpets was a complex one, and it was not easy to find a manufacturer able to accurately produce the intricate patterns of raised dots. Working with Classic Rug Collections in New York, a factory in Thailand was found that could produce the work perfectly. ” (Bloom on her artistic process of creating The Weather)

== Recognition ==
- DAAD, Berlin Artist's-in-Residence (1986)
- Visual Artist's Fellowship in Photography, The National Endowment for the Arts (1986)
- The 43rd Venice Biennale - Due Mille Prize (1988)
- John Simon Guggenheim Memorial Foundation Fellowship in Fine Arts (1988)
- The Louis Comfort Tiffany Foundation Award (1989)
- The Frederick Weisman Foundation Award (1991)
- Wexner Center for the Arts Fellowship (1997)
- Visual Artist's Fellowship in Photography, The National Endowment for the Arts (2006)
- Getty Research Institute Visiting Scholar (2007)
- Wynn Newhouse Award (2009)
- Visual Arts Grant, Foundation of Contemporary Arts (2016)

== Exhibitions ==
Bloom's work has been shown widely including exhibitions at: The Metropolitan Museum of Art, New York; The Museum of Modern Art, New York; Museum Boijmans van Beuningen, Rotterdam; Stedelijk Museum, Amsterdam; Museum of Contemporary Art, Los Angeles; the Venice Biennale; Kunstverein München, Munich; Art Gallery of New South Wales, Sydney; The Serpentine Gallery, London; Kunsthalle Zürich; Württembergischer Kunstverein, Stuttgart; Carnegie Museum of Art, Pittsburgh; Leo Castelli Gallery, New York; SITE Santa Fe; Louisiana Museum of Modern Art, Denmark; La Bienale de Venezuela, Caracas; Museum Friedricianum, Kassel; Parrish Art Museum, Southampton; Wexner Center for the Arts; Cooper-Hewitt Design Museum; International Center of Photography, New York; Martin-Gropius-Bau, Berlin; The Jewish Museum, New York; The Front Triennial, The Allen Memorial Art Museum, Ohio.

She is represented by David Lewis Gallery, New York; Capitain Petzel, Berlin; Galleria Raffaella Cortese, Milano; and Galerie Gisela Capitain, Cologne.

== Collections ==
Barbara Bloom's works are featured in a variety of public collections including: Museum of Modern Art, New York; Metropolitan Museum of Art, New York; Pérez Art Museum Miami, Florida; The Art Institute of Chicago; Los Angeles County Museum of Art; Stedelijk Museum, Amsterdam; Museum of Contemporary Art, Los Angeles; MAK Museum of Applied Art, Vienna; International Center of Photography, New York; Israel Museum, Jerusalem; Australian National Gallery, Canberra; Groninger Museum, The Netherlands; Museum of Contemporary Art, Helsinki, Finland; Yokohama Museum of Art, Yokohama, Japan, the CU Art Museum at the University of Colorado Boulder, among others.

== Publications ==
- Gold Custody, Mack Books, 2021. With Ben Lerner
- A Picture, A Thousand Words, David Lewis, New York, 2017
- Gifts, Ludion, Antwerp, Belgium, 2015
- The St. Petersburg Paradox, Swiss Institute, New York and Karma, New York, 2014
- As it were... so to speak: a museum collection in dialogue with Barbara Bloom, The Jewish Museum, New York, 2013
- Between Artists: John Baldessari and Barbara Bloom, A.R.T. Press, New York, 2011
- The Collections of Barbara Bloom, Bloom, Dave Hickey, Susan Tallman, Steidl, and International Center of Photography, NY, 2008
- Flash Cards, The Renaissance Society, Chicago, 2003
- Broken, Bloom and Miller, J. Abbott, Pentagram Papers, New York, 2001
- Dinge in der Kunst des XX. Jahrhunderts, Haus der Kunst, München, 2000
- Revised Evidence: Nabokov’s Inscriptions, Annotations. Glenn Horowitz Bookseller, New York, 1999
- The Museum As Muse: Artists Reflect, the Museum of Modern Art, New York, 1999
- Pictures From The Floating World, Sala de Exposiciones Rekalde, D.L, Bilbao, 1998
- Contemplation: Five Installations: Barbara Bloom, Ann Hamilton With Kathryn Clark, Nam June Paik, Robert Ryman, James Turrell, Des Moines Art Center, Des Moines, Iowa, 1996
- Consider The Alternatives: 20 Years Of Contemporary Art At Hallwalls, Hallwalls Contemporary Arts Center, Buffalo, New York, 1996
- Longing And Belonging: From The Faraway Nearby: Site Santa Fe, July 14 To October 8, 1995, Santa Fe, New Mexico, SITE Santa Fe, Santa Fe, New Mexico, 1995
- The Passions Of Natasha, Nokiko, Nicole, Nanette And Norma, Cantz Verlag, Stuttgart, 1993
- Never Odd Or Even. Verlag Silke Schreiber, Munich & The Carnegie Museum of Art, Pittsburgh, 1992
- De wooden en de beelden: tekst en beeld in de kunst van de twintigste eeuw, Utrecht Centraal Museum, Utrecht, 1991
- El Jardín salvaje, La Fundacion, Madrid, 1990
- Life size : a sense of the real in recent art, The Israel Museum, Jerusalem, 1990
- The Indomitable spirit : photographers and artists respond to the time of AIDS, Photographers + Friends United Against AIDS, New York, 1990
- The Reign of Narcissism. Wurtembergischer Kunstverein, The Serpentine Gallery, Kunsthalle Zurich, 1990
- The Readymade boomerang : certain relations in 20th-century art, Art Gallery of New South Wales, 11 April-3 June 1990, the eighth Biennale of Sydney, Art Gallery of New S. Wales, Sydney, 1990
- Assembled, Wright State University, Dayton, Ohio, 1990
- Die Endlichkeit Der Freiheit Berlin 1990: Ein Ausstellungsprojekt In Ost Und West, Edition Hentrich, Berlin, 1990
- Ghost Writer, Passagen Verlag, Vienna, 1992 (original version DAAD Berlin, 1986)
- Picture This: Films Chosen By Artists, Hallwalls Contemporary Arts Center, Buffalo, New York, 1987
- Lost and Found, Gemeentemuseum Arnhem, Arnhem, the Netherlands, 1987
- Esprit de l’Escalier. Hallwalls, Buffalo, New York, 1986
- A Calendar on Travel and Tourism, Mart.Spruijt, Amsterdam, 1986
- Soundtrack to The French Diplomat’s Office. Bloom & Christian Marclay, BlumArts, NY, 1999

== Teaching ==
Bloom has held teaching positions at: Cooper Union School of Art, New York; ICP-Bard Program in Advanced Photographic Studies; Art Institute of Boston at Lesley University; Columbia University-School of the Arts; Yale University- Graduate Department of Sculpture; School of Visual Arts, New York, Rijksakademie van Beeldende Kunsten, Amsterdam.
