= Carlos Basualdo =

Argentine curator

Carlos Basualdo is an Argentinian curator who is the Director of the Nasher Sculpture Center in Dallas, Texas. Prior to the Nasher Sculpture Center, Basualdo held positions at the Philadelphia Museum of Art, first serving as the Keith L. and Katherine Sachs Curator of Contemporary Art at the Philadelphia Museum of Art from 2005 to 2022, before being named the Marion Boulton (Kippy) Stroud Deputy Director and Chief Curator. Earlier roles include Curator at Large at MAXXI-Museo nazionale delle arti del XXI secolo in Rome, Italy. He has taught at the IUAV University of Venice and PennDesign at the University of Pennsylvania. Basualdo has written extensively for scholarly journals and art publications, including Artforum, ARTnews and The Art Journal.

== Education ==
Basualdo received his degree in literature from the National University of Rosario in 1982, and also participated in the Independent Study Program of the Critical Studies Program at the Whitney Museum of American Art, New York (1994–1995).

== Career ==
Basualdo is a 2013 Fellow of the Center for Curatorial Leadership in NYC. In 2006, Basualdo initiated two exhibition series at the Philadelphia Museum of Art titled Notations and Live Cinema, both of which are devoted to the permanent collection and video. In 2021 he curated the retrospective Jasper Johns: Mind/Mirror, at the Philadelphia Museum of Art, co-organized with Scott Rothkopt and the Whitney Museum. He was the lead organizer of Bruce Nauman: Topological Gardens that represented the United States at the 2007 Venice Biennale, where it was awarded the Golden Lion for Best National Participation. He organized a survey exhibition of the work of the Italian artist Michelangelo Pistoletto (2009), a collaboration between the Philadelphia Museum of Art and MAXXI. Basualdo was part of the curatorial team for Documenta 11, the 50th Venice Biennale, and conceived and curated Tropicalia: A Revolution in Brazilian Culture, which traveled from the MCA Chicago to the Barbican Gallery in London (2004-2005) as well as the Bronx Museum in New York and the Museu de Arte Moderna in Rio de Janeiro (2006-2007). In 2012 Basualdo curated Dancing Around the Bride: Cage, Cunningham, Johns, Rauschenberg and Duchamp, an exhibition about the relationships between the work of Marcel Duchamp, John Cage, Merce Cunningham, Jasper Johns, and Robert Rauschenberg. In 2021, he began a collaboration with Penn Medicine to present contemporary works by Philadelphia artists across ten floors of their new facility designed by Foster + Partners.

Among his many publications are Giuseppe Penone: The Life of Forms, 2019, Gagosian Gallery and Rizzoli; and Cy Twombly: Fifty days at liam, 2018, Philadelphia Museum of Art.
