= Rita Gonzalez =

American curator, author and media artist

Rita Gonzalez is an American curator, author and media artist. She is the head of the contemporary art department at Los Angeles County Museum of Art (LACMA), an institution she has worked at since 2004. Many of her curatorial projects involve under-recognized Latinx and Latin American artists.

== Early life and education ==
Gonzalez grew up in Whittier, California, studied at University of California, Santa Cruz (UCSC), University of California, San Diego (UCSD), and completed P.h.D. coursework in the University of California, Los Angeles (UCLA) film, television and digital media program on topics related to representation of Chicano art in contemporary art discourse.

In 2018, Gonzalez participated in the Center for Curatorial Leadership program, with Anne Pasternak as her mentor at the Brooklyn Museum.

== Career ==
From 1997 to 1999, Gonzalez served as the Lila Wallace Curatorial Fellow at the Museum of Contemporary Art San Diego.

Gonzalez's curatorial oeuvre at LACMA includes Phantom Sightings: Art after the Chicano Movement (2008), Asco: Elite of the Obscure, A Retrospective, 1972–1987 (2011), L.A. Exuberance: New Gifts by Artists (2016), and A Universal History of Infamy (2018), a collaboration with José Luis Blondet and Pilar Tompkins Rivas.

In 2017, Gonzalez served on the jury for the stand prizes of Frieze Art Fair.
