= Institute of Contemporary Art, Los Angeles =

Contemporary art museum

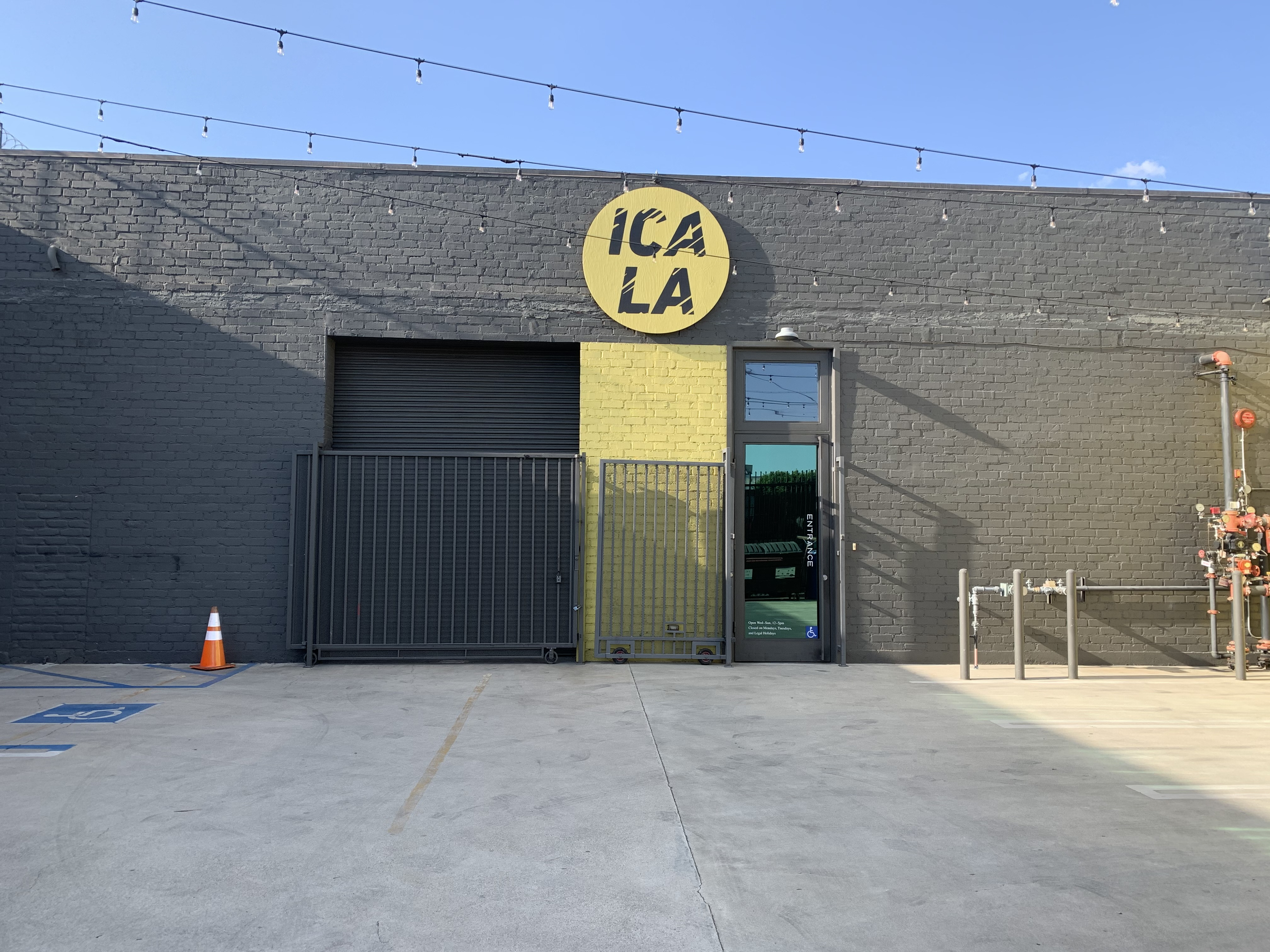
- Established: 1984
- Location: 1717 East 7th Street; Los Angeles, CA 90021
- Coordinates: 34.035179°N 118.235587°W
- Type: Art
- Director: Anne Ellegood
- Website: theicala.org

The Institute of Contemporary Art, Los Angeles (ICA LA; formerly known as the Santa Monica Museum of Art) is a contemporary art museum in Los Angeles, California, United States. As an independent and non-collecting art museum (or kunsthalle), it exhibits the work of local, national, and international contemporary artists. Until May 2015, the museum was based at the Bergamot Station Arts Center in Santa Monica, California. In May 2016, the museum announced an official name change to the Institute of Contemporary Art, Los Angeles (ICA LA) and its relocation to Los Angeles's Downtown Arts District. The museum reopened to the public in September 2017.

== History ==
The museum was founded as the Santa Monica Museum of Art in 1984 by Abby Sher as part of the Frank Gehry-designed mixed-use center, Edgemar, which she developed on Main Street in Santa Monica, California between 1984 and 1988. In 1988, Thomas Rhoads was named the museum's director, mounting that summer its first exhibition, Art in the Raw in the 8,000 square foot clear span, clerestory-rimmed 1908 Imperial Ice Company warehouse building. In 1997, SMMoA moved from Edgemar, reopening in Bergamot Station Arts Center in 1998.

Following a $5 million fundraising campaign, the museum relocated to Downtown Los Angeles in 2017. The firm wHY Architecture, under the direction of Kulapat Yantrasast, renovated the 12,700-square-foot former manufacturing building that now serves as the ICA LA's home.

The museum's mission focused on pivotal but under-recognized moments and figures in the history of contemporary art and culture and exhibiting local and international artists early in their careers. The museum's current mission "is to support art that sparks the pleasure of discovery and challenges the way we see and experience the world, ourselves, and each other. [ICA LA] is committed to upending hierarchies of race, class, gender, and culture. Through exhibitions, education programs, and community partnerships, [ICA LA] fosters critique of the familiar and empathy with the different."

In 2024, the museum announced a $5 million plan to purchase and remodel the building it occupies. Most of the funding will be provided by the Mohn Family Trust.

== Exhibitions ==
From its inception, the museum developed a reputation for hosting groundbreaking exhibitions for future art world luminaries. Under the banner of the Museum's Artist Project series, Director Thomas Rhoads and his team of curators organized shows for Andrea Bowers, Meg Cranston, Bruce and Norman Yonemoto, and Lynn Aldrich. They arranged the first solo shows for Daniel J. Martinez (1988), Jennifer Steinkamp (1989), William Leavitt (1990), and Allan Sekula (1996) among others. Upon the Museum's relocation to Bergamot Station Arts Center, the Artist Project Series continued in the Museum's two Project Rooms. The inaugural exhibition at Bergamot featured emerging artist Liza Lou and her beaded, full-size kitchen and backyard installations.

Elsa Longhauser succeeded Thomas Rhoads as executive director in 2000 and marked her arrival with a retrospective of feminist Austrian artist Valie Export. During Longhauser's tenure, the museum hosted exhibitions of work by Yoshimoto Nara (2000), Urs Fischer (2002), Terry Allen (2004), Michael Queenland (2012), and Mickalene Thomas (2012). Other important exhibitions at the Museum included The Book Show: Raymond Pettibon (2001), Cavepainting: Laura Owens, Chris Ofili, Peter Doig (2002), Michael Asher (2008 ), Allen Ruppersberg: You and Me or the Art of Give and Take (2009). The museum also organized acclaimed shows by guest-curators, including Michael Duncan and Kristine McKenna's Semina Culture: Wallace Berman and His Circle (2005), a Walter Hopps-curated George Herms exhibition (2005), and Jori Finkel's Identity Theft: Eleanor Antin, Lynn Hershman Leeson, and Suzy Lake (2007).

== Programs ==
As SMMoA, the museum offered a full-range of free public programs including lectures and panel discussions, and award-winning education programs for K-12 children. One of the museum's most immersive outreach programs was Park Studio, a free and intensive weeklong art workshop series that coincides with academic spring breaks at SMMUSD and LAUSD public schools. Wall Works was SMMoA's award-winning education program that links K-12 students directly with renowned contemporary artists. Wall Works projects were carried out in the classroom, and culminate with a public exhibition of student work at Bergamot Station Arts Center. Artists who have participated in Park Studio and Wall Works include Olga Koumoundouros, Elias Sime, Peter Shire, Karen Kimmel, and Laurel Broughton.

SMMoA's A Collection of Ideas… was a public program and lecture series with innovative thinkers from all disciplines. Past A Collection of Ideas... events include a discussion around Mike Kelley's final project, the Mobile Homestead (2013), and Crossfader: Listening Like a Sonidero, a hybrid musical-lecture with Josh Kun and Mexican DJ and producer Toy Selectah (2013).

SMMoA's Cause for Creativity workshops: SMMoA's Cause for Creativity (C4C) combined art, social action, and community partnerships to enhance the life of the mind and spirit. "Make art and make a difference" was the motto of this innovative program designed for participants of all ages. Workshops have been taught by The Echo Park Film Center, BROODWORK, and Cirque du Soleil's OVO.

As ICA LA, the museum launched its Agency of Assets program in 2016, offering youth development opportunities for high school teens through paid internships in the arts and culture sector.

== Management ==
Thomas Rhoads was the museum's first executive director. In 2000, former director of the Moore College of Art and Design galleries, Elsa Longhauser, was named executive director. Longhauser announced that she would step down from her role as executive director in mid-2019. In July 2019, Anne Ellegood, former senior curator at the Hammer Museum was named the museum's new executive director.

Amanda Sroka is the current senior curator for the ICA LA. Previous staff curators include Lisa Melandri, current executive director of the Contemporary Art Museum St. Louis, Jeffrey Uslip, and Jamillah James.
