= Alma Allen (artist) =

American sculptor

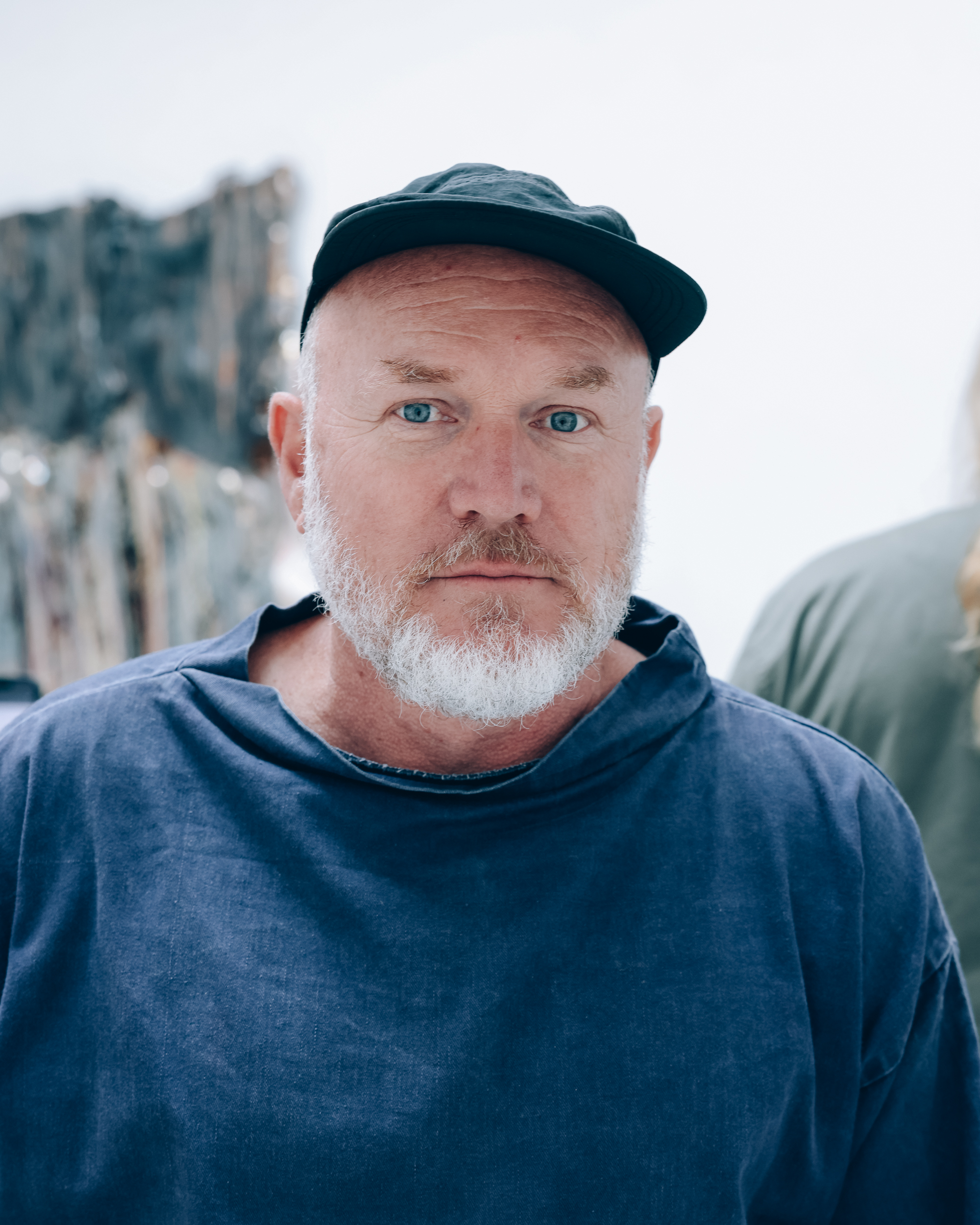
- Alma Allen at Venice Biennale 2026.
- Born: Salt Lake City, Utah

Alma Allen is an American sculptor. He lived and worked in Joshua Tree, California. He currently works in Tepotzlán, Mexico.

== Work ==
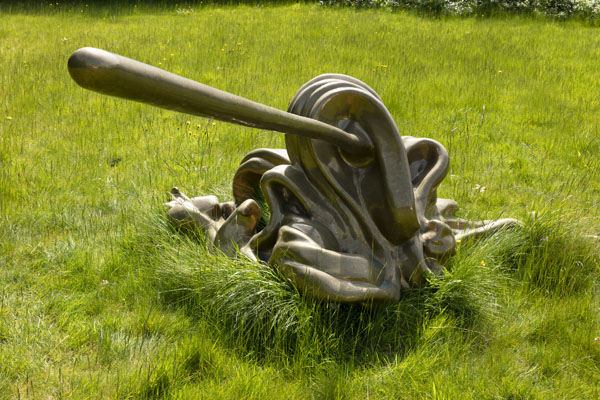
Not yet titled (2021). Museum Dhondt-Dhaenens

Carved from foraged wood and stone or cast in bronze, Allen's sculptures range in scale from thimble-sized fetishes to several ton pseudo-figures. Though made of the densest materials, the highly polished works appear to be in states of silent, inchoate movement. The New York Times described the shapes as "sensuous biomorphic forms", and 2014 Whitney Biennial co-curator Michelle Grabner selected three of Allen's large-scale sculptures for inclusion in the 2014 Biennial.

== Career and critical reception ==
Prior to the 2014 Biennial, the self-taught artist was known to a following of collectors, but less so to the wider art establishment. He rarely exhibited, preferring to sell independently from his Mojave Desert studio, which the artist designed and built himself. The remote location of his studio, one hundred miles from Los Angeles on the edge of the Joshua Tree National Park, led to a reputation as a recluse.

Biennial literature, however, sourced originality in a practice which developed "independently of any recognized art movement" and cited its "impeccable sense of material and form" as the reason for Allen's unlikely discovery by the art world.

Though press accounts had previously taken notice of Allen's painstaking forms, modernist furniture in the tradition of Isamu Noguchi and Donald Judd, images of Allen's Biennial contributions circulated widely in mainstream art-specialized media following the exhibition. Time magazine named his white marble Untitled, 2013, one of the "Five Best Works at the Whitney Biennial", and writing for T: The New York Times Style Magazine, the director Matt Tyrnauer profiled the artist's "road less traveled to art world stardom." Writing in Artforum, critic Andrew Berardini referred to the "gravitational force" of the works in a solo exhibition of Allen's work at Blum & Poe gallery. Allen "interrogates his own place in the vacuum of art history in the only way he knows: by manipulating the nature of materials, a knotty, manifest language of the world", wrote critic Christina Catherine Martinez.

Allen is representing the United States at the 2026 Venice Biennale.
