= Angolan art =

Visual arts of Angola

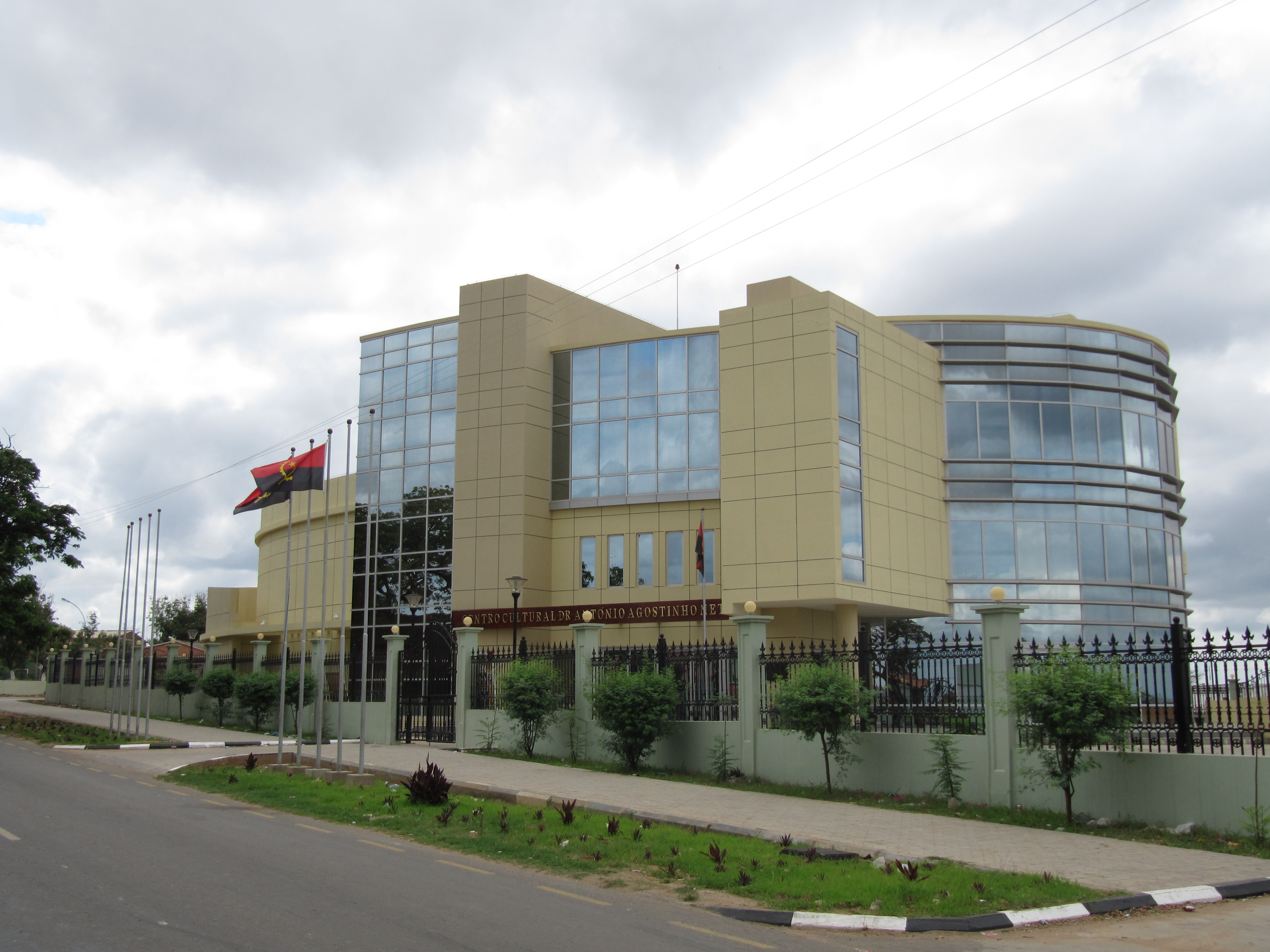
Agostinho Neto Cultural Center in Catete, Angola

Angolan art comprises the visual arts produced in the territory of present-day Angola, from prehistoric rock art and the carving traditions of the country's Bantu populations to the modern and contemporary work made since the late colonial period. The best known historical tradition is the sculpture of the Chokwe people of the north-east, while contemporary Angolan art gained wide international attention after the country's first national pavilion at the Venice Biennale won the Golden Lion in 2013.

== Rock art ==
Rock art in Angola includes both paintings and petroglyphs, concentrated relatively near the Atlantic coast, with further sites documented in the east of the country near the border with Zambia. Motifs include animals, human figures and geometric signs, sometimes arranged in what appear to be hunting or combat scenes; firearms appear at some sites, indicating work made after contact with Europeans from the 16th century.

The most studied complex is Tchitundu-Hulu in Namibe Province, a group of four sites around a series of inselbergs on a semi-arid plain. Its engravings include pecked concentric circles, and its paintings combine several colours, mostly in geometric signs but also in anthropomorphic and animal forms. The site was first documented in the 1950s and has since been examined by researchers including Henri Breuil and J. Desmond Clark.

== Traditional arts ==
=== Chokwe sculpture ===
Chokwe carving is among the most widely collected of central African sculptural traditions. Its subjects include figures drawn from Lunda court mythology, notably the culture hero Chibinda Ilunga, along with female counterparts, and the tradition expanded in the 19th century as the Chokwe grew wealthy from hunting and the ivory trade after the Portuguese abolition of slave trading in Angola in the 1830s.

Characteristic forms include the pwo mask, worn in masquerades associated with womanhood and fertility, seated and standing ancestral figures, chiefly chairs adapted from early Portuguese furniture designs and carved with scenes of Chokwe life, and utilitarian objects such as snuff containers. Materials include wood, raffia fibre, copper and brass, beads and natural pigments. The Chokwe are also associated with sona sand drawing, a geometric drawing practice performed as narrative, which colonial ethnography recorded and reproduced in print.

=== Other traditions ===
Carving, pottery, basketry and textile work are practised across Angola's ethnic groups, each with distinct regional styles, and masks and figures continue to be produced for both ritual and commercial markets. The Kongo areas of the north are associated with nkisi power figures, examples of which entered European ethnographic collections in the late 19th and early 20th centuries.

== Colonial period ==
Under Portuguese rule, Angolan material culture was collected and interpreted largely through colonial institutions. The Dundo Museum in Lunda Norte Province, founded by the Diamang diamond company, assembled one of the most important collections of Chokwe masks and sculpture, along with photographs dating from the 1880s and recordings of local music. The Belgian art historian Marie-Louise Bastin (1918–2000) documented the collection, and her publications remain a standard reference for Chokwe styles. Many works disappeared from the museum during the Angolan Civil War of 1975 to 2002, and some have since been traced and returned.

== Modern art and angolanidade ==
Modern Angolan painting developed alongside the cultural nationalism of angolanidade, which sought to define an Angolan identity distinct from that of the colonial power. Vítor Manuel Teixeira (Viteix, 1940–1993) used abstraction incorporating ethnic symbolism as a vehicle for anti-colonial and national themes in the 1960s and 1970s. After independence in 1975, artists including António Ole (born 1951) documented the countryside in film and photography and combined found materials with painting; his sculpture Mitologias II (1984) is one of the few modern works installed in Luanda's public space.

== Contemporary art ==
Angola participated in the Venice Biennale with a national pavilion for the first time in 2013, at the Palazzo Cini. The photographer Edson Chagas showed Found Not Taken, poster-sized images of discarded objects repositioned against weathered architecture in Luanda, stacked on pallets for visitors to take away. The pavilion, curated by Paula Nascimento, Stefano Rabolli Pansera and Jorge Gumbe, received the Golden Lion for best national participation, the first time the award had gone to an African pavilion. Angola returned to the Biennale in 2015 with a group exhibition and again in 2017.

Other Angolan artists with international profiles include Kiluanji Kia Henda (born 1978) and Nástio Mosquito (born 1981). In Luanda, artist-led spaces and galleries have concentrated in the former Hotel Globo, a 1950s modernist building reoccupied as an arts hub, and much recent work addresses colonial memory, the civil war and questions of national identity.

== Institutions ==
Collections of Angolan art are held by the National Museum of Anthropology in Luanda and the Dundo Museum. The Sindika Dokolo Foundation assembled a large collection of contemporary African art in Luanda and funded the recovery of works looted from Angolan museums.

== See also ==
- Culture of Angola
- List of Angolan artists
- Angolan pavilion
- Angolan literature
- Music of Angola
