= List of Angolan artists =

The following list of Angolan artists (in alphabetical order by last name) includes artists of various genres, who are notable and are either born in Angola, of Angolan descent or who produce works that are primarily about Angola.

== K ==
- Makina Kameya (1920–1988)

== M ==
- Hildebrando de Melo (born 1978)
- Nástio Mosquito (born 1981)

== N ==
- Albano Neves e Sousa (1921–1995)

== O ==
- António Ole (born 1951)

== L ==
- Luanda Lozano (born 1973) Angolan-born printmaker

== S ==
- Imanni da Silva (born 1981)
- Pamina Sebastião (born 1988)

== See also ==
- List of Angolans
