= Angolan pavilion =

Venice Biennale national pavilion

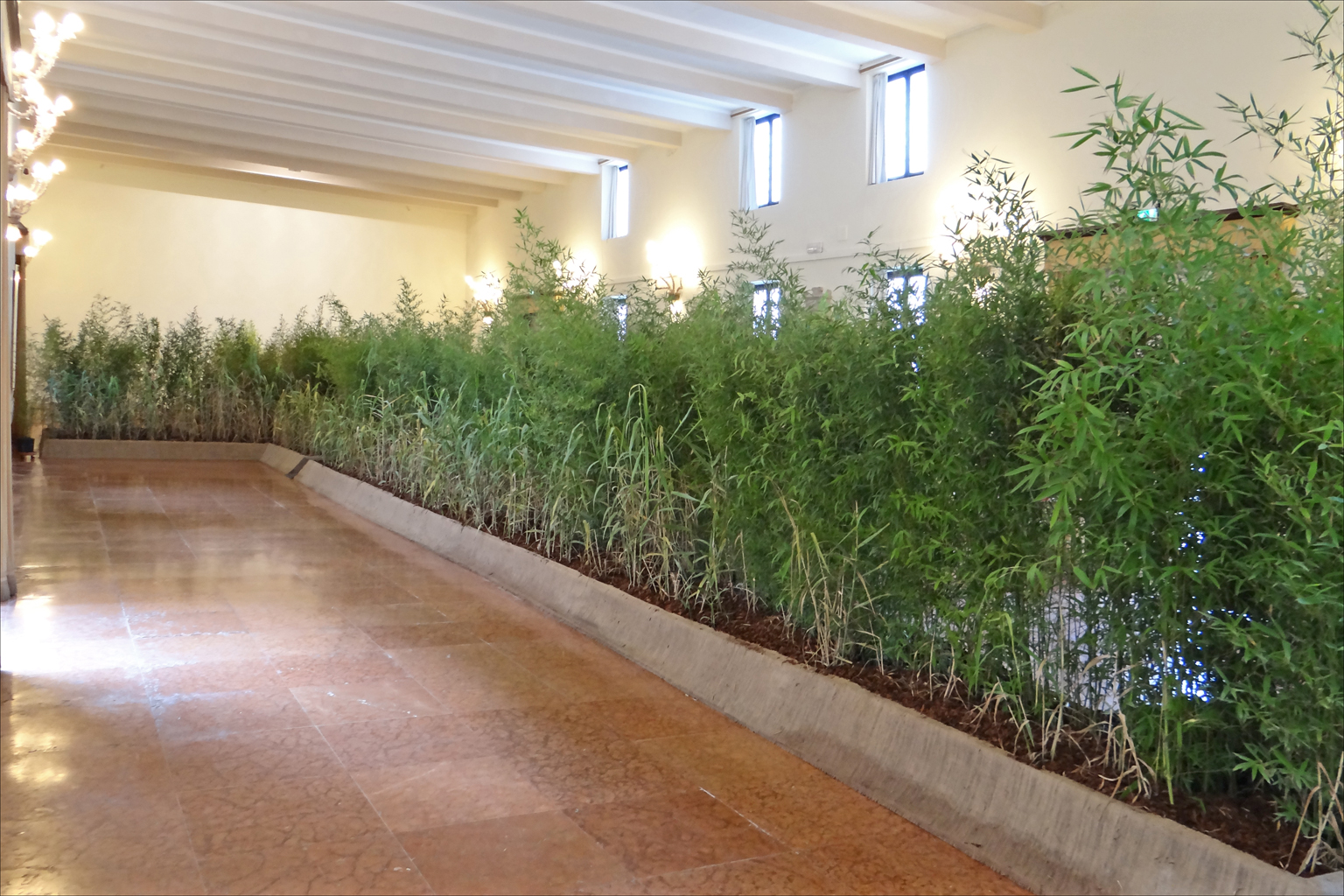
Le pavillon national de lAngola (Biennale darchitecture, Venise) (8170647337)

The Angolan pavilion, representing the nation of Angola, has participated in the Venice Biennale since 2013. As one of the biennial international art exhibition's national pavilions, Angola mounts a show in a Venetian palazzo outside Venice's Giardini. The first Angolan pavilion, which featured the photography of Edson Chagas, became the first African national pavilion to receive the biennial's top prize, the Golden Lion for best national pavilion. Chagas displayed poster-sized photographs of resituated, abandoned objects and weathered architecture in the Angolan capital of Luanda. Reviewers praised the interplay between the photographed subject matter and the Italian Renaissance artwork that adorned the hosting palazzo's walls. The 2015 Biennale hosted a group show of five Angolan artists on themes of intergenerational dialogue. After participating in the 2017 Biennale, Angola did not present in the subsequent three art biennales.

== Background ==
The Venice Biennale is an international art biennial exhibition held in Venice, Italy. Often described as "the Olympics of the art world", the Biennale is a prestigious event for contemporary artists known for propelling career visibility. The festival has become a constellation of shows: a central exhibition curated by that year's artistic director, national pavilions hosted by individual nations, and independent exhibitions throughout Venice. The Biennale parent organization also hosts regular festivals in other arts: architecture, dance, film, music, and theater.

Outside of the central, international exhibition, individual nations produce their own shows, known as pavilions, as their national representation. Nations that own their pavilion buildings, such as the 30 housed on the Giardini, are responsible for their own upkeep and construction costs as well. Nations without dedicated buildings, such as Angola, create pavilions in venues throughout the city.

Prior to the pavilion's establishment, Angolan artists participated in the 2007 Venice Biennale's "African Pavilion", curated by Fernando Alvim and Simon Njami.

== 2013 ==
For the 55th Venice Biennale, in 2013, Angola joined nine other countries as first-time participants. The Angolan pavilion exhibition, Luanda, Encyclopedic City, was held in the Palazzo Cini near Venice's Ponte dell'Accademia and featured Angolan artist Edson Chagas's photograph series of abandoned objects and weathered architecture in Angola's capital of Luanda. Chagas displayed his photographs as 4,000 poster-sized prints stacked atop 23 crates throughout the opulent room, lined with opulent paintings and crafts from the early Italian Renaissance. Visitors were invited to take the photo poster prints with the artist's intention that the exhibition would end when the prints ran out. such as Sassetta and Botticelli. The Palazzo Cini had been closed for the previous two decades, but reopened for Angola with the proviso that Chagas could not modify the fragile building or move anything inside. The exhibition's title refers to the Angolan capital, Luanda, and the Biennale's central exhibition, The Encyclopedic Palace. The pavilion was curated by Paula Nascimento and Stefano Rabolli Pansera. Elsewhere in the building, as part of the pavilion, "Angola in Movement" curated works from the collection of the National Insurance Company of Angola.

The photographs on display came from Chagas's larger series, "Found Not Taken". This series included conceptually similar photographs from cities besides Luanda. By request of the pavilion's curators, Chagas solely used the Luanda photographs. The artist found the request agreeable because the smaller set of photographs did not take the series out of context. The cities he photographed—London, Luanda, and Newport—each were preparing to host major events and, to Chagas, demonstrated a "sense of renewal" and rehabilitation in its culture. Coming from Luanda, where most resources and objects were reused, Chagas noted how consumer habits have evolved over time. He photographed each object in spaces where it interacted with its environment. Some objects were shot in nearly the same space as they were found, while others had to be moved. Through this method, Chagas felt that he learned the city's rhythm. He planned to continue the series.

The pavilion was the biennial's "breakout star". It was a surprise winner of the Biennale's top prize, the Golden Lion for best national pavilion. The jury commended Chagas in expressing the "irreconcilability and complexity of site". The New York Times and Frieze too acknowledged the pavilion's understanding of spatial relations in the juxtaposition of Chagas's photographs against the building's Catholic decorations, reflected in aspects such as the monetary value differences between the weary, discarded objects in the photographs and the aged relics on the palazzo's walls. Frieze added that, compared to other African national pavilions, Angola's was responsive to its context yet unconcerned with "reifying otherness". While artwork has long been used to recontextualize space, Frieze's Amy Sherlock appreciated how the cheaply produced, unwieldy posters would likely end up as street or canal debris, another step in the cycle of consumerism. She resisted the urge of taking a poster, considering the wealth of other items she had collected at the Biennale, but when she gave in, she felt "that this inevitability was an essential part of the piece". Art – Das Kunstmagazin, however, questioned the jury's choice and partiality—a stance, in turn, criticized by a writer for OkayAfrica. The award made Angola the first African nation to win the Biennale's top honors. Artsy's Giles Peppiatt later named Chagas's series as a recommended purchase at the 2014 1:54 contemporary African art fair.

== Later years ==
At the next Biennale, Angola presented five artists in On Ways of Traveling. Based on the idea of an intergenerational dialogue, the exhibition focuses on how a younger generation of artists and citizens in an independent Angola further the legacies and cultural fusions of past generations. Francisco Vidal showed Utopia Luanda Machine, a mixed-media work that folds into crates and includes images of Zadie Smith, Kanye West, and cotton plants painted on machetes. The artist hoped to create a new African Industrial Revolution that would combine art, craft, and design. Other works included Binelde Hyrcan's humorous short video of four boys on an imaginary road trip, Délio Jasse's layered images floating in a basin of colored water, Nelo Teixiera's mask sculptures, and António Ole's assemblage of plastic tubs. Ole also served as the exhibition's curator. The show mounted in Venice's Palazzo Pisani a San Stefano. The pavilion's commissioner, RitaGT, said that the Angolan Ministry of Culture had been a strong supporter of participation in the Biennale for its impact both on the country and in bringing its contemporary art to an international stage.

Ole returned to represent Angola in the 2017 Biennale. He showed five short films from his Lisbon Gulbenkian Museum 50-year career retrospective. The documentaries and narrative films traced Angola's history and Ole's career. The scenes focus on Angola's post-colonial independence, e.g., women singing at a carnival, the first Angolan president, and the forced migration of the Nambuangongo people. The films were projected onto the white walls of a two-story room.

The country did not participate in the subsequent three biennales. (Note: Angola did not participate in 2019, 2022, or 2024.)

== Representation by year ==
#	Year	Title	Artist(s)	Curator(s)	Location	Ref
60th	2024	Did not participate	–	–	–	
59th	2022	Did not participate	–	–	–	
58th	2019	Did not participate	–	–	–	
57th	2017	Magnetic Memory/Historical Resonance	António Ole	Maria da Silva de Oliveira e Silva, Paulo Kussy Correia Fernandes, Antonio Ole	Venice Art Space, Fondamenta degli Incurabili	
56th	2015	On Ways of Traveling	Francisco Vidal, António Ole, Binelde Hyrcan, Délio Jasse, Nelo Teixiera	António Ole	Palazzo Pisani a San Stefano	
55th	2013	Luanda, Encyclopedic City	Edson Chagas	Paula Nascimento, Stefano Rabolli Pansera	Palazzo Cini	
