= Ayana Evans =

American performance artist

Ayana M. Evans
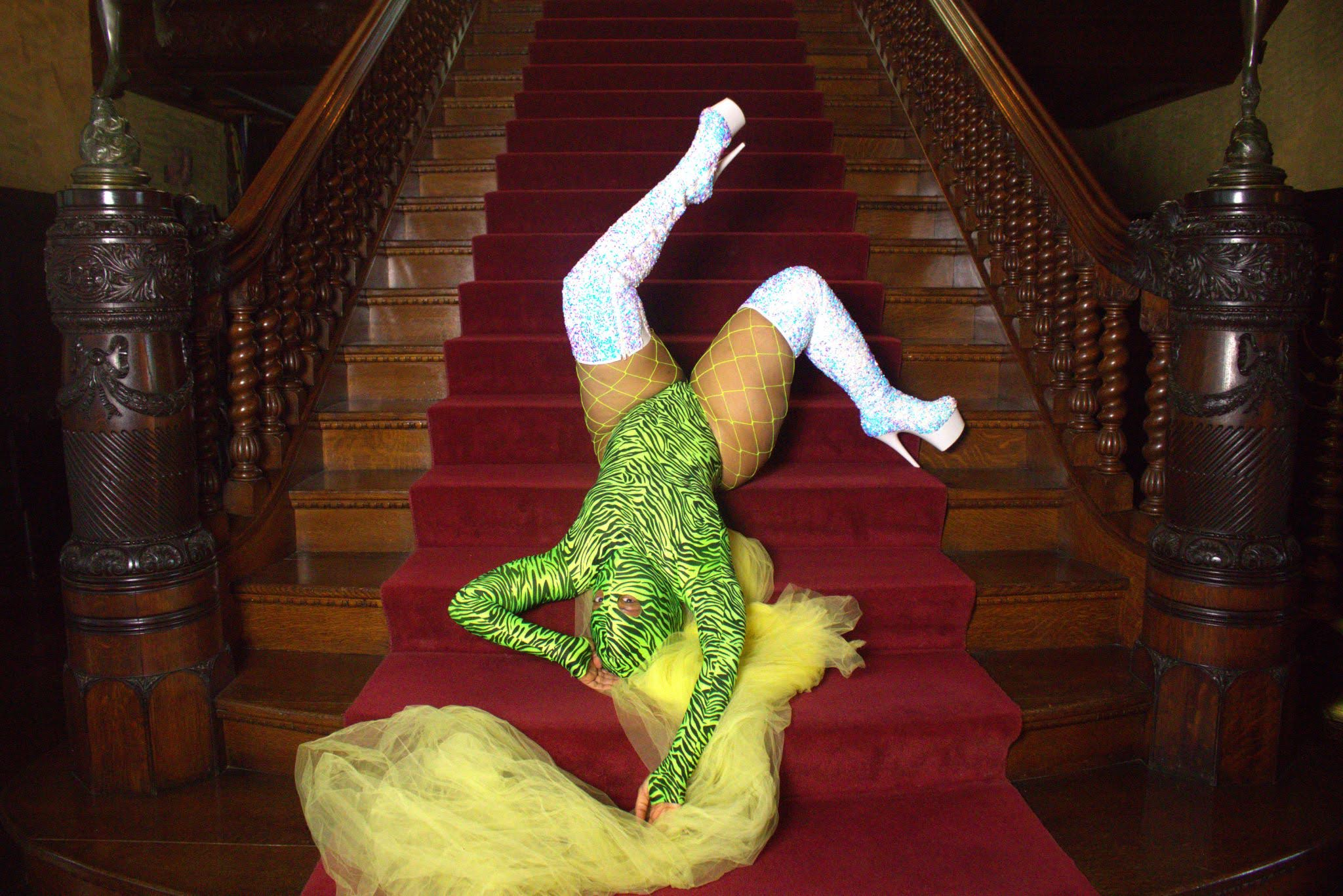
- Born: Cleveland, Ohio
- Education: Brown University; Tyler School of Art and Architecture

Ayana M. Evans is an African-American performance artist and educator based in New York City and an adjunct professor of visual art at New York University and Brooklyn College. She also serves as editor-at-large of Cultbytes, an online art publication.

Ayana Evans's professional training focuses on traditional art forms, including painting, sculpture and fashion design. Her performances use ordinary activities such as crossing the street, changing clothes and exercising to call attention to her experience as an African-American woman. She has performed on the streets, museums, and art festivals around the United States, Martinique, and Ghana.

== Personal life ==
Ayana Evans grew up in Chicago. Her mother and father, both behavioral health therapists, were from Alabama and Mississippi, respectively. She earned a Master of Fine Arts in painting from the Tyler School of Art at Temple University and a BA in Visual Arts from Brown University. She also attended the Skowhegan School of Painting and Sculpture and has an Associates Degree in Accessories Design from the Fashion Institute of Technology.

== Career ==
Ayana Evans shifted from fashion and painting to performance art to challenge her viewers. "In performance [as opposed to fashion] art, you are not worrying about capitalism. You can make the angriest painting, but when you put it on the wall, someone can walk away from it. But, if you are a performance artist I can cuss you out in person – I can throw a chair at you – and you got to jump," she told The Conversation. Since making the transition, she has performed at museums, galleries, and performance art festivals in the United States and Africa, including Newark Museum, Queens Museum, Bronx Museum, Barnes Foundation, Medium Tings Gallery, Cuchifritos Gallery + Project Space, NADA on Governor's Island, Panoply Performance Lab, and Ghana's Chale Wote festival.

Her live performances have included "Operation Catsuit", in which she walks around midtown Manhattan wearing a neon-green zebra-print bodysuit and purple stiletto-heeled shoes to gauge the reactions of passers-by, and "I Just Came Here to Find a Husband" in which she ties a laminated sign with that slogan to her back while attending public events. "I Just came Here to Find a Husband" requires physical and mental endurance, including walking for 2–4 hours, often during the heat of the day, answering personal questions, listening to romantic advice, posing for photos upon request, and explaining her performance practice.

In 2017, she performed "Throwing Hexes" as part of the Barnes Foundation's "A Person of the Crowd" exhibition. Also in 2017, she performed "African Body Snatchers" at the 7th Annual Chale Wote Street Art Festival in Accra, Ghana.

In 2020, during the COVID-19 global health crisis, Evans performed online as part of the Inverse Performance Festival, "Performance-in-Place: 4 Bodies 1 Screen" at The 8th Floor, Wa Na Wari, and Company Gallery, among others.

She has been featured as a speaker at Black Portraitures.

=== Residencies, grants, awards and collaborations ===
- Artist-in-resident, Art on the Vine (Martha's Vineyard), 2019.
- Fellow, Studio Immersion Program, EFA's Robert Blackburn Printmaking Workshop (NYC), 2018.
- Resident and grant recipient, Artists Alliance Inc (NYC), 2018.
- Awardee, Franklin Furnace Fund for performance art, 2017-2018.
- Fellow, Interdisciplinary Arts, New York Foundation of the Arts (NYFA), 2018.
- Artist-in-residence, El Museo Del Barrio (NYC), 2016. She titled her stay "Back in Five Minutes."
- Recipient, Jerome Foundation's Theater and Travel & Study Grant for artistic research abroad, 2015.
- Her collaborations include Marina Abramovic, Tania Bruguera, and William Pope L.

== Style ==
Ayana Evans centers her work around the intimate stories of black womanhood, exploring the social constructs of her own life. Trained as a painter and in fashion, color theory, texture, and fashion influence her work. Often her performances incorporate brightly colored fabrics, plastic tiaras, high heels, make-up, foodstuffs, and found objects to further engage viewers and to ground the work in both queer and popular culture.

=== Operation Catsuit ===
In 2012, Evans found the catsuit at designer Tiffany Rhodes, Butch Diva sample sale. It was one of the only things that fit her well, and so it became her art scene uniform, her trademark. Evans says that there is an aspect to her wearing the neon catsuit that is about self-acceptance and confidence.

According to Evans, "My Operation Catsuit persona is me being 100% me. My hope is that this encourages others to be 100 % themselves. Both within and outside of the Operation Catsuit series I often perform solo durational actions like jumping jacks and high kicks in heels for 2–3 hours at a gallery with a full face of makeup or push-ups in heels in an intersection. These performance actions are designed to highlight the repercussions of racism and misogyny, as well as the power of a woman taking up space in ways that are traditionally reserved for cis straight men in the United States."

In 2019, she was invited to present the ongoing project at the College Art Association's annual conference.

=== I Just Came Here to Find a Husband ===
Combining physical and mental endurance, this participatory ongoing performance intervention constitutes the artist wearing a sign reading: "I Just Came Here to Find a Husband." The piece was born out of the artist's longing to create her own family and the frustration of not being able to find a husband in 2015. Through humor for some and discomfort for others the piece unmasks the societal pressures women feel in relation to procreation and partnership and, as pointed out by a writer at The Root, serves as a commentary on the male and female gaze.

=== Social Health Performance Club ===
Co-founded in 2014 by Ayana Evans, Esther Neff, and Elizabeth Lamb, Social Health Performance Club gathers as a collective of artists to produce events, exhibitions, and other public art projects. SHPC is framed as performances to work through social relationships as artistic processes that require ongoing critique, checking in and safe space conversation. SHPC has performed at JACK, Abrons Arts Center, ABC No Rio, Queens Museum, and Gallery Sensei.

== Other activities ==
Ayana Evans co-edited Institution is a Verb: A Panoply Performance Lab Compilation, published by The Operating System, with Esther Neff, Tsedaye Makonnen, and Elizabeth Lamb. Seph Rodney, staff writer at Hyperallergic, praised the book as "a historical archive relating how the artists of PPL used that space to come into their powers and learn how to breathe fire.” About the publications importance Martha Wilson commented: "It's imperative [to document ephemeral art practice] if contemporary visual art performance is to be understood and analyzed in the future. The work of Panoply Performance Laboratory, which presented artists from 2012 to 2018, stands as a model organization, responsible for galvanizing the community it served."

Ayana Evans has curated several exhibitions beyond the collectives she participates in including Your Decolonizing Toolkit co-curated with Anna Mikaela Ekstrand at MAW in New York in 2016.
