= Glen Nelson =

American writer

Glen Nelson is an American poet, librettist, publisher, writer, and a ghostwriter of several New York Times nonfiction bestsellers. He wrote the libretto for The Book of Gold, an opera about Joseph Smith publishing the Book of Mormon. He is the founder of New York City's Mormon Artists Group and co-founder of the Center for Latter-day Saint Arts. He has written several nonfiction books that focus on Mormon artists.

== Writing career ==
Nelson is a graduate of New York University, where he studied James Joyce. Nelson has collaborated with Murray Boren on the following operas, cantatas, and song cycles. He wrote the libretto for an Easter cantata in 1991. He wrote the libretto for a one-act opera adaptation of Joyce's Dubliners entitled The Dead which was staged in 1993. He wrote the poetry for the song cycles Coney Island Songs and Pop Art Songs in 1995. That same year he wrote the poetry for the cantata Jesus, Lay Your Sleeping Head: A Cantata for the Christmas Season. He was the librettist for The Singer's Romance (1998), an opera based on the stories of Willa Cather. Nelson has also worked with other artists. He collaborated with composer David Fletcher on the song cycle Joseph Smith's Letters from Prison, which was performed in 2001. He has collaborated with Royce Twitchell on children's songs.

In 2005, the Church of Jesus Christ of Latter-day Saints (LDS Church) commissioned Nelson to write the libretto for an opera about Joseph Smith. He researched nineteenth-century literature in order to make the play's dialogue more authentic, and used events from historical records for the opera's plot. The play focuses on Smith's attempts to publish the Book of Mormon, and includes Smith translating the plates with a seer stone in a hat. Murray Boren composed the music for the opera, which was directed by Kory Katseanes. In 2001, Nelson's daughter had been hospitalized with a brain tumor, which Nelson said helped him identify with Joseph Smith's experience of worrying about his children's health and trying to publish a book; this inspired him to set the opera in the time Smith was trying to publish the Book of Mormon. Also in 2005, Nelson collaborated with David Fletcher on the song cycle Articles of Faith. In 2019, he wrote the libretto to an oratorio by Ethan Wickman called "To a Village Called Emmaus" for the annual American Festival Chorus and Orchestra. Nelson also wrote the libretto for the chamber opera "The Captivity of Hannah Duston" with Lansing McLoskey composing; excerpts were aired in 2019.

Nelson edited a collection of personal essays by fellow Mormons in New York in 2002. He wrote the production script for Fictionist's rock opera The Bridge, which he based on Ambrose Bierce's short story "An Occurrence at Owl Creek Bridge". The Bridge premiered in 2016. Nelson has also ghostwritten several New York Times nonfiction bestsellers.

== Mormon arts ==
Nelson founded the Mormon Arts Group in 1999. The group has published books and limited edition artworks, with some commercial publications. In 2010 they did 18 projects with 86 different artists.

Nelson and his wife Marcia started collecting artworks from friends after they married in 1986. Gradually, they made more purchases of Mormon artwork. In 2013, they published a book of their collection of more than 150 works through the Mormon Artists Group, including short biographies of the artists. They published a second edition in 2016.

In 2015, Nelson was a juror in the 10th annual International Art Competition for the LDS church.

=== The Center for Latter-day Saint Arts ===
Nelson and Richard Bushman co-founded the Mormon Arts Center and Mormon Arts Center Festival. The organization's name changed to The Center for Latter-day Saint Arts in 2019. The first festival was held in 2017 and included, among other events, a keynote address from Terryl Givens and a sing-along with Craig Jessop. Laura Hurtado curated an art show of 23 artworks from the LDS Church's permanent collection, including works by Jorge Cocco Santángelo, Annie Poon, and Brian Kershisnik. Givens said the festival was "a seminal event in Mormonism's coming of age artistically". Dieter F. Uchtdorf attended with his wife Harriet and their daughter Antje, who are on the advisory board for the center. Nelson is developing a database of Mormon composers and their works. In 2018, he curated a collection of Hildebrando de Melo's art for an exhibition at the Mormon Arts Center Festival. As of 2022, he manages the center's gallery and contributes to many of their other projects. He hosts the center's podcast, where he interviews LDS artists and scholars.

== Librettos ==
Nelson wrote the lyrics for the following works:

- The Captivity of Hannah Duston (2019)
- To a Village Called Emmaus (2019)
- The Book of Gold (2005)
- Joseph Smith's Letters from Prison (2001)
- My Children (2000)
- Afterwards (2000)
- Seven Sisters (2000)
- The Singer's Romance (1998)
- Jesus, Lay Your Sleeping Head: A Cantata for the Christmas Season (1995)
- Pop Art Songs (1995)
- Coney Island Songs (1995)
- The Dead (1993)
- Cantata No. 14 (1991)

== Selected nonfiction ==
- John Held, Jr.'s Fiction (no date)
- Joseph Paul Vorst (2017)
- "Joseph Paul Vorst and political art of the Great Depression" (2017) in The Kimball Challenge at Fifty
- Annie Poon: The Split House (2016)
- "Speaking for Herself" (2016) review of One Hundred Birds Taught Me to Fly
- "Mormon Masterworks of the 21st Century" (2016)
- Casey Jex Smith: War and Rumors of Wars (2015)
- The Glen and Marcia Nelson Collection of Mormon Art (2013; 2nd edition in 2016)
- Sunday is for the Sun, Monday is for the Moon: Teaching reading, one teacher and thirty children at a time (2012)
- Mormons at the Met (2012) - illustrations by Annie Poon
- "Mormon Artists Group: Adventures in Art Making" (2006)
- "A Portrait of Latter-day Saint Art" in City Saints: Mormons in the New York metropolis (2004)
- Silent Notes Taken: Personal Essays by Mormon New Yorkers, editor (2002)
- "Korean Opera Singer" (2001)

== Other publications ==
- The Bridge, rock opera production script (2015)
- Mormoniana, a collection of compositions by LDS composers inspired by LDS art (2005). Composers for Mormoniana included Crawford Gates, Robert Cundick, David Sargent, Reid Nibley, Rowan Taylor, and Deon Nielsen Price.
