= Tsedaye Makonnen =

Multidisciplinary artist

- Born: 1984 (age 41–42); Washington, D.C., U.S.

Tsedaye Makonnen (born 1984, Washington, D.C.) is a Black and Ethiopian American multidisciplinary visual and performance artist, curator, doula, and mother. Her work is inspired by Black women's experiences, including their experiences with police brutality and traumatic birth, and also often addresses themes of refuge, commemoration of the experiences of refugees, and forced migration.

== Art career ==
In 2016, Makonnen performed an Ethiopian coffee ceremony outside Zenebech, an Ethiopian restaurant in Shaw, Washington, D.C. that was closing.

Makonnen was the recipient of a 2019 Smithsonian Artist Research Fellowship.

At the 2019 Venice Biennale, Makonnen performed an impromptu piece in front of Christoph Büchel’s Barca Nostra, which displayed the wreckage of a ship on which 800 African migrants had drowned earlier that year. Her work included scattering rose petals around the wreckage and lying on the ground while holding a skull. She was confronted by security guards; she later released a video of the interaction as the work "When Drowning is the Best Option".

In 2020, Makonnen finished her residency at Savage-Lewis Residency at Martha’s Vineyard. As part of the residency, she created the solo piece "I Need a Motherfucking Doula" and collaborated with fellow artist Ayana Evans on the performance piece "Inserting Ourselves".

In early 2021, Makonnen was part of a four-artist exhibition at Art Dubai. From February to April 2022, her multimedia works Astral Sea I, III, and IV were on display at Artspace in New Haven, Connecticut as part of their Dyschronics exhibition. She performed at the Loophole of Refuge symposium in Venice, Italy in October 2022.

Makonnen's sculptures "Tsehai ፀሐይ Sunlight" and "Aberash አበራሽ You Give Light II" and her "Astral Sea" performance/textile series were displayed in the Metropolitan Museum of Art during their Africa & Byzantium exhibition in late 2023 and early 2024. In early 2024, Makonnen worked on the Walters Art Museum's exhibition Ethiopia at the Crossroads as a guest curator; her installation "Senait & Nahom" was also included in the exhibition.

The Smithsonian’s National Museum of African Art held an exhibition of Makonnen's works in late 2024. Makonnen was also included in the Albuquerque Museum's Broken Boxes exhibition that year.

=== Awards ===
- Connecting Communities Digital Initiative Award, Fall 2024

=== Exhibitions ===
==== Group ====
- A Muffled Sound Underwater, Latchkey Gallery, New York City, 2020
- Addis Fine Art, Art Dubai, 2021
- Migrations and Meaning(s) in Art, Meyerhoff Gallery, Baltimore
- Africa & Byzantium, Metropolitan Museum of Art, New York City, 2023-2024
- Ethiopia at the Crossroads, Walters Art Museum, 2024
- Broken Boxes: A Decade of Art, Action, and Dialogue, Albuquerque Museum, 2024

==== Solo ====
- Tsedaye Makonnen—Sanctuary :: መቅደስ :: Mekdes, National Museum of African Art, Smithsonian Institution, 2024

== Personal life ==
Makonnen was born in Washington, D.C. to Ethiopian immigrant parents and raised in Silver Spring, Maryland. She worked at the Shaw Community Center for three years and as a doula at D.C. nonprofit with Mamatoto Village for four years. She has a son, who was born in the early 2010s.
