= Oikonomos (disambiguation) =

Oikonomos was a household manager in Ancient Greece, or a treasurer of an organization. It may also refer to:

- The etymology of the word economy
- Oikonomos Tsaritsani F.C., a Greek football club
- Oikonomos (Chagas), a photograph series by Edson Chagas
