= Artists Alliance =

Defunct non-profit organisation in New Zealand

Artists Alliance is a defunct non-profit organisation that was based in Ponsonby in Auckland, New Zealand. Artists Alliance provided information, resources, career advice, networks, and advocacy for the visual artists of Aotearoa/New Zealand. Artists Alliance was also part of WeCreate (the copyright coalition of New Zealand) and the Creative Coalition based in Auckland. Artists Alliance received funding from ASB Community Trust, Foundation North, Chartwell Trust, Patillo, Auckland Council, Creative New Zealand, and Pub Charity. They also received income from their members and other stakeholders.

== History ==
Artists Alliance was established in 1991 as an offshoot of the New Zealand Sculptors Society. The non-profit's goal was to advance the interests of New Zealand's visual arts community as well as to offer individual support to artists within that community. Artist's Alliance was closed down in late 2018 due to being denied funding from Creative New Zealand.

== Programmes ==
=== Internships ===
Artists Alliance has placed interns within several organisations throughout New Zealand such as: Artists Alliance itself, Creative Coalition, Artspace, Auckland Arts Festival, The Physics Room, Centre of Contemporary Art and the Gus Fisher Gallery.

=== Mentoring ===
Each year, Artists Alliance released applications for artists desiring to be mentees; mentors are assigned to the mentees based on factors such as artistic focus and goals. Some of the mentors who participate or have participated in this program include: Anthony Byrt, Phil Dadson, Glen Hayward, Janet Lilo, Jeremy Leatinu’u, Peter Madden, Luke Munn, Emil McAvoy, and Niki Hastings-McFall.

=== Volunteering ===
Artists Alliance started a volunteer programme primarily for current students in tertiary art institutions studying art, design or art history, as well as recent graduates from these degrees. Volunteers work with regional galleries, non-profit galleries/initiatives, dealer galleries and event organisers to broaden their knowledge and build working relationships within the arts community.

=== Artist in Residence ===
The Artists Alliance fundraised to support an artist in residence for a six-week period. The artist in residence was guaranteed studio space at the Ponsonby office as well as the stipend of money fundraised to spend as he or she wished. Participants were Jessica Pearless, Tiffany Rewa Newick and Corrina Hoseason.

=== Resources ===
- Blog— In 1991, Artists Alliance began publishing a quarterly magazine about the visual arts. After printing of this magazine ceased it was succeeded by the Artists Alliance Blog.
- The Code of Practice for Artists and Dealers —Published in 2005, the Code of Practice for Artists and Dealers was designed to lay out a framework for arrangements between artists and dealers.
- Dr. Paynt – A series of articles written by chairman of the board Evan Woodruffe advising artists on various issues.

== Leadership and membership ==
- Maggie Gresson
- Board
  - Evan Woodruffe, chairman of the board
  - Alix Bachmann
  - Scott Gardiner
  - Linda Lew
  - Caroline Stone
  - Amy Potenger
  - Tracey Tawhiao
