= Murray Boren =

American classical composer

Murray Boren (born 1950) is a composer of opera, symphonic, chamber, and vocal works. He has written nine operas and over 100 songs and chamber compositions. He also contributed to the Joseph Sonnets. Among his operas are Book of Gold and Emma; both are based on the Church of Jesus Christ of Latter-day Saints (LDS Church) history. In 2007, he retired from his position as composer-in-residence at the College of Music of the College of Fine Arts and Communications of Brigham Young University (BYU).

== Education and career ==
Murray Boren received his BM and MA in composition from Brigham Young University (BYU) in 1975 and 1977 respectively. He received a DMA in composition from the City University of New York in 2002. Boren began his academic career as department head at the College of Education in Uyo, Nigeria, from 1970 to 1980. He became a professor of composition and theory at BYU in 1980, a position he held for four years. After this, he worked in administrative positions at the City University of New York and New York University from 1984 to 1994. He returned to teach composition and theory at BYU in 1994 where he served as composer in residence until he retired in 2007.

Boren has written nine operas, adapting them from religious texts and LDS Church history, as well as medieval mystery plays. Orson Scott Card was the librettist for Boren's opera Abraham and Isaac based on Genesis 22 in the Bible. Boren wrote the opera Emma about Emma Smith, wife of the founder of the LDS Church, Joseph Smith. Emma received mixed reviews. It was praised for its freshness, but criticized for being overly chromatic. Allan Kozinn of The New York Times praised the vocal performances and the unique orchestral music; however, he criticized the opera's slow pace stating that, "the sustained slow-motion caterwauling of the first five minutes was ample warning that this would be a very, very long evening." Boren has collaborated with librettist Glen Nelson on three operas. The Dead was a one-act opera adaptation of James Joyce's Dubliners, first staged in New York in 1993. They also collaborated on The Singer's Romance, a three-act opera inspired by a Willa Cather short story. In 2005, Boren and Nelson collaborated to create The Book of Gold, an opera about Joseph Smith. In addition to opera, Boren has written over 100 songs and chamber compositions. He wrote the music for the Joseph Sonnets, which were created in co-operation with Sally Taylor. Several of Boren's pieces were first performed by orchestras directed by Kory Katseanes.

Boren is a member of the Church of Jesus Christ of Latter-day Satins and is married to Susan Alexander Boren, a soprano with whom he has performed. They have three children.

== Operas ==
- The Only Jealousy of Emer (1973)
- Abraham & Isaac (1977)
- A Christmas Play (1982)
- Emma (1983)
- Mormon/Moroni (1987)
- The Dead (1993)
- The Singer's Romance (1998)
- Eliza (2004)
- The Book of Gold (2005)
