= Edson Chagas =

Angolan photographer (born 1977)

- Born: 1977 (age 47–48); Luanda, Angola
- Occupation: Photographer

Edson Chagas (born 1977) is an Angolan photographer. Trained as a photojournalist, his works explore cities and consumerism. His Found Not Taken series resituates abandoned objects elsewhere within cities. His other large-format photograph series play on tropes related to African masks. Oikonomos consists of self-portraits of Chagas with shopping bags over his head as symbols of consumerism in Luanda, his home city. The passport-style photographs of Tipo Passe show models wearing nondescript, contemporary clothes and traditional African masks.

Chagas represented Angola at the 2013 Venice Biennale, for which he won its Golden Lion for best national pavilion. His works have also exhibited at the Museum of Modern Art, Tate Modern, and Brooklyn Museum.

== Early life ==
Edson Chagas was born in Luanda, Angola, in 1977. His father studied aeronautics and his mother worked at a supermarket. Chagas and his brother were raised in Maianga, where his immediate family continues to live. He lived through the Angolan Civil War and recalled the need to be resourceful due to scarcity of goods. His father sent him and his brother to Portugal for safety during the war, where they moved several times. Chagas wanted to train as a cameraman but the class was focused on photography, not video. He began taking photos with his grandmother's compact camera and photography became a means for Chagas to understand himself, communicate, and stimulate thoughts about memories. Chagas moved to the United Kingdom and received a degree in photojournalism from the London College of Communication. He also studied documentary photography at the University of Wales, Newport. He said it took him many years to decide to professionalize as a photographer and began to transition from photojournalism to art photography in 2008.

== Career ==
Chagas has described his work as being interested how identity and consumerism are perceived in society. His series through 2014 show the ways in which bodies, objects, and identities live in urban spaces in-between the Global North and Global South.

In his Found Not Taken series, Chagas walks through cities to relocate and photograph commonplace objects in their urban settings. He started the series in 2008 while living in London and continued in other cities where he spent time: Newport, Wales, and Luanda, Angola. The series reflects the global waste in mass consumption and suggests a slower relationship with urban space. Scholar Ana Balona de Oliveira wrote that the lonely objects in the series are also biographical, showing the estrangement of being a diasporic immigrant among the anonymous commuters of London and Newport, and the lost familiarity of returning to the postwar changes in Luanda.

Chagas exhibited photographs from Found Not Taken to represent Angola at the country's first Venice Biennale national pavilion in 2013, curated by Paula Nascimento and Stephano Rabolli Pansera. His exhibition placed on the floor poster-sized photographs of discarded objects positioned in relation to weathered architecture in the Angolan capital, Luanda. These giveaway poster stacks were in "stark juxtaposition" with the opulent, Catholic decorations of the host, Palazzo Cini, which had been closed for the previous two decades. The New York Times called the pavilion a "breakout star" of the Biennale, and it won the biennial's top prize, the Golden Lion for best national pavilion. The curators had asked Chagas to display only the photographs from Luanda for the Biennale, which he found acceptable since it didn't take the series out of context.

His Oikonomos series (2011–2012) of large-format self-portraits with shopping bags over his head were intended to hide his identity behind symbols of globalized capitalism and secondhand consumerism in Luanda as secondhand goods permeate African consumer culture. This series was later shown at the Brooklyn Museum's 2016 Disguise: Masks and Global African Art exhibition. Hyperallergic highlighted the performativity in the artist wearing a Barack Obama bag over his head as kitschy, funny, and like another persona.

Tipo Passe (2012–2014) is a large-scale portrait photograph series depicting models dressed in nondescript, contemporary attire contrasting with traditional African masks. The clothes came from street markets and import retailers, while the masks came from a private collection. The prints were made in editions of seven. He showed selections at exhibitions at the Paris Photo fair (2014), the Montreal Museum of Fine Arts (2018), and the Tate Modern (2023).

Selections across these series also showed at the Museum of Modern Art's Ocean of Images: New Photography 2015 contemporary photography exhibition and the 2016 1:54 art fair.

In 2017 and 2018, Chagas captured photographs of the abandoned Fábrica Irmãos Carneiro textile factory in Luanda, which he showed in Lisbon in 2022. The interior photos show textured close-ups of its abandoned machines, cobwebs, dust, and rust. Others show the degradation of furniture, wall paint, and the building's facade.

Chagas continues to live in Luanda as of 2017. He works as the image editor for Expansão, an Angolan newspaper, as of 2015.

== Selected exhibitions ==
Solo

- Angolan pavilion, 55th Venice Biennale, 2013
- Factory of Disposable Feelings, Hangar – Centro de Investigação Artística, Lisbon, 2022

Group

- Ocean of Images: New Photography 2015, Museum of Modern Art, New York, 2015
- The Divine Comedy: Heaven, Purgatory and Hell Revisited by Contemporary African Artists, Smithsonian National Museum of African Art, Washington, D.C., 2016
- From Africa to the Americas: Face-To-Face Picasso, Past and Present, Montreal Museum of Fine Arts, Montreal, 2018
- A World in Common: Contemporary African Photography, Tate Modern, London, 2023

== Bibliography ==
- Moses, Serubiri (2024). "Edson Chagas' Photographic Realism". The Routledge Companion to African Diaspora Art History. Routledge. pp. 549–559. ISBN 978-1-003-29512-9.
- Oliveira, Ana Balona de (2017). "Journal of Uncollectable Journeys: Edson Chagas's Found Not Taken Series and Other Works". Nka Journal of Contemporary African Art (40): 44–55. doi:10.1215/10757163-3885929. ISSN 1075-7163.
