= Beyond Entropy =

British non-profit architecture company

Beyond Entropy was a London-based non-profit limited company practicing architecture, urbanism, and cultural analysis. The company evolved from trans-disciplinary research at the Architectural Association School of Architecture, in London. The company was founded by Stefano Rabolli Pansera in 2009 as a collaborative practice operating public-private partnerships globally, and was dissolved in 2024. Beyond Entropy Ltd operated at the threshold between art, architecture, and geopolitics focusing on the notion of energy influencing form. Projects varied from art installations, to architectural master-planning, to public relations.

== Territories ==
From 2012, Beyond Entropy operated globally in situations of territorial crisis. Beyond Entropy defined several regions of investigations: each region was analysed through a set of territorial problems that could be understood within the dialectics of energy and form, transformation and resistance, energy and entropy, matter and action.

Beyond Entropy is worked in the urban sprawl of some of the most industrialized parts of the planet (Beyond Entropy Europe); in the derelict infrastructures of deserted islands and coastline of the Mediterranean (Beyond Entropy Mediterranean); the overcrowded urban areas of the cities in emerging countries (Beyond Entropy Africa). Furthermore Beyond Entropy created a Publishing House (Beyond Entropy Publication) and a Radio (Beyond Entropy Radio).

=== Beyond Entropy Africa ===
In 2011, Stefano Rabolli Pansera and Paula Nascimento founded Beyond Entropy Africa, a limited company registered in Angola. Beyond Entropy Africa focused on Luanda as the paradigm of the urban condition of the African Sub-Saharan region, a type of city that is defined by a lack of basic infrastructures and a high population density.

In 2012, Beyond Entropy Africa curated the Angola Pavilion at the 13th Architecture Biennale in Venice entitled ‘Beyond Entropy Angola’.

In 2013, Beyond Entropy Africa curated the Angola Pavilion at the 55th Art Biennale in Venice entitled ‘Luanda, Encyclopedic City’ featuring the work of photographer Chagas. The Pavilion received the Golden Lion for Best National Participation.

=== Beyond Entropy Mediterranean ===
Beyond Entropy Mediterranean focused on Sardinia as the paradigm of the Mediterranean Coastline, a region where irreconcilable territorial conditions coexist: natural reserve and touristic exploitation, large infrastructures and unspoiled islands, overcrowded coastlines during summer and deserted villages during winter. Beyond Entropy Mediterranean focused on the proposal of a Mediterranean Kunsthalle articulated around the Museum of Contemporary Art of Calasetta and the Open Air Gallery of Mangiabarche.

=== Beyond Entropy Europe ===
Beyond Entropy Europe looked at the urban sprawl of Northern Italy as the privileged example of a condition where city and countryside are blurred into an entropic landscape. Through the systematic study of Palladian Villas as territorial catalysts, Beyond Entropy envisioned a new form of occupation for this contemporary landscape.

== Awards ==
Golden Lion of the Venice Biennale of Art for the Best National Participation (Angola Pavilion) 2013.
