= The Mosque =

2015 art installation

The Mosque was an art installation by Christoph Büchel at the 2015 Venice Biennale. Hosted by the Icelandic pavilion, the artist opened a functioning mosque within a disused church in Venice to bring attention to the lack of historic mosque in the city. Amidst the ensuing controversy, the installation was shut down in the interest of public safety.

== Bibliography ==
- Baumgardner, Julie (June 2, 2015). "What's Been Missed in the Heated Debate around Christoph Büchel's Venice Biennale Mosque". Artsy.
- Greenberger, Alex (August 18, 2020). "The Top 10 Venice Biennale Controversies: Censorship, Fake Art, Financial Strife, and More". ARTnews.com.
- Kennedy, Randy (May 22, 2015). "Police Shut Down Mosque Installation at Venice Biennale". The New York Times. ISSN 0362-4331.
- Muñoz-Alonso, Lorena (May 7, 2015). "Mosque Opens in Venice despite Police Warning". Artnet News.
- Russeth, Andrew (April 30, 2015). "Swiss Artist Christoph Büchel, Repping Iceland in Venice, Will Stage Artwork Called 'The Mosque' at Disused Church". ARTnews.com.
- Russeth, Andrew (May 8, 2015). "Breaking the Mystique of the Mosque: Christoph Büchel's Icelandic Pavilion Opens". ARTnews.com.
- Russeth, Andrew (May 27, 2015). "Reopen Christoph Büchel's Mosque Project in Venice". ARTnews.com.
- Vartanian, Hrag (May 22, 2015). "Why I Don't Buy the Premise of Christoph Büchel's Icelandic Mosque Pavilion". Hyperallergic.
