= Kory Katseanes =

Kory Katseanes is a Professor of Music and the Director of Orchestras at the BYU School of Music and was the director of the School of Music from 2009-2015. Brigham Young University (BYU) The orchestra program at BYU is one of the largest collegiate orchestra programs in the United States. He has also been a guest conductor for multiple orchestras.

Katseanes grew up in Blackfoot, Idaho. He is a member of the Church of Jesus Christ of Latter-day Saints (LDS Church) and served as a missionary in Switzerland from 1971-73.Missionary (LDS Church)

Katseanes first studied music at Ricks College and continued on to the University of Utah where he received a Bachelor's degree and Master's degree in violin performance.

Katseanes joined the Utah Symphony as a violinist in 1975 and later became its assistant conductor from 1987-2002. He regularly conducted the Symphony on the Entertainment, Youth, and Family Series, at Deer Valley, Abravanel Hall, and at numerous venues locally, throughout Utah, and the surrounding Western States. Katseanes was also the founder and music director of the professional chamber orchestra, The Utah Virtuosi.

In 1999 he joined the faculty at BYU, and conducts the BYU Philharmonic and BYU Chamber Orchestras at BYU and oversees the operations of the other three orchestras at the university, approximately 450 students all together. Katseanes is also the director of BYU's graduate orchestra conducting program.

In 2021 Katseanes was one of three recipients of BYU's Karl G. Maeser Excellence in Teaching award given to faculty.

Under Katseanes direction the BYU Philharmonic orchestra has also been nominated to receive a Pearl Award.

Katseanes has been a frequent guest conductor and clinician appearing with the Utah Symphony, Ballet West, the Mormon Tabernacle Choir and Orchestra, and community orchestras throughout the West. He has worked with All-State orchestras in Arizona, Florida, Idaho, Illinois, Kentucky, New Hampshire, Tennessee, Utah, and Wyoming. .

Katseanes conducted the BYU orchestra for the premiere production of Glen Nelson and Murray Boren's The Book of Gold. Nelson is a BYU and NYU graduate who works as a ghost writer in New York City.

Katseanes was one of the original members of the College Orchestra Directors Association when it was formed in 2003. In 2008 the CODA National Conference was held at BYU. At the conference Katseanes directed the BYU Philharmonic orchestra in the premier performance of Libby Larsen's "Bach 358".

For years, Katseanes lived in the Avenues area of Salt Lake City with his wife, Carolyn and their four children. They have since moved to Provo, UT.

== Sources ==
- BYU biography
