= ENSA – Seguros de Angola =

ENSA – Seguros de Angola S.A.
- Formerly: Empresa Nacional de Seguros e Resseguros de Angola
- Industry: Insurance; reinsurance
- Founded: 1978; 48 years ago
- Headquarters: Angola
- Number of locations: 30 branch offices; 54 post office sales locations; 1 bank sales location
- Number of employees: Approx. 700
- Subsidiaries: ENSA S.A.; ENSA RE SA
- Website: ensa.co.ao

ENSA – Seguros de Angola S.A. is the main insurance company in Angola.

== History ==
ENSA was created in 1978 as Empresa Nacional de Seguros e Resseguros de Angola as (U.E.E.; Unidade Economica Estatal), and was later converted into a joint-stock company.

In May 2013, the Standard Chartered bank entered a 60/40 partnership with the ENSA to develop its activities in Angola. In August 2019, the Angolan government announced the privatization of approximately 195 state companies, including the ENSA, a move that had already been announced in 2013.

== Structure ==
The firm employs 700 people. ENSA works through 30 branch offices of its own, and sells its services at 54 post offices and one bank.

ENSA manages two companies:

- ENSA S.A., an insurance company
- ENSA RE SA, a reinsurance company

ENSA claims to hold more than 50% of the Angolan insurance market. In December 2018, ENSA held 38% of the insurance market shares in Angola.
