= Luanda Lozano =

Angolan and Dominican printmaker (born 1973)

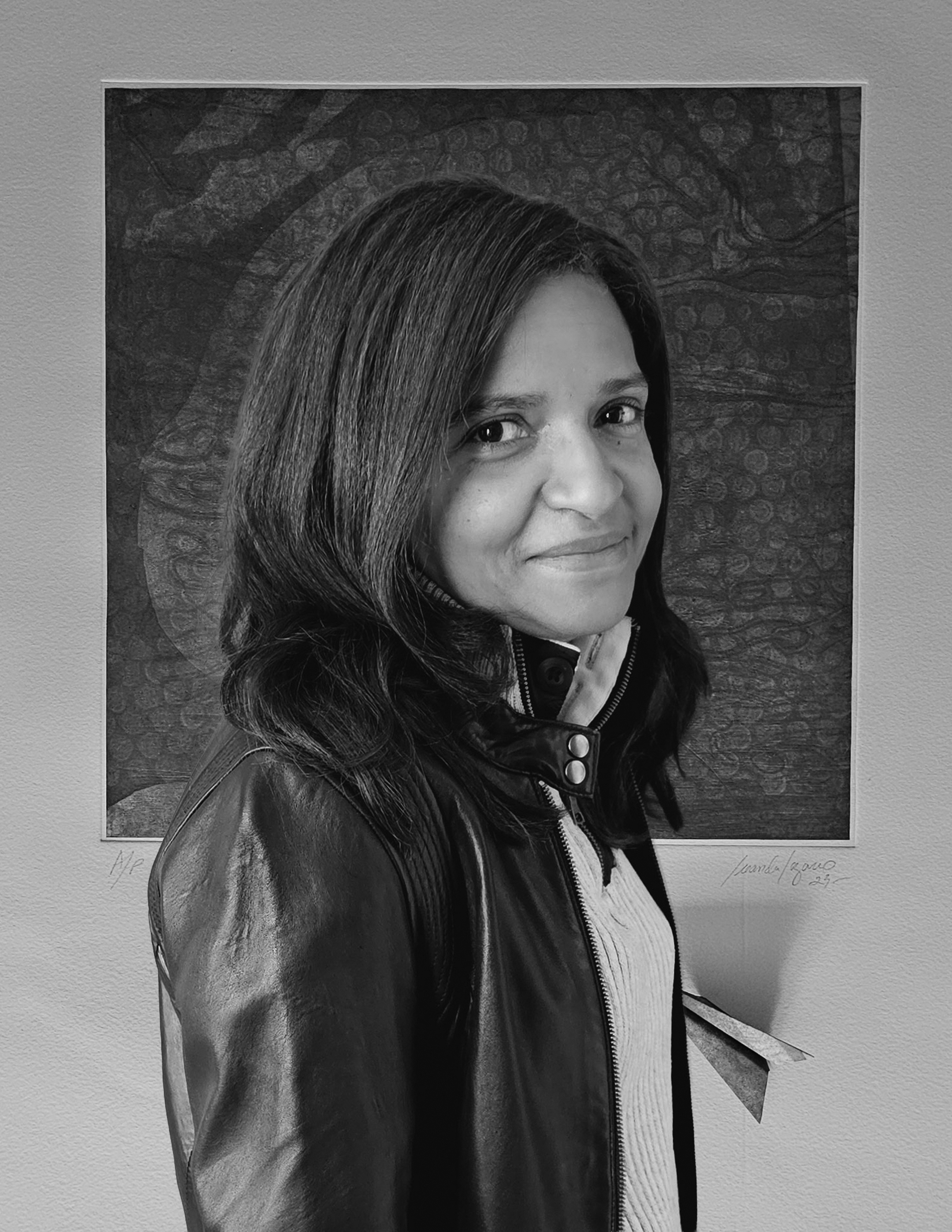
- Born: 1973 (age 52–53); Humpata, Angola
- Education: Altos de Chavón School of Design (AAS); Parsons School of Design (BFA)
- Known for: Visual artist, printmaker
- Awards: 12th International Biennial (Medal of Honor)
- Website: luandalozano.com

Luanda Lozano (born 1973) is an Angolan and Dominican printmaker and visual artist, who works with abstract and organic forms. Lozano is an Afro-Latina artist living in New York City.

== Early life and education ==
Lozano was born in 1973, in Humpata, Angola, and grew up in San Francisco de Macoris in Duarte, Dominican Republic. She started painting at thirteen years old and made her first etched print at fifteen years old. She attended Altos de Chavón School of Design, an art school in the Dominican Republic. After earning a fine arts associate degree, Lozano continued her education at Parsons School of Design and received a B.F.A. degree in illustration (1994).

== Work ==
In 1992, Lozano started to work in the Robert Blackburn Printmaking Workshop. Her relationship with Robert Blackburn was a source of artistic inspiration for her career and work. By the late 1990s, she simultaneously worked with the Manhattan Graphics Center, and by 2010, she co-founded the print collective Dominican York Proyecto Grafica. She then dedicated her time to as an educator at the Bronx River Art Center and for over more than a decade has taught drawing and printmaking.

Lozano's artwork includes themes from childhood and Caribbean and Afro-Latina cultures. She focuses on expressing personal experiences based on abstracted memory. Some of her works include religious iconography such as Catholic saints.

As a printmaker, Lozano approaches her work as a collage of techniques. Some of the most common techniques she uses in her prints range from etching, collography and drypoint techniques.

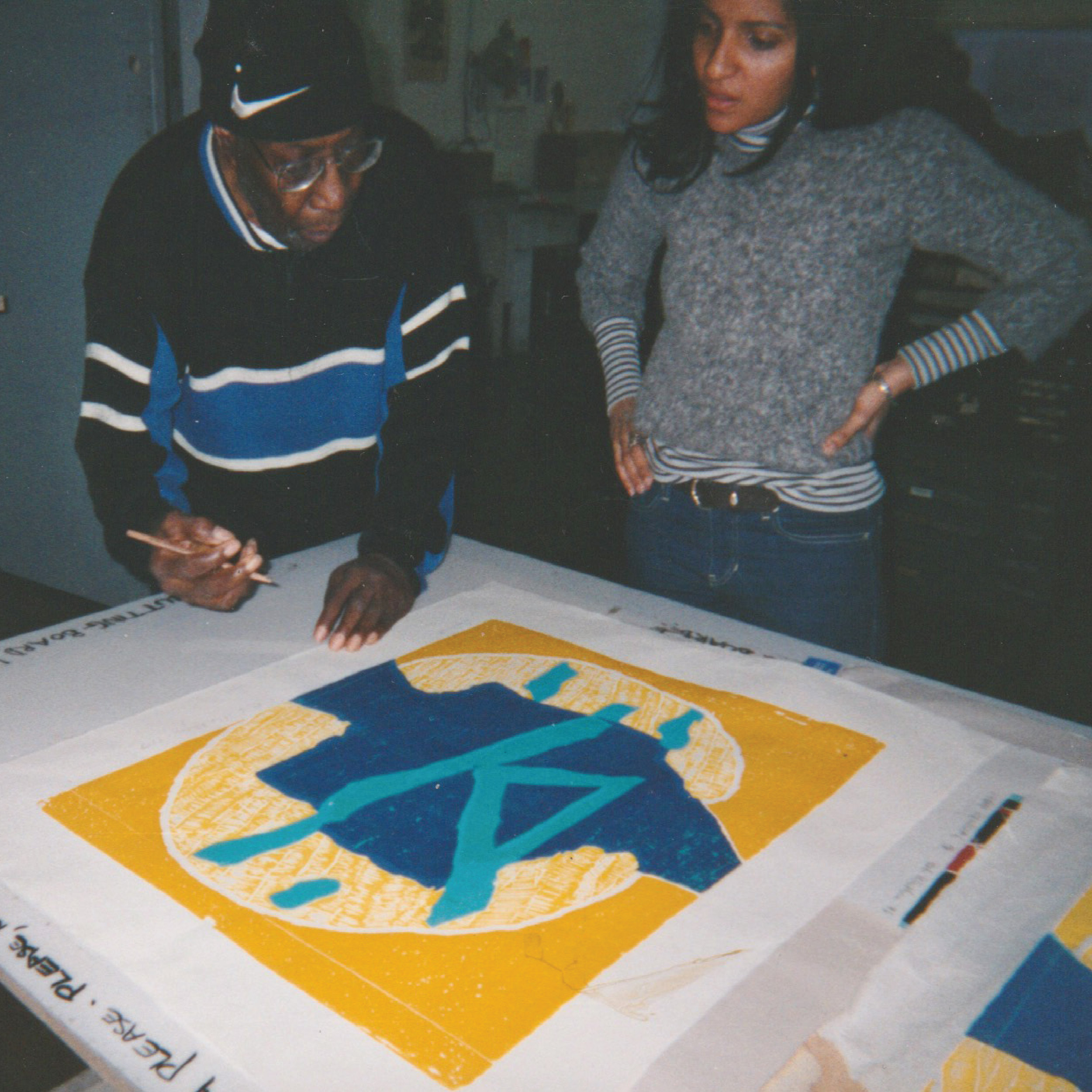
Master printer Robert Blackburn and Luanda Lozano at the Printmaking Workshop (PMW). Year: 2000.

In 1998, Lozano was selected to represent the Dominican Republic at the XII Bienal de San Juan del Grabado Latinoamericano y del Caribe. Recently awarded the 2023 Center for Contemporary Prints Binnie Birthstien Memorial Award and the 2024 Southern Graphics Council International (SGCI) Mid-Career Printmaker Award. Luanda was invited to be one of the panel members for the 2025 Emerging Printmaker Award also hosted by the Southern Graphics Council International.

== Collections ==
Luanda's artistic work has been included in public collections, such as the Smithsonian American Art Museum, Washington, D.C.; the Metropolitan Museum of Art, New York City; the Hood Museum of Art, Dartmouth College, Hanover, New Hampshire; the Museo Nacional del Grabado, Argentina;Varna Museum, Bulgaria; Chamalière Museum, Auvergne, France; Montclair Museum (PMW Portfolio 2000) New Jersey; Library of Congress (Robert Blackburn print collection), Washington D.C.; Tellus Art, Sweden; Taiwan Museum of Art, Taiwan; Florean Museum and InterArt Foundation, Romania; CUNY Dominican Studies Institute, The City College of New York; Hudson County Community College, Jersey City, New Jersey; Mexic-Arte Museum, Austin, Texas; Blanton Museum; Brandywine Workshop & Archives, Philadelphia, PA; Colby College Museum of Art, Waterville, ME; and Kathy Caraccio Fine Art Print Collection.

== See also ==
- Afro-Dominicans
