= 55th Venice Biennale =

2013 edition of the art exhibition

- Genre: Art exhibition
- Begins: 2013
- Ends: 2013
- Location: Venice
- Country: Italy
- Previous event: 54th Venice Biennale (2011)
- Next event: 56th Venice Biennale (2015)

The 55th Venice Biennale was an international contemporary art exhibition held in 2013. The Venice Biennale takes place biennially in Venice, Italy. Artistic director Massimiliano Gioni curated its central exhibition, "The Encyclopedic Palace".

== Awards ==
- Golden Lion for best artist of the exhibition: Tino Sehgal
- Silver Lion for the most promising young artist of main exhibition: Camille Henrot
- Golden Lions for lifetime achievement: Marisa Merz and Maria Lassnig
- Golden Lion for best national participation: Angolan pavilion

== Reception ==
ARTnews later named the Biennale among the decade's best shows and praised, in particular, Gioni's central exhibition for displaying self-taught artists alongside major artists.
