= Barca Nostra =

Art project by Christoph Büchel at the 2019 Venice Biennale

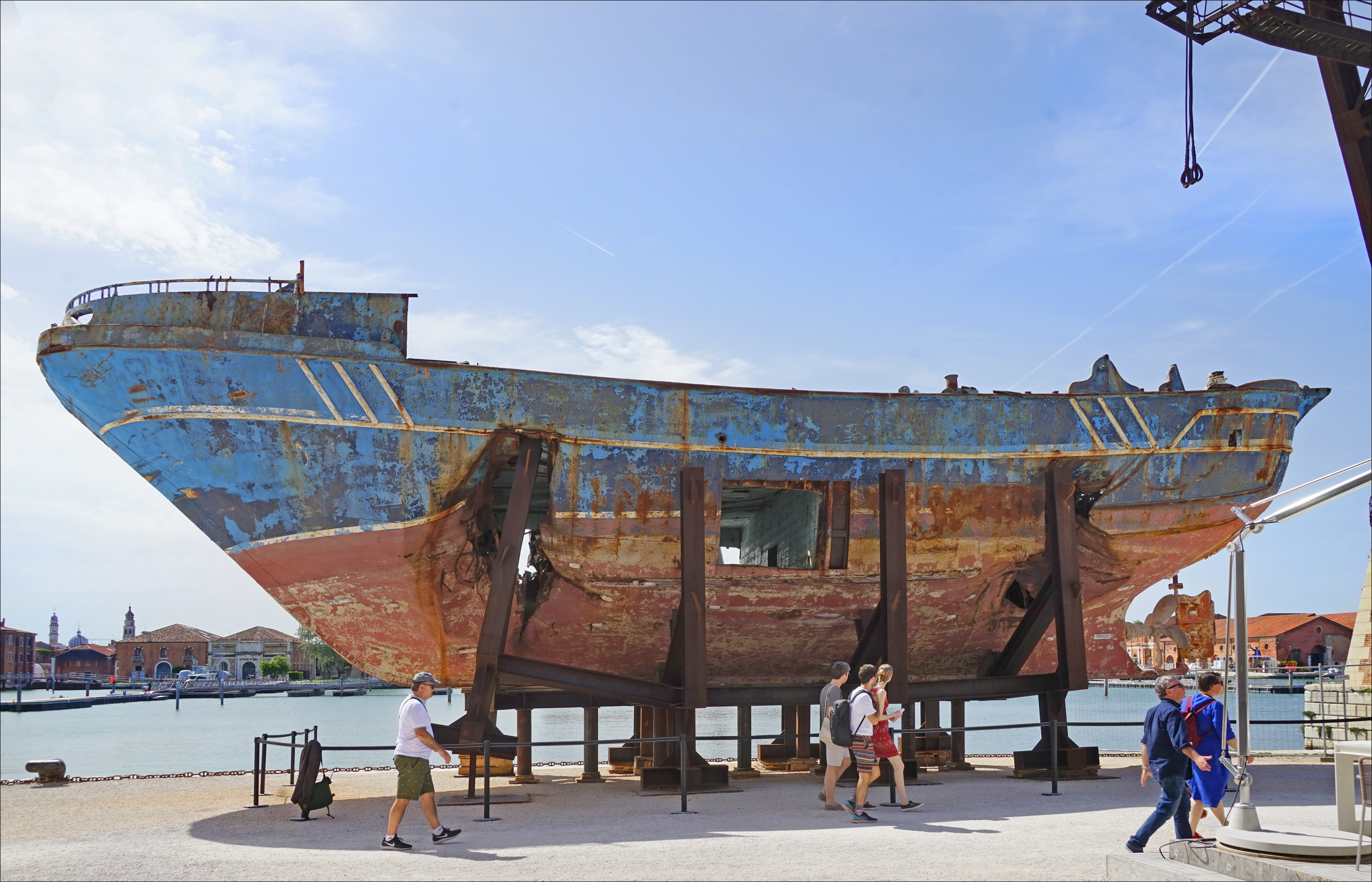

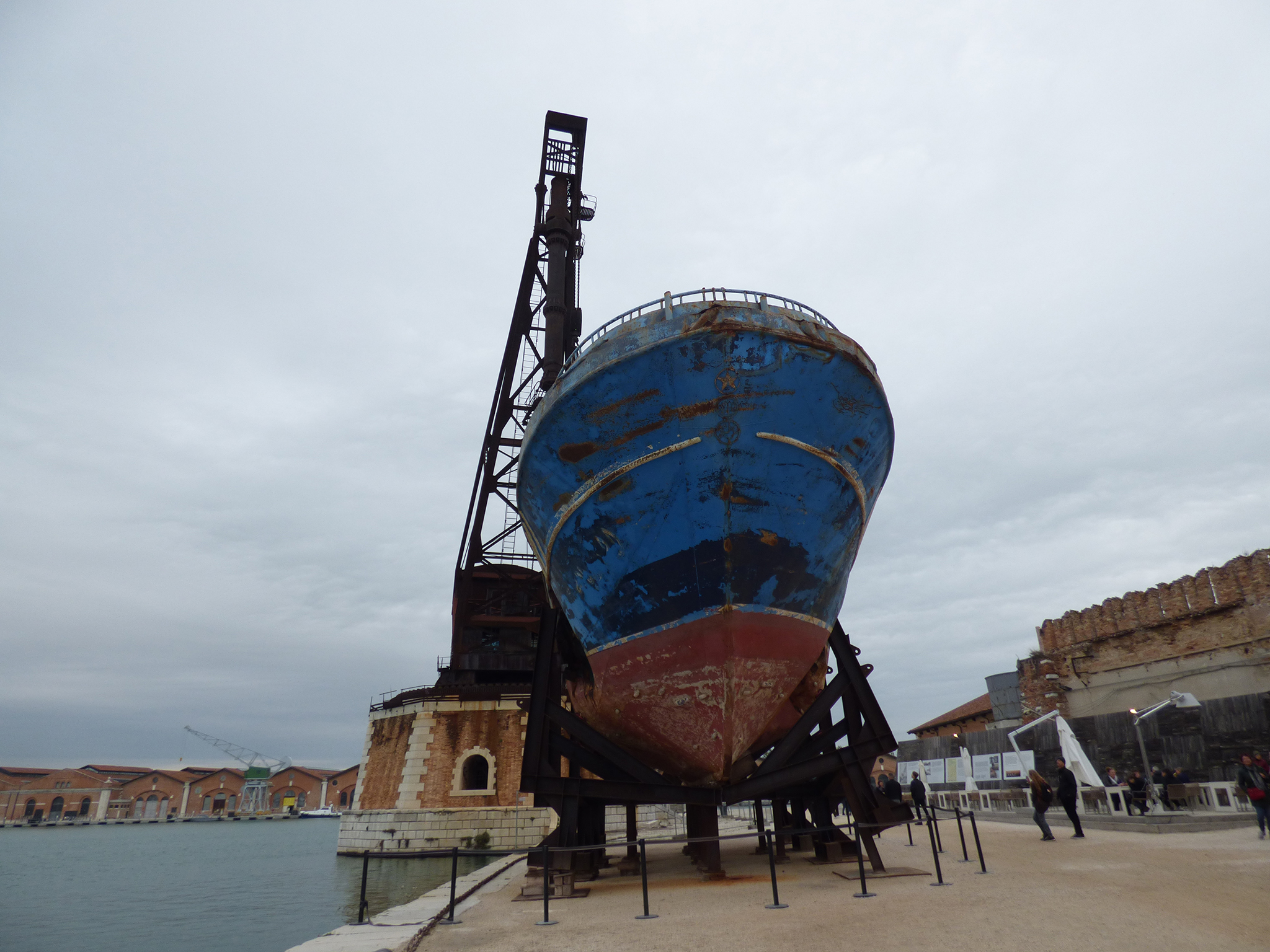

Barca Nostra ("Our Boat") was a project by Swiss–Icelandic artist Christoph Büchel that displayed at the 2019 Venice Biennale the wreckage of a fishing boat that had sunk with hundreds of migrants aboard. It was among the art world's top stories of the year.

== Description ==
Barca Nostra was a hoisted shipwreck presented at the 2019 Venice Biennale.

The fishing vessel sank on April 18, 2015 after a tragic collision with a Portuguese container ship that had come to its rescue. The Italian Navy estimates that more than 800 migrants died on the vessel, trapped inside its hull. Just twenty-eight people were saved.

Four years after the tragic shipwreck, the boat was released on April 18, 2019, destined for Venice. For the duration of the 58th La Biennale di Venezia, the ship was bearing witness to the thousands who have died attempting to cross the Mediterranean.

== Reception ==
The project was included among 2019's art world top stories.

"It is a very important project, that boat is the symbol both of the human tragedy and of the political crisis that the migrant flow is causing to all of Europe", Giovanni Angileri, chief of staff of the Sicilian cultural heritage department, told CNN.

Barca Nostra was called "a monument to contemporary migration" and a symbol of human tragedy that brings our collective responsibility into focus.

Carlotta Sami, a spokeswoman for the United Nations’ refugee agency visited the boat and said: “I feel this cannot be considered a relic of the past. Today, a new shipwreck is telling us that that boat is our present.”

The artwork has prompted critics for not providing any signage. Matthew Collings concluded "the work could not be more on the nail" since "people not knowing or caring about what is right in front of them, a thing they could in fact quite easily investigate, is surely the whole problem of the migrant crisis. It is the reason it remains a crisis."

More than any artwork in the exhibition, by rendering visible what is generally hidden from public view, its presence encapsulates the danger, tragedy and trauma of forced migration.
