= Tracey Tawhiao =

New Zealand artist

- Born: 1967 (age 58–59)
- Known for: Poetry, Painting, Performance, Film making.

Tracey Tawhiao (born 1967) is a New Zealand artist. Her ancestry can be traced to Ngāi Te Rangi, Whakatohea, Tuwharetoa.

== Life ==
Tawhiao is a prolific artist with a wide range of creative expression including poetry, painting, performance and film making. She is well known for using newspaper as the basis of her practise, obscuring passages of text with block colours and Māori symbols and motifs, whilst highlighting short headlines or individual words. Tawhiao's artistic practise arose from time spent with her grandparents at their Matakana Island home. The walls were covered in newspapers and Tawhiao's idea to brighten the place up was to apply symbols and images directly to the walls. This close connection to the text highlighted to her the negativity implicit in the headlines.

== Education ==
Tawhiao graduated with a Bachelor of Arts (BA) Classical Studies Major; Otago University, Dunedin and also a Bachelor of Laws (LLB) Otago University and Auckland University. Master of Philosophy (MPhil) Auckland University of Technology (AUT)

== Works ==
Tawhiao was asked to create work to enhance the exterior of the Hotel Britomart whilst under construction. This was the first to feature in the series 'Works on Paper'. She says of her work "The newspaper is putting a version of the news out to us, and I’m really colonising the page and reappropriating the page and making the new news."

Tawhiao's work is informed by the experience of Māori in a colonised world. She has been heavily influenced by the juxtaposition of living alongside her grandparents and their way of life on Matakana Island to the demands and 'chaos of contemporary living' outside that setting.

Her practise has taken her overseas with installations in Paris, Los Angeles and Taipei. Her work is held in the collection of the Museum of New Zealand Te Papa Tongarewa.

In 2022, Tawhiao used a $74,850 grant from Creative New Zealand to create a piece titled "Missed Information", which was criticised for portraying anti-vaccination messages and COVID-19 misinformation.

=== Exhibitions ===
- Te Puna O Āio, the Temple of Potential, Masters Thesis and Exhibition. Auckland University of Technology 2018
- Waitangi Wahine, Hastings City Art Gallery 2016
- Waitangi Wahine, Expressions Whirinaki 2015
- New Zealand Women Artists: From Yesteryear to Today, Taupō Museum 2015
- Northern Skies Southern Stars, University of Cambridge Museum of Archaeology and Anthropology (CUMAA) 2006.
