= Brian Kershisnik =

American painter

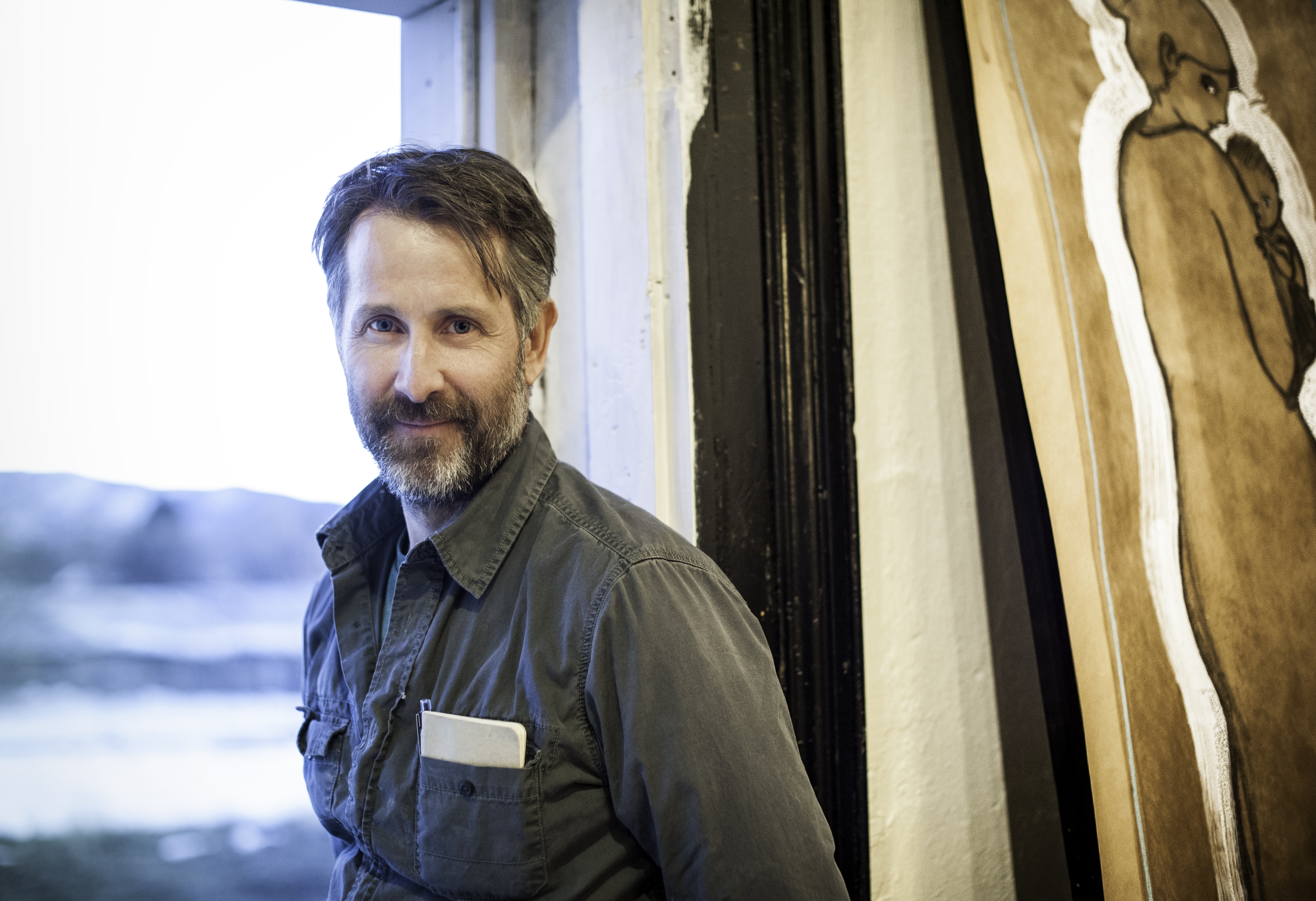
- Kershisnik in 2014
- Born: 1962 (age 63–64); Oklahoma City, Oklahoma, U.S.
- Education: B.F.A. Painting — Brigham Young University, M.F.A. Printmaking — The University of Texas at Austin

Brian Thomas Kershisnik (born 1962) is an American painter. He studied art at the University of Utah, Brigham Young University (BYU), and the University of Texas at Austin. He lives in Salt Lake City, Utah.

One art professor described his style as primitive-realist, and his paintings have a dream-like quality that is focused on idealized human figures. His notable works include a portrait of Leslie Norris, Nativity, and She Will Find What Was Lost. Kershisnik often begins with sketch or title, transforming his ideas into paintings. His work is in the permanent collections of many institutions, including the Brigham Young University Museum of Art, The Church of Jesus Christ of Latter-day Saints, and the Covey Center for the Arts.

== Early life and education ==
Kershisnik was born in July 1962 in Oklahoma City. He is the youngest son of four children and grew up both in the United States and internationally. His father worked as a petroleum geologist, moving internationally with his work. The family lived in various locations around the world, including Angola, Thailand, and Pakistan. He spent his childhood summers in Rock Springs, Wyoming, visiting his grandparents.

After graduating high school from the International School of Islamabad, Kershisnik attended the University of Utah intending to study architecture. After a year, he left to serve a mission for The Church of Jesus Christ of Latter-day Saints in Denmark. He transferred to BYU where he studied art and eventually focused on painting. During his undergraduate studies, he received a grant to study in London for six months. He received his Bachelor of Arts (BA) from BYU in 1988, after which he studied printmaking at the University of Texas at Austin where he received a Master of Fine Arts (MFA) in 1991. Upon the completion of his master's degree, he and his family moved to Kanosh, Utah.

== Process and style ==
Kershisnik is one of the best-known contemporary Utah artists, and his work relates the mundane to the divine. He has described his own style as "mythological autobiography," or a kind of "emotional self-portrait." His paintings often have whimsical or humorous subjects, and he paints in oil in a primitive-realist style, as described by Noel Carmack, an art professor at the Utah State University. Geoff Wichert, an art critic and frequent writer on Kershisnik, writes that Kershisnik's work deals mainly with the human figure as an ideal. The way his complex figures contrast with their unadorned settings gives his paintings a dreamlike quality. Flying is a common theme. Another way that Kershisnik abstracts his figures is by using the frontal eye on profile figures, as in Egyptian and Cubist paintings. He uses unusually large or small objects and textual inscriptions to heighten the otherworldly sense in his paintings. His works engage in a dialogue with religious ideas, showing human struggles and their consequences. Disheveled Saint depicts a scruffy man wearing a T-shirt, showing Kershisnik's belief that ordinary people can be holy. Burden on Wheels depicts two figures in white pushing a large object on wheels, which is pulled by a dark figure. The painting reflects the Christian idea that humans receive divine providence.

Kershisnik views art as way to "become more human." He uses a sketchbook to illustrate ideas, write down perspective concepts or aspects of a future painting. Often, his works will begin as a title and will illustrate the symbolism or the meaning behind those words. He usually works on numerous paintings at a time, having worked on as many as 100 pieces simultaneously. His approach to figure drawing "from [his] imagination rather than models." He is influenced by many artists, but specifically names Chagall, Degas, Modigliani, Klee, Giotto, and the artists that painted in the Lascaux caves. He sums up his artistic philosophy in the following statement:

There is great importance in successfully becoming human, in striving to fully understand others, ourselves, and God. The process is difficult and filled with awkward discoveries and happy encounters, dreadful sorrow, and unmitigated joy sometimes several at once. I believe art should facilitate this journey, rather than simply decorate it, or worse, distract us from it. It should remind us of what we have forgotten, illuminate what we know, or teach us new things. Through art we can come to feel and understand and love more completely—we become more human... I firmly believe that when a painting succeeds, I have not created it, but rather participated in it. I paint because I love, and because I love to paint. The better I become at both, the more readily accessed and identified is this grace, and the better will be my contribution.

== Works ==
Leslie Norris's neighbor asked Kershisnik to do a portrait of Norris. Kershisnik agreed to do it and give the neighbor the first chance to buy or refuse the painting. When the portrait was finished, the neighbor did not want to buy the painting, which Kershisnik then sold to the Utah Arts Council in 1994. Norris himself wanted to buy the painting afterwards, but the painting remains in custody of the Utah Arts Council.

Part of Kershisnik's Nativity

Nativity depicts the birth of Christ. Kershisnik painted Nativity in 2006 while he was a visiting professor at BYU. Kershisnik started the 17-foot-long (5.2 m) painting to create "something ambitious", after encouraging his students to do the same. The painting shows Mary nursing the baby Jesus, two midwives, Joseph, and a dog with her pups underneath a concourse of angels. Kershisnik said that his experiences of the births of his own children felt "densely witnessed" and inspired the painting. He also explained the iconography of the dog as a representation of fidelity and faithfulness, a common symbol in religious art. Bren Jackson, an art critic, wrote that the midwives exemplify the "fellowship of sisterhood" and Kershisnik adds that he would imagine that there would have been women there to help Mary. In the painting, Joseph is nearby, but separate from Mary and her child, and has an overwhelmed expression. The angels have distinct faces, which according to Jackson, invites viewers to consider what their role in observing the birth could have been. In an essay on Nativity, Jackson wrote that the way Mary puts her hand on Joseph's hand to comfort him even after she has just given birth reminds viewers of their humanity.

Part of She Will Find What Was Lost

She Will Find What Was Lost depicts many angels blessing and looking at a woman, who seems to some viewers to be unaware of their presence. It was on the cover of the February 2017 Ensign, and is on display in the LDS Conference Center as part of the LDS Church's collection. Viewers interpret the painting in different ways; some see it as depicting divine revelation and others see it as showing family history. Of the painting, Kershisnik wrote, "My intention for this piece was to speak to the most intensely private and intimate kind of supernatural interference, influence, and assistance... Many unseen forces are interested in you, love you, and work to influence matters for your profound benefit. Most of what we all do is resist it, misinterpret it, or mess it up, but my experience indicates that these unseen efforts persist impossibly. I thank God for that."

In Standing With Jesus on the Grass, a white-haired resurrected Jesus stands in profile, half-turned and looking toward the left. In the lower right-hand corner, a man and woman are visible from behind as they are oriented toward Christ, but with downturned gazes that signify their reverence for Christ. In an essay on the painting, Phillip and Delys Snyder, who own the painting and display it in their home, speculate that a face-to-face meeting is not depicted because it might be too sacred or personal to show in a painting. The use of "Standing" in the title, which is also written in the painting itself, shows a continuous action. The couple's ability to be present with Jesus shows that they are righteous, because a wicked person cannot "abide in the presence of the sacred." The word "stand" in the scriptures is often associated with becoming aware of God and Jesus's power. Even as the couple becomes aware of Jesus's power, they are standing with him in the same ordinary, grassy Earth.

== Criticism ==
In June 2017, the BYU Museum of Art opened the exhibition The Interpretation Thereof: Contemporary LDS Art and Scripture. Kershisnik's work, Descent From the Cross, is included in this exhibition, which Sean Rossiter criticized for depicting Christ too lightly, and as he argues, limiting the emotional weight of Crucifixion of Jesus. In 2011, Geoff Wichert criticised some of Kershisnik symbols as being esoteric and theologically specific. Writing for the Phoenix New Times, Tricia Parker commented that the people in his paintings are emotionally ambiguous because they are literally two-dimensional, but that this ambiguity makes them relatable.

== Permanent and long-term exhibitions and collections ==
Several institutions display Kershisnik's work permanently or on a long-term basis. These include the Beverly Taylor Sorenson Arts and Education Complex at the University of Utah, the BYU Museum of Art, the Springville Museum of Art, and the Covey Center for the Arts. The collections in Illinois State University and Ohio University also include some of his works.
