= Hildebrando de Melo =

Visual artist

Hildebrando de Melo (born 1978) is an Angolan visual artist. De Melo grew up in Portugal where he lived with his grandmother, converted to the Church of Jesus Christ of Latter-day Saints, and where he began art. He returned to Angola and pursued his art career. Throughout his career, he has displayed his artwork in multiple exhibits around the world. He has won awards for his art. He is largely self-taught and some of his artwork is politically motivated and includes paintings, drawings, sculptures and multi-media. His art is also personal to his life, with his experiences being the subject matter of many of his art pieces.

== Early education ==
Hildebrando de Melo was born in Bailundo, Angola, and spent his early childhood in Lobito. He is the grandson of King Ekuikui II of Bailundo, and his parents and grandparents worked in the Angolan government. At an early age, De Melo had a desire to be politically active instilled inside him. When he was five years old, he moved to Porto, Portugal, to live with his grandmother Laura de Melo. Though the move was intended to be temporary (de Melo was sick and his parents believed his situation would be better in Portugal), he remained in Portugal after his recovery. While growing up in Portugal, de Melo enjoyed playing at the beach, in the forests, and watching American films. Hildebrando de Melo converted to the Church of Jesus Christ of Latter-day Saints at age 14, when his grandmother joined the same church. After his grandmother's death, de Melo's aunt and uncle moved to a small town and sent him to work in a factory. When he was 11 or 12, an art teacher gave him advanced lessons in painting and taught him about modern art. It was not until he turned 18 in 1996, that de Melo returned to his birth family in Angola, some of which he had not yet met. His art techniques are mostly self-taught.

== Returning to Angola ==
De Melo was anxious to return to his family in Angola and get to know them better, but it did not come without its difficulties. Though his community in Angola spoke fluent Portuguese, it was not the same Portuguese de Melo grew up speaking, nor did he remember the language of his Mbundu people. Angola was also different from what de Melo remembered: due to their civil war that began three years before de Melo was born and would not end until 2002, the country was in constant flux. However, de Melo was celebrated for having returned to Angola at such a turbulent time when he had the option to remain in Europe. De Melo decided in his early 20s that he wanted to become a professional artist. He initially received some pushback from his father who hoped Hildebrando would choose a different career, but that would change and Hildebrando would receive his father’s support. He currently lives in Angola with his wife Maria and their kids.

== Artistic influences and process ==
De Melo’s art is very personal. He said, “Everything I have experienced, I’ve put on canvas.” De Melo studied the history of Angola and tribal art before starting to create his own art, which is often politically motivated. Corpo e Alma (Body and Soul) from 2005 is a series of eighteen works that uses collage, graffiti, and abstraction to protest war and corruption in Angola. His works, raw and accusatory, address colonization, civil war, racism, slavery, fear, pain, survival, blood, and more. According to de Melo, he has been threatened, poisoned, imprisoned, and beaten for his artwork. However, not all of de Melo’s art is political—it is also spiritual. He often makes religious references, including pasting pages from the Bible in Kikongo (the first African language that the Bible was translated into) in his collages. He also asks existential questions with his art. De Melo has described his work as minimalist. In an interview, he stated: "I like to keep things very simple so people understand me."

De Melo works primarily in series or intense bursts of activity; during these bursts, he will typically produce about two dozen works based on a shared theme. As a young professional artist, de Melo learned to paint in the dark because of the frequent power outages in Angola. He is also interested in the relationship between music and painting, often listening to Jazz artists like Miles Davis as he paints. When he was a teenager in Portugal, de Melo trained as a welder. This is apparent in his iron sculptures that he began working with in 2014.

== Quotes ==
“I think a person is a fruit of his experience. If I were born in New York, I would be a New Yorker.”

“And everything I have experienced, I’ve put on canvas.”

== Exhibitions ==
In 2013, the Museum of Natural History in Luanda exhibited eleven paintings and 10 drawings de Melo entitled "God". From February 16 to March 6, 2016, de Melo exhibited Expand at That Art Fair, sponsored by ArtAfrica magazine in Cape Town, South Africa. Also in 2016, de Melo exhibited sixteen sculptures at the Camões-Portuguese Cultural Center in Luanda from November 24 to December 15. In 2017, he exhibited works made from paper in Papéis at the Dr. António Agostinho Neto Memorial in Luanda. He participated in Jaipur Kala Chaupal artistic residence and festival. From December 2018 to January 2019, de Melo exhibited artwork at the Espaço Mude in Portugal. His Apropriação (Appropriation) exhibited at Lab Art & Co, a modern art gallery in Angola, from January 2018 to March 2019.

The Mormon Arts Center produced an exhibit of de Melo's work entitled Nzambi (God), which was curated by Glen Nelson. After exhibiting at the Mormon Arts festival, Nzambi was exhibited in the Harold B. Lee Library at Brigham Young University. Because of the difficulty in moving artwork from Angola, de Melo painted the works in the exhibit while he was visiting New York during a residency program.

In addition to these exhibitions, de Melo has also exhibited in solo and group exhibitions in Germany, India, Spain, and Holland. He has exhibited twice at the Venice Biennale. See more complete group and solo exhibitions below:

=== Solo exhibitions ===
- 2018 _ Nzambi (God) | Mormon Arts Center Festival New York, USA.
- 2017 _ Papeis | Papers _ at MAAN Luanda, Angola.
- 2017 _ Sculpture “ Africans Day 25 May “ at Airport 4 February Luanda, Angola.
- 2016 _ Sculpture “ History is an object “ at Camões Institute Luanda, Angola.
- 2016 _ M´Bilu | Gallery Sá da Costa Chiado Lisboa, Portugal.
- 2015 _ Launch Deep Book 20 Years of Work at FNAC Stores Lisbon, Portugal.
- 2015 _ Launch Deep Book 20 Years of Work at UEA (Union of writers )Luanda, Angola.
- 2015 _ Retrospective Deep 20 Years of Work at Camões Institute Luanda, Angola.
- 2014 _ Imbondeiro | Baobab UNAP Luanda, Angola.
- 2014 _ Virus | ArtLounge Lisboa, Portugal.
- 2013 _ God | Deus, ( Siexpo ) Museum of Natural History Luanda, Angola.
- 2010 _ Candongueiro | I.Camões C.C. Portugal. Luanda, Angola.
- 2008 _ Specific Killing Structures | UNAP Luanda, Angola.
- 2007 _ Molimo God | (Siexpo) Museum of Natural History | Luanda, Angola.
- 2006 _ Absolut | Triennial Luanda, Angola.
- 2006 _ Spirit | House of Culture Brazil | Angola, Luanda.
- 2005 _ Body and Soul | Triennial Luanda, Angola.
- 2001 _ Support to Children| Cazenga School nº 613 | Luanda, Angola.
- 2000 _ People | Bar “A Nave” Luanda, Angola.
- 1997 _ Movement | Amsterdam Municipal Council, Holland.
- 1995 _ Nautical Club | Vigo, Spain.
- 1994 _ Blood Union | Train station V.N. de Famalicão, Portugal.

=== Group exhibitions ===
- 2017 _ Art Residency KALA CHAUPAL “ Art Collaborative “ Rajasthan, India.
- 2017 _ XIX Bienal de Cerveira “ Brown Deus “V.N.Cerveira, Portugal.
- 2016 _ THAT Art Fair “ Expand Series” LAB Art & Co Cape Town, South Africa.
- 2015 _ Event “ Africa in Lisbon “ Lisbon, Portugal.
- 2014 _ Bienal of Venice, Angola Pavilion, Ensa Collection.
- 2013 _ “Há Jazz no Camões” Camões C.C. Institute, Portugal | Luanda, Angola
- 2013 _ Angola Pavilion, ENSA Ensurance Collection | Bienal of Venice, Italy
- 2009 _ Exhibition Focus – Europa Series: M´Bilu | Struggles – Bamber, Germany.
- 2008 _ Interpretative Realm´s | Agora Gallery New York, USA.
- 2005 _ Exhibition regarding the 30 years of Angolan Art, (Siexpo) Museum of Natural History | Luanda, Angola.
- 2005 _ Open Door, (UNAP) Day of National Hero | Luanda, Angola .
- 2002 _ The Pathways of Associativism, Gallery Chô do Guri | Luanda, Angola.
- 2001 _ Art and Fashion at Elinga Theater | Luanda, Angola.
- 1993 _ End of Course at Lameiras Association, Rodoviária Entre Douro e Minho | V.N.de Famalicão, Portugal.

== Private collections ==
De Melo's works can be found in the following private collections:

- RIVA | Ricardo Viegas de Abreu
- Pena | Paula Pena
- MSDC | Manuel Sousa Duarte Coelho
- Birth | Amilcar Nascimento
- Enterprises Collections and National Institutes
- BNA (Angolan National Bank)
- CMC (Commission of Capital Markets)
- ENSA (National insurance company).
- Sonangol, Ep (Oil Company)
- BP (British Petroleum, Angola)
- BPC (Bank of Savings and Credit)
- BNI (International Investment Bank)
- Nossa Insurances, SA.
- Imogestim, SA.

== Awards ==
De Melo won the Youth Ensarte Prize in 2004 and an honorable mention in 2014. He also was awarded the "Sona Desenhos na Sand" award from the Norwegian company Norsk Hidro.
