= Christoph Büchel =

Swiss artist

Christoph Büchel (born 1966) is a Swiss artist known for provocative contemporary installations. He received international attention for constructing a mosque in a Venice church and suggesting that prototypes for Donald Trump's wall should be considered land art.

== Early life and education ==
Christoph Büchel was born in Basel, Switzerland, in 1966.

== Dispute with Mass MoCA ==
Since early 2007, Büchel has been ensconced in a legal dispute with the Massachusetts Museum of Contemporary Art (commonly known as "Mass MoCA"). The museum had agreed to take on Büchel's massive project, "Training Ground for Democracy," only to balk at certain costs associated with some of the planned installations. The museum, which had already invested significantly in the exhibit, won permission in court to open it to the public without the consent of Büchel, who claims to do so would misrepresent his work. Mass MoCA's Director, Joe Thompson, decided to dismantle it instead without opening it to the public.

== Selected works ==
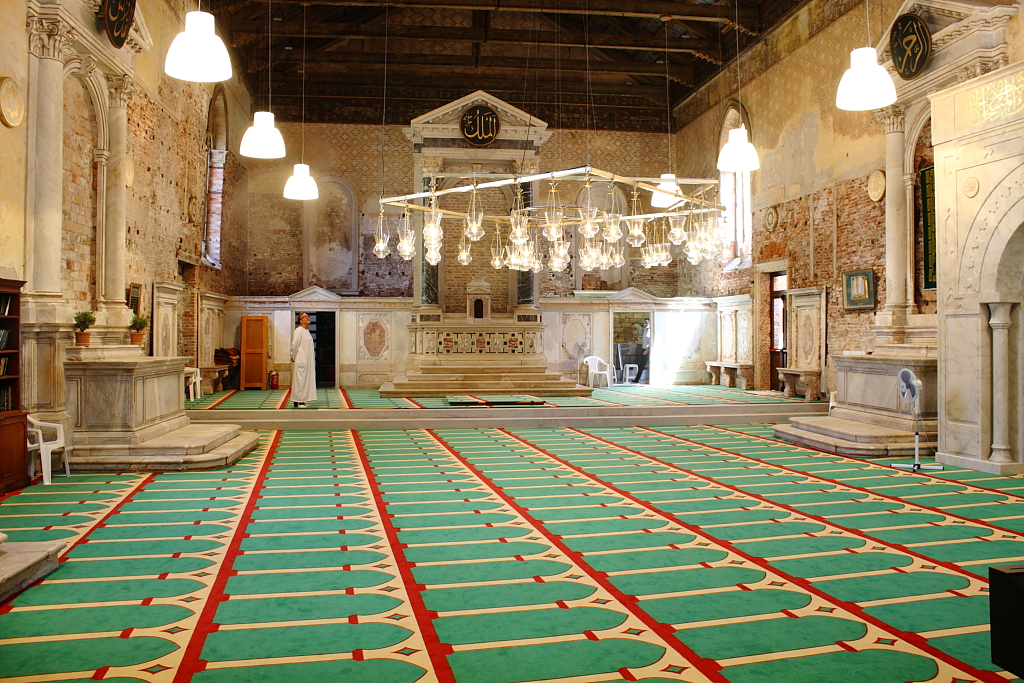
The Abbazia della Misericordia transformed into mosquee

For the 2015 Venice Biennale, Christoph Büchel contributed Iceland's national pavilion which consisted of a conceptual work of art which transformed the 10th-century old Church of the Abbey of Misericordia into a generic mosque. Labeled The Mosque: The First Mosque in the Historic City of Venice, it was partly inspired by disputes in Iceland over building the first purpose-built Reykjavík Mosque. After a complaint presented by a member of the neo-fascist party New Force, the Venetian authorities closed the installation, citing permit violations.

In 2018 Büchel encouraged artistic recognition of eight prototypes of the border wall erected near the US-Mexico border. Büchel mobilized support through an online petition.

For the 2019 Venice Biennale, Büchel displayed Barca Nostra, a shipwreck that had sunk with hundreds of migrants aboard.

His 2024 Venice Biennale installation, titled Monte di Pietà, presented at the Fondazione Prada, received numerous positive reviews, although in some cases it was criticized by representatives of opposing perspectives, such as the Palestinian artist Dima Srouji, as well as by representatives of Jewish organizations.
