= Nástio Mosquito =

Angolan visual artist

- Born: 1981 (age 43–44); Luanda, Angola
- Other names: Nastio Mosquito, Nastiá, Saco, Cucumber Slice, Zura Zuara

Nástio Mosquito (born 1981) is an Angolan-born multidisciplinary artist. He works in music, sound, video art, performance art, installation art, and spoken word poetry. Mosquito's art deals with topics such as identity and faith, as well as racism and the complicated colonial history of his native Angola. He has used various monikers including Nastiá, Saco, Cucumber Slice, and Zura Zuara.

== Life and career ==
Mosquito was born in Luanda, the capital of Angola in 1981 and most of his education took place in Lisbon, Portugal.

He participated in the 29th São Paulo Art Biennial in 2010. In 2014, he was awarded the Future Generation Art Prize. He works in Ghent, Belgium.
