= 56th Venice Biennale =

- Genre: Art exhibition
- Begins: May 9, 2015
- Ends: November 22, 2015
- Location: Venice
- Country: Italy
- Previous event: 55th Venice Biennale (2013)
- Next event: 57th Venice Biennale (2017)

The 56th Venice Biennale was an international contemporary art exhibition held between May and November 2015. The Venice Biennale takes place biennially in Venice, Italy. Artistic director Okwui Enwezor curated its central exhibition, "All The World's Futures".

== Overview ==
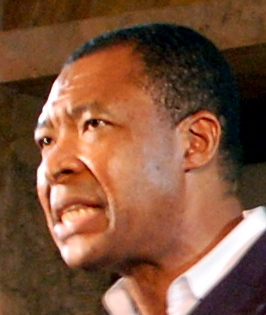
Okwui Enwezor, the Biennale's curator and its first from Africa

The Biennale is the world's most prestigious art exhibition, an international show of contemporary art. It is a major event for art world cosmopolitans. The 56th Biennale began one month sooner than usual, and ran between May 9 and November 22, 2015. The opening coincided with the Frieze Art Fair in New York, which affected early attendance. At the 56th Biennale, 136 artists represented 88 nations. Nearly a third of the artists had exhibited in a previous Biennale. The 56th Biennale was the first for the newly constructed Australian pavilion, the 30th national pavilion in the Giardini, and the first in the new millennium. Kenya and Costa Rica both withdrew from this year's Biennale.

Okwui Enwezor served as the 56th Biennale's curator, its first from Africa. His theme was "All The World's Futures". Enwezor created the Arena, an interdisciplinary space for live performance in Giardini's Central Pavilion. The Arena's main performance was a live reading of Das Kapital (Karl Marx). It also hosted a performance by Olaf Nicolai and a memorial for Julius Eastman. Enwezor also curated the Arsenale, a group exhibition for 200 artists without permanent national pavilions. Additionally, 44 events sanctioned by Enwezor ran in conjunction with the Biennale. The most common media throughout the Biennale were film, photography, and documents.

== Reception ==
Artnet News recommended the American, German, Danish, Belgian, Icelandic, and Cyprian pavilions. Of the external events, the magazine recommended the collaboration between Shilpa Gupta and Rashid Rana (of India and Pakistan, respectively), the installation by Simon Denny (New Zealand), and the exhibitions of Peter Doig and Cy Twombly.

The Guardian's Laura Cumming wrote that the Biennale felt "more like a glum trudge than the usual exhilarating adventure". Most of the Biennale's art, she described, was "flat" in the Giardini and thematically "straight into the heart of darkness", highlighting international issues such as work conditions, pollution and ecology, arms trade, prisons, and asylums. Sarah Lucas in the British pavilion, for instance, stood out for her lack of political themes but also signaled "the end of the YBA revivals at Venice". Cumming highlighted a disassembled Nigerian magazine in the German pavilion as particularly lazy.

Cumming wrote that the Biennale was steeped in its contradictory dependence on and criticism of capitalism, which she felt was embodied by British artist Isaac Julien's participation in both the Rolls-Royce pavilion and the Arena Das Kapital live reading.

She recommended the Russian, Japanese, Albanian, American, and Australian pavilions. Fiona Hall in the Australian pavilion made a "museum of wondrous objects" that used present materials to make ancient objects, like "warrior masks knitted out of military fatigues". She praised Hall for her response to current politics instead of "simply rehearsing the usual art-scene rhetoric". The Japanese pavilion, an installation of red nets carrying thousands of keys, was Cumming's "clear winner, by general consent". In comparison, Cumming described the Das Kapital performance's audience as nearly empty and likened the other pavilions to Commonwealth Institute lectures.

Hyperallergic later named Enwezor's central exhibition among the decade's best, and following his death in 2019, curators said his exhibition embodied his career of internationalizing contemporary art beyond Europe and North America.

== Awards ==
- Golden Lion for best national participation: Armenia
- Golden Lion for best artist in the central exhibition: Adrian Piper
- Silver Lion for a promising young artist: Im Heung-soon
- Golden Lion for lifetime achievement: El Anatsui
- Special Golden Lion for services to the arts: Susanne Ghez

== See also ==
- The Mosque
