= António Ole =

Angolan artist

- Born: Antonio Oliveira; 1951; Luanda, Angola
- Education: African-American Culture and Cinema, University of California in Los Angeles; Film at the Center for Advanced Film and Television Studies, American Film Institute in Los Angeles
- Occupations: Artist, Painter, Photographer, Filmmaker
- Partner: Ana Braz

António Ole (born 1951) is an Angolan multidisciplinary visual artist, and among the best known in the country. Ole's works, which often center around representing contemporary issues in Angolan society, have received international acclaim for their incorporation of found materials, painting technique, and unique interpretations of recent Post-Colonial history. Ole's first international exhibition was in 1984 at the Los Angeles Museum of African American Art. He has also shown work at the Havana Biennial and Johannesburg Biennial. Ole participated in the African delegation to the 1992 International Exhibition of Seville.

In addition to painting and other visual mediums, Ole also works in photography and videography. His photographs were displayed at the 2015 Venice Biennale and the subsequent 2017 Biennale showed several of his films such as: Carnaval da Vitória (a short film on Angola's post-independence carnival), Ritmo do N'Gola Ritmos (a documentary of a prominent Angolan band), No Caminho das Estrelas (a documentary on Angolan president António Agostinho Neto), Conceição Tchiambula Um dia, Uma vida (a documentary about peasantry in Angola), and Sem Título (a poetic, ecological essay).

== Early life ==
António Ole was born António Oliveira in 1951 in the Angolan Capital of Luanda, but spent his primary school years living in Maiorca, near Coimbra, the native village of his paternal grandparents. Ole's early experiences in these two towns informed his first artistic aspirations, and at a young age he began to practice drawing and draftsmanship. Upon returning to Luanda, he continued his studies at the Liceu Salvador Correia, where his burgeoning artistic career included his first photography series of black and white portraits of locals. In high school, various teachers noticed his strong connection to art and began praise his work. In late high school and in his following studies, he shared his first exhibitions that spurned the start to his career. At the start of Angola's independence, he began working for a television station in Luanda which cultivated his love and knowledge for film media. Wanting to learn more about the world of cinema, Ole traveled to the United States for education in 1977, in his words:

"I was admitted to one of the best film schools in the USA, The American Film Institute's Centre for Advanced Film Studies. Studying there was fantastic because I was able to work with professional actors, producers and directors and it was a unique experience for me".

In a 2016 Interview, Ole affirmed that his time in Los Angeles led him to find his "Africanness." In the same interview, Ole noted the profound influence of the modernists, cubists, and Picasso in his early career.

== Career ==
Ole's higher education predisposed him for a strong artistic career, as he studied African-American Culture and Cinema at the University of California in Los Angeles and later also studied film at the American Film Institute. Ole is known for his versatility as an artist, creating in many mediums such as photography, cinema, painting, sculpture, and installation. This multifaceted approach emerged both as a result of popular late-twentieth century retrospectives of mixed media practices from the first half of the century, as well as the turbulence and chaos perpetrated by the Angolan Civil War lasting intermittently from 1975 until 2002.

=== Early period: 1969–1979 ===
The early works of Ole's career were often flat, surrealist-inspired gauche and pencil collages depicting interiors and bizarre landscapes. This early period is marked by a usage of vibrant colors and abstracted patterns that invoke comic strips and television screens, such as in the "Domestic Landscapes" series from 1974 that positioned everyday objects against abstract and colorful backgrounds.

Following the outbreak of the Civil War in 1975, Ole's work began to take a more grounded and realist tone in response to nationwide tragedies, as he moved back into the photography and filmmaking of his youth. Until the end of the decade, Ole worked almost exclusively in black and white, both in his continued painting and drawing works as well as his photography, which set out to capture the faces and identities of Angolans living out their lives in the midst of the war. Nevertheless, Ole was a supporter of the independence cause, documenting and romanticizing the social efforts against colonial influence in his acclaimed films Railway Workers and Rhythm of N'Gola Rhythms from 1975 and 1978 respectively.

=== Photography (1973-1979) ===
"Untitled" Black and Photographs from Ole, are a series of portraits that he created in the beginning of his extensive career. He originally started his career creating docuseries for television during Angola's post-colonial transition. These pictures are a collection of the portraits he took during this time and his intent was to document the changes happening in Angola. The portraits include several people from the community: an older man sporting a suit coat and hat; the older man's wife who is seen wearing a bandana; and various other members such as a younger man who looks as if he yelling at someone, and another young man who smiles at Ole.

=== Mid-career (1980–2000) ===
The last two decades of the twentieth century were the most prolific and diverse period of Ole's creative output, as he engaged in a variety of styles and mediums, ranging from massive found-object sculptures to oil paintings and paper collages. Ole's works in the 1980s largely consisted of many acrylic and oil paintings that used psychedelic imagery and colors to depict contemporary landscapes, much like his earlier, pre-war work. Notably, Ole distinguished these new works from his art of the early 1970s through greater experimentations in subject arrangement and patterns that moved the compositions further away from realism. Ole's choice of subjects also delved deeper into a cultural history of Luanda, as several works attempt to capture the mythologies and animal imagery that is imbued in Angolan culture.

The late 80's and early 90's saw a shift, in Ole's practice, towards more sculptural works and found object installations, creating a style that would typify his career as evidenced in later retrospective exhibitions. These sculptures often consisted of figural ironworks, generally two-dimensional folk creatures or smaller masks adorned with found metals, appliances, rocks, and construction hardware. One of these sculptures, Margem da Zone Limite, (Boundary Line), an angel-like figure formed out of rusted street signs and old lamp stands, was featured in the 1995 Johannesburg Biennale. In addition to sculptural works, Ole also continued his mythological works through oil and pastel pieces that evoke the Southwestern African landscapes he grew up in, as well as the perpetual chaos of late twentieth-century Angolan history and society. Many of these works, such as 1992's Terre queimada, or Scorched Earth, use a primarily orange and red color palette that invokes the red clay and dust that is so characteristic of the Southwestern African coast.

In the mid-1990's, Ole returned to paper and canvas, making numerous collage works out of recycled papers, hand tools, and found natural materials. These works connect human activities and manmade objects with elements of nature into particular, mediative arrangements. Ole's collages are indicative of both Angolan material culture as well as a greater discourse on human engagement with the environment and the movement of different energies. These collages are untitled, instead dictated by Roman numerals.

=== "On the Margins of Borderlands" (1994-95) ===
This installation is the first of Ole's installations and was presented in 3 continents. His intention with this piece was to highlight the violent history of colonialism in Africa and the deterioration of the architecture around him. The work features a broken boat that includes birds, a nest, and the ocean; police reports; and bricks. Broken in half, the fractured boat represents the fact that it is going nowhere; its condition which parallels the post-colonial condition of Africa. The birds, nest, and ocean represent the beauty of his homeland. The police reports that are found inside of the boat are actual reports that he collected outside of an administration building and represent the crime that has fallen upon his homeland. The bricks lay to represent the buildings that were falling apart and being reduced to singular pieces rather than the composite structures they once were.

=== "Township" Works (2000–Present) ===
In 1994, Ole began the still-ongoing series loosely identified under the "Township" title that has become the most popular and acclaimed body of work in his career, as well as his primary focus. The project began as a photography series of the ramshackle and makeshift walls that make up houses in Luanda, which are often constructed from random combinations of metals and available materials. After years of experimenting with his technique of found object arrangements around the turn of the century, Ole expanded this style into large-scale installations, which often consist of shipping containers and construction materials. These works signify and edify the presence of laborers and near-peasantry in Angolan society, as well as pointedly reminding viewers of a recent colonial history that has induced slavery in the past and impoverishment in the present. At the same time, many of the "walls" are brightly colored or painted, which imbues a sense of commercial manufacture and inhumanity in the installations. The premier work of this series is the Township Wall installation in 2004, now residing in the collection of the Museum KunstPalast in Dusseldorf. The Wall has appeared in many iterations throughout the world, with each difference being designated by a different Roman numeral. In his own words, Ole views the works as representative of a "social conscience" through a transformation of the landscape they appear in.

The Township series also reflects Ole's globalist views on interconnecting different art movements, as he stated in an interview following his biennial prize that he "reject[s] the notion of "Contemporary African Artists'...that we [African Artists] should be considered 'Contemporary Artists,' period." In the exhibition titled "Who Knows Tomorrow?," which included several Township Wall iterations in the checklist, the National Gallery Berlin noted:

"Ole suggests a link between failed modernist social engineering and urban dystopia in postcolonial Africa and across the globe. Walls in his work become visual texts and archives of the bare lives of inhabitants of shacks and makeshift buildings located at the margins of Angolan cities and towns. The more recent wall constructions suggest resilience and creativity in their assertive colorfulness (reminiscent of Pop Art), as well as the defiant impulse to humanize even the harshest urban slums."

Ole's work in recent years has found a renewed interest in the draftsmanship of his youth as well as experimental photography. His Wet Triptych photograph from 2013 continues a series begun in the early 2000s, in which Ole juxtaposes close-up shots of natural materials with different textures. The spirituality and solemnity of these materials and their value is formed out of his careful framing and titling. Ole has also returned to small-scale sculpture, such as with his 2017 Close Body figurine that uses BDSM imagery, inorganic materials, and exclusionary symbolism in the creation of a traditional North Angolan statuary, which overtly provokes the histories of colonial involvement and invasion into native traditions and art forms. Dr. Ana Balona de Oliveira of the Institute of Art History at the New University of Lisbon comments that this past decade of Ole's art is more expressive and direct in its social commentary than in the past, as he "embrace[s] the freedom to ask by making."

=== "Allegory of Construction" I (2009) ===
This mixed media site-specific installation, exhibited at the National Museum of African Art, Smithsonian is the initial of his site-specific series originally installed in the 1990s in Chicago, Illinois, Dusseldorf, Germany, and Washington DC. With his Dusseldorf installation, Ole incorporated German street signs and corrugate metal sheets with the addition of bright colors. His Chicago installation used "an assemblage of gilded moldings, windows, a picket fence" among other materials.

=== "Allegory of Construction" II (2009) ===
This mixed media site-specific installation, exhibited at the National Museum of African Art, Smithsonian is the second of his site-specific series. In his second iteration of the "Allegory of Construction Series," he used materials with the intent to represent the musseques--shanty towns--in his hometown of Luanda. For this installation, he used "cast-off doors, corrugated sheet metal, and other discarded papers and objects." He spent years photographing the deteriorating buildings and structures around him before assembling this installation.

=== "50 Years – Past, Present and Future" (2019) ===
This exhibit marks 50 years of his career and included 40 works from his career across film, photography, painting, and sculpture. This exhibit was on display at Banco Económico, Luanda, Angola.

== Awards ==
Ole has received many accolades for his work:

- Acquisition Prize, IV Salon of Modern Art, Luanda (1970)
- Glauber Rocha Prize, Figueira da Foz International Film Festival (1981)
- Painting Award, II Havana Biennial (1986)
- ENSA-Arte Prize, ENSA – Seguros de Angola SA, Luanda (1992)
- Merit Fund, Government of Angola (2002)
- National Prize for Culture and Arts, Angola (2004)
- Commendation of Merit, Portugal (2007)

== Selected exhibitions ==
Ole has exhibited widely and frequently. Below is a selected list of important exhibitions:

- António Ole – Museum of Angola. Luanda (1968)
- António Ole – Museum of African American Art, Los Angeles (1984)
- António Ole – National Bank of Angola, Luanda (1985)
- Angola-Brazil – 500 Years – Casa de Angola, Salvador (2000)
- Hidden Pages, Stolen Bodies – Veemvloer – 19th World Wide Video Festival, Amsterdam (2001)
- The Short Century - Gropiusbau, Germany (2001)
- Pan-African Exhibition of Contemporary Art – Museum of Modern Art of Bahia (Solar do Unhão), Salvador (2005)
- ANTONIO OLE. Luanda, Los Angeles, Lisbon – Calouste Gulbenkian Museum, Lisbon (2016)
- Magnetic Memory / Resonance, Angola Pavilion, Venice Biennale (2017)
- 50 Years – Past, Present and Future (2019)

== Selected filmography ==
- Railway Workers (1975)
- Resistência popular em Benguel (1975)
- Rhythm of N'Gola Rhythms (1978)
- No Caminho Das Estrelas (1980)
- Long Is the Evening, Quiet Is the Day (1983)
- Sonangol, 10 Anos Mais Forte (1987)
- Luanda (1995)
