= Paula Nascimento =

Angolan architect and curator

Paula Nascimento is an Angolan architect and curator who along with Stefano Rabolli Pansera curated the Angolan pavilion at the 55th International Art Exhibition - La Biennale di Venezia which won the Golden Lion for "best national participation".

== Career ==
In 2011, Nascimento and Pansera founded Beyond Entropy Africa, a limited company registered in Angola. Beyond Entropy Africa focuses on Luanda as the paradigm of the urban condition of the African Sub-Saharan region, a type of city that is defined by a lack of basic infrastructures and a high density of population. In 2012, Beyond Entropy Africa curated the Angola Pavilion at the 13th Architecture Biennale in Venice with the title of their partnership ‘Beyond Entropy’. In 2013, Beyond Entropy Africa curated the Angola Pavilion at the 55th Art Biennale in Venice entitled ‘Luanda, Encyclopedic City’ featuring the work of photographer Edson Chagas.

She has been announced in July 2025 to be one of the two curators of the Sharjah Biennal in United Arab Emirates alongside Angela Harutyunyan.

== Other activities ==
In 2023, Nascimento was a member of the visual arts jury for the annual DAAD Artists-in-Berlin Program.
