= In Minor Keys =

Theme for the 61st Venice Biennale

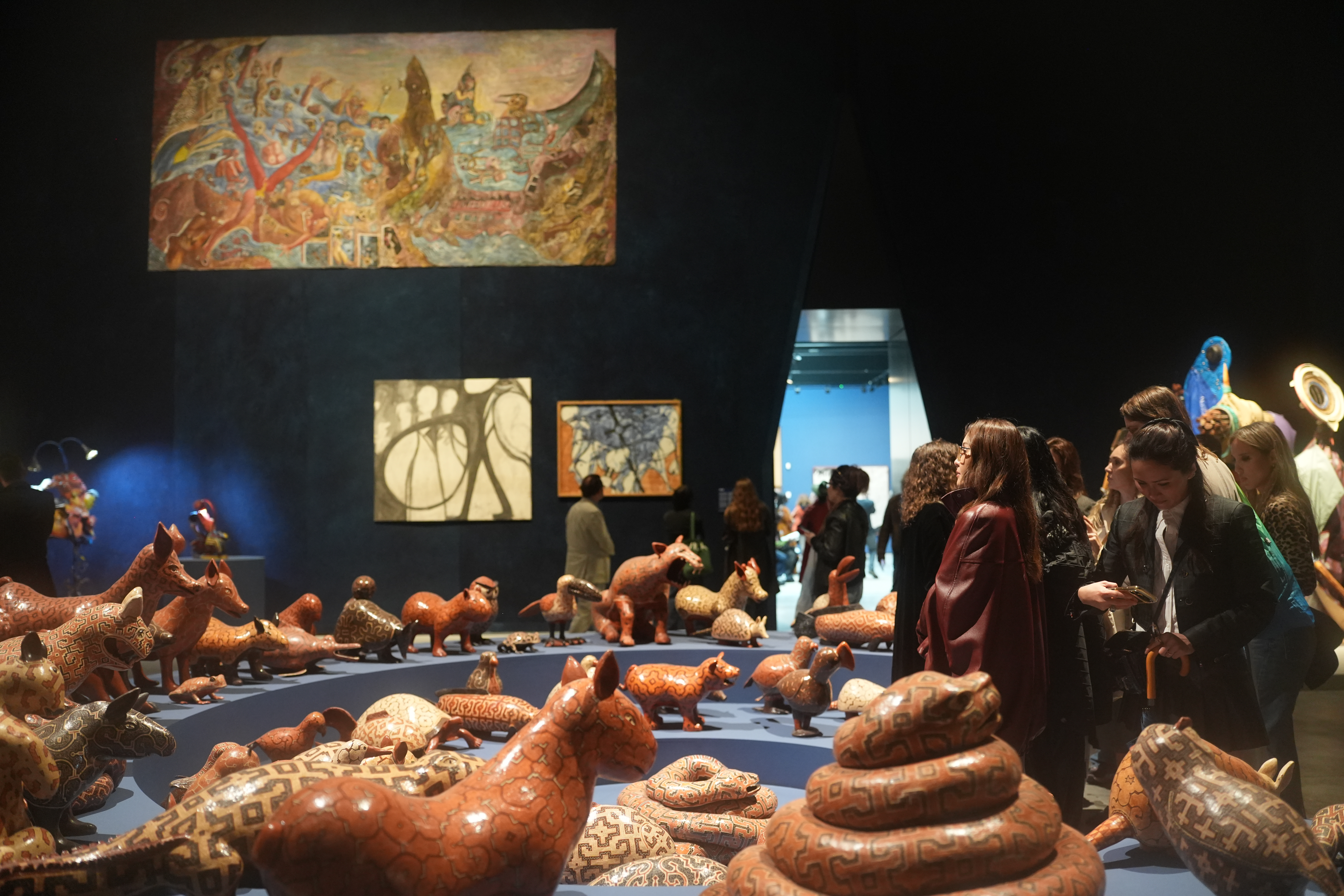
- Date: May 9–November 22, 2026
- Venue: Giardini della Biennale and Venetian Arsenal
- Location: Venice

In Minor Keys is the theme for the 61st Venice Biennale. It was selected by Koyo Kouoh, the curator who died at age 57 of liver cancer a year before the Biennale opened.

== Concept ==
Kouoh chose her theme to emphasize the subtle registers in which minor keys operate. An excerpt of her curatorial concept read,

These are the cues for an exhibition; an exhibition tuned in to the minor keys; an exhibition that invites listening to the persistent signals of earth and life, connecting to soul frequencies. If, in music, the minor keys are often associated with strangeness, melancholy and sorrow, here their joy, solace, hope, and transcendence manifest as well. In the minor keys, sound and sensation are grounding, they hold the cadences, melodies, and silences of resonant worlds that gather and create together a polyphonous assembly of art, convening and communing in convivial collectivity, beaming across the void of alienation and the crackle of conflict.

== Participants ==
The central exhibit invited 111 participants, spanning individual practitioners, collaborative duos, collectives and artist-led organizations. The final exhibit had 110 participants.

Many of the participating artists have migrant or diasporic backgrounds. About a quarter live in Africa, while more than half the participants are based in Europe and the United States.

Below is the final list of artists in the main exhibit according to the Venice Biennale.

Name	Years	Birthplace	City of Residence
Pio Abad	b. 1983	Manila, Philippines	London
Philip Aguirre y Otegui	b. 1961	Schoten, Belgium	Antwerp, Belgium
Akinbode Akinbiyi	b. 1946	Oxford, England	Berlin
Laurie Anderson	b. 1947	Chicago, United States	New York City
Fabrice Aragno	b. 1970	Neuchâtel, Switzerland	Lausanne, Switzerland
arms ache avid aeon Nancy Brooks Brody, Joy Episalla, Zoe Leonard, Carrie Yamaoka, fierce pussy, Jo-ey Tang	1957–2023; b. 1957; b. 1961; b. 1957; founded 1991; b. 1978	New York City; Bronxville, United States; Liberty, United States; Glen Cove, United States; New York City; Hong Kong	New York City
Kader Attia	b. 1970	Dugny, France	Berlin and Paris
Sammy Baloji	b. 1978	Lubumbashi, Democratic Republic of the Congo	Brussels and Lubumbashi
Ranti Bam	b. 1982	Lagos, Nigeria	Paris and Lagos
Alvaro Barrington	b. 1983	Caracas, Venezuela	London
Éric Baudelaire	b. 1973	Salt Lake City, United States	Paris
Sabian Baumann	b. 1962	Zug, Switzerland	Zurich
blaxTARLINES KUMASI	founded 2015	Kumasi, Ghana	based in Kumasi, Ghana
Beverly Buchanan	1940–2015	Fuquay, United States	
Seyni Awa Camara	1945–2026	Oussouy, Senegal	
Maria Magdalena Campos-Pons & Kamaal Malak	b. 1959; b. 1962	Matanzas, Cuba; Philadelphia, United States	live in Nashville, United States
Nick Cave	b. 1959	Chicago, United States	Chicago
Carolina Caycedo	b. 1978	London, England	Los Angeles and Caguas, Puerto Rico
Annalee Davis	b. 1963	St. Michael, Barbados	St. George, Barbados
Dawn DeDeaux	b. 1952	New Orleans, United States	New Orleans
BuBu de la Madeleine	b. 1961	Osaka, Japan	Nara, Japan
Nolan Oswald Dennis	b. 1988	Lusaka, Zambia	Johannesburg
Denniston Hill	founded 2008	Glen Wild, United States	based in Glen Wild, United States
Bonnie Devine	b. 1952	Toronto, Canada	Toronto
Godfried Donkor	b. 1964	Accra, Ghana	London and Accra
Marcel Duchamp	1887–1968	Blainville-Crevon, France	
Edouard Duval-Carrié	b. 1954	Port-au-Prince, Haiti	Miami
Torkwase Dyson	b. 1973	Chicago, United States	Beacon, United States
rana elnemr	b. 1974	Hannover, Germany	Cairo
Theo Eshetu	b. 1958	London, England	Berlin and Rome
Rachel Fallon with Alice Maher	b. 1971; b. 1956	Dublin, Ireland; Tipperary, Ireland	Dublin; County Mayo, Ireland
Sofía Gallisá Muriente	b. 1986	San Juan, Puerto Rico	Puerto Rico
G.A.S. Foundation	founded 2019	Lagos and Ikiṣẹ, Nigeria	based in Lagos and Ikiṣẹ, Nigeria
Adebunmi Gbadebo	b. 1992	Livingston, United States	Philadelphia and Newark, United States
Leonilda González	1923–2017	Minuano, Uruguay	
Linda Goode Bryant	b. 1949	Columbus, United States	New York City
Joana Hadjithomas & Khalil Joreige	b. 1969; b. 1969	Beirut, Lebanon; Moussaitbeh, Lebanon	live in Beirut and Paris
Alexa Kumiko Hatanaka	b. 1988	Toronto, Canada	Toronto, New York City, and Japan
Ayrson Heráclito	b. 1968	Macaúbas, Brazil	Salvador, Brazil
Clarissa Herbst & Dominique Rust	b. 1959; b. 1960	Crailsheim, Germany; Basel, Switzerland	live in Zurich
Nicholas Hlobo	b. 1975	Cape Town, South Africa	Johannesburg
Carsten Höller	b. 1961	Brussels, Belgium	Stockholm, Biriwa, and Tuscany
Sohrab Hura	b. 1981	Chinsurah, India	New Delhi
Alfredo Jaar	b. 1965	Santiago, Chile	Lisbon
Mohammed Joha	b. 1978	Gaza, Palestine	Marseille
Michael Joo	b. 1966	Ithaca, United States	New York City
Nina Katchadourian	b. 1968	Stanford, United States	New York City and Berlin
Sandra Knecht	b. 1968	Buus, Switzerland	Buus, Switzerland
Marcia Kure	b. 1970	Kano State, Nigeria	Princeton, Abuja, and Kaduna
Natalia Lassalle-Morillo with Gloria Morillo	b. 1991	San Juan, Puerto Rico	San Juan
Florence Lazar	b. 1966	Paris, France	Paris
Dan Lie	b. 1988		Berlin
Werewere Liking	b. 1950	Mgombas, Cameroon	Abidjan
Daniel Lind-Ramos	b. 1953	Loiza, Puerto Rico	Loiza
lugar a dudas	founded 2004	Cali, Colombia	based in Cali, Colombia
Senzeni Marasela	b. 1977	Thokoza, South Africa	Johannesburg
Guadalupe Maravilla	b. 1976	San Salvador, El Salvador	New York City
Manuel Mathieu	b. 1986	Port-au-Prince, Haiti	Montreal and Paris
Georgina Maxim	b. 1980	Harare, Zimbabwe	Harare and Mutare
Tiona Nekkia McClodden	b. 1981	Blytheville, United States	Philadelphia
Big Chief Demond Melancon	b. 1978	New Orleans, United States	New Orleans
Avi Mograbi	b. 1956	Tel Aviv	Lisbon
Wangechi Mutu	b. 1972	Nairobi, Kenya	New York City and Nairobi
Nairobi Contemporary Art Institute	founded 2020	Nairobi, Kenya	based in Nairobi
Eustaquio Neves	b. 1955	Juatuba, Brazil	Diamantina, Brazil
Tammy Nguyen	b. 1984	San Francisco, United States	Easton, United States
Tuấn Andrew Nguyễn	b. 1976	Sài Gòn, Vietnam	Hội An and works in Hồ Chí Minh City
Otobong Nkanga	b. 1974	Kano, Nigeria	Antwerp and Uyo
Kaloki Nyamai	b. 1985	Nairobi, Kenya	Nairobi
Temitayo Ogunbiyi	b. 1984	Rochester, United States	Lagos
Pauline Oliveros	1932–2016	Houston, United States	
Kambui Olujimi	b. 1976	Brooklyn, United States	New York City
Hagar Ophir	b. 1983	Jerusalem	Berlin
Uriel Orlow	b. 1973	Zurich, Switzerland	Lisbon and London
Ebony G. Patterson	b. 1981	Kingston, Jamaica	Kingston and Chicago
Rajni Perera & Marigold Santos	b. 1985; b. 1981	Colombo, Sri Lanka; Manila, Philippines	Toronto; Calgary
Thania Petersen	b. 1980	Cape Town, South Africa	Cape Town
Alan Phelan	b. 1968	Dublin, Ireland	Dublin
Johannes Phokela	b. 1966	Johannesburg, South Africa	Johannesburg
Léonard Pongo	b. 1988	Liège, Belgium	Brussels and Kinshasa
Walid Raad	b. 1967	Chbanieh, Lebanon	Medusa, United States
Mohammed Z. Rahman	b. 1997	London, England	London
RAW Material Company	founded 2008	Dakar, Senegal	based in Dakar
Tabita Rezaire	b. 1989	Paris, France	Cayenne, French Guiana
Guadalupe Rosales	b. 1980	Redwood City, United States	Los Angeles
Yo-E Ryou	b. 1987	Seoul, South Korea	Seoul and Jeju Island
Khaled Sabsabi	b. 1965	Tripoli, Lebanon	Sydney
Rose Salane	b. 1992	New York City, United States	New York City
Issa Samb	1945–2017	Dakar, Senegal	
Amina Saoudi Aït Khay	b. 1955	Casablanca, Morocco	Sousse, Tunisia
Carrie Schneider	b. 1979	Chicago, United States	New York City
Hala Schoukair	b. 1957	Beirut, Lebanon	Beirut
Berni Searle	b. 1964	Cape Town, South Africa	Cape Town
Mmakgabo Mmapula Helen Sebidi	b. 1943	Marapyane, South Africa	Johannesburg
Wardha Shabbir	b. 1987	Lahore, Pakistan	Lahore
Yoshiko Shimada	b. 1959	Tokyo, Japan	Chiba, Japan
Himali Singh Soin & David Soin Tappeser	b. 1987; b. 1985	New Delhi, India; Bonn, Germany	live in London and New Delhi
Buhlebezwe Siwani	b. 1987	Johannesburg, South Africa	Amsterdam and Cape Town
Cauleen Smith	b. 1967	Riverside, United States	Los Angeles
Vera Tamari	b. 1944	Jerusalem, Palestine	Ramallah, Palestine
Tsai Ming-liang	b. 1957	Kuching, Malaysia	New Taipei City and Taipei
Victoria-Idongesit Udondian	b. 1982	Uyo, Nigeria	Lagos and New York City
Celia Vásquez Yui	b. 1960	Pucallpa, Peru	the Peruvian Amazon and Pucallpa
Kemang Wa Lehulere	b. 1984	Cape Town, South Africa	Cape Town
Kennedy Yanko	b. 1988	St. Louis, United States	Miami
Raed Yassin	b. 1979	Beirut, Lebanon	Beirut and Berlin
Sawangwongse Yawnghwe	b. 1971	Shan State, Burma	Zutphen and Chiang Mai
Billie Zangewa	b. 1973	Blantyre, Malawi	Johannesburg

== Collaborators ==
Before her death, Kouoh developed a theoretical framework for the exhibition, and had selected artists, as well as curatorial collaborators. These included Gabe Beckhurst Feijoo of Britain, Marie Hélène Pereira of Senegal and Rasha Salti, who is based in Berlin and Beirut. In addition, she asked her assistant, Rory Tsapayi of Cape Town, to join as a researcher, as well as the journalist Siddhartha Mitter of New York to be editor in chief.

== Reception ==
Domus, the influential Italian art magazine, described the show as "more sensorial than didactic, more relational than interpretative, one that relies on empathy, presence, and attentive listening."
