= Cecilia Alemani =

Italian curator (born 1977)

- Occupation: Curator

Cecilia Alemani (born 1977) is an Italian curator based in New York City. She is the Donald R. Mullen Jr. Director & Chief Curator of High Line Art and the artistic director of the 59th Venice Biennale in 2022. She previously curated the 2017 Biennale's Italian pavilion and served as artistic director of the inaugural edition of the 2018 Art Basel Cities in Buenos Aires, held in 2018.

== Early life and education ==
Born in Italy, Alemani received her BA in philosophy from the University of Milan and her MA in Curatorial Studies from Bard College.

== Career ==
From 2012 to 2017, Alemani curated Frieze Projects, the nonprofit platform of the Frieze Art Fair, which has presented new productions by emerging artists and reconstructions of historical exhibitions. From 2009 to 2010, she was Curatorial Director of the year-long X Initiative, New York, an experimental nonprofit for which she oversaw numerous exhibitions and events. Alemani is a co-founder of No Soul For Sale, a festival of independent spaces, nonprofit organizations, and artists’ collectives. As an independent curator, she organized many exhibitions in museums, nonprofit spaces, and galleries, including Gió Marconi Gallery, Milan; Blum & Poe, Los Angeles; MoMA PS1, New York; and the Whitney Museum, New York.

In 2017, Alemani curated the Italian Pavilion at the Venice Biennale, 57th International Art Exhibition. Titled Il Mondo Magico (The Magical World), the exhibition featured new large-scale, site-specific commissions by Giorgio Andreotta Calò, Roberto Cuoghi, and Adelita Husni-Bey.

In 2018, Alemani was artistic director of the first edition of Art Basel Cities, a new initiative in partnership with Buenos Aires to celebrate the city's thriving cultural ecosystem. Alemani curated a city-wide exhibition titled Hopscotch (Rayuela) that featured 18 works in close dialogue with their venues, shaping a multilayered experience that connected visual art, urban spaces, and the city's histories in unexpected ways. Among the participating artists were Eduardo Basualdo, Pia Camil, Maurizio Cattelan, Gabriel Chaile, and Luciana Lamothe.

For Art Basel in 2019, Alemani commissioned Alexandra Pirici to stage a new iteration of Aggregate for the city's Messeplatz. The immersive work is a performative environment featuring more than 60 performers who move around the visitors, enacting gestures and sounds that reference disparate forms of cultural heritage, creating something like a time capsule.

=== High Line, 2011–present ===
Since 2011, Alemani has overseen the High Line Art Program, developing an expertise in commissioning and producing ambitious artworks for public and unusual spaces. During her tenure at the High Line, she has commissioned major projects by El Anatsui, Carol Bove, Rashid Johnson, Barbara Kruger, Faith Ringgold, Ed Ruscha, and Adrián Villar Rojas, among other artists. She has also organized group exhibitions featuring works by young and emerging artists, including Firelei Báez, Jon Rafman, Max Hooper Schneider, and Andra Ursuta. Recently, Alemani spearheaded the High Line Plinth, a new program featuring monumental artworks that commenced in June 2019 with Brick House, a sculpture by artist Simone Leigh. Through these public initiatives, Alemani has sought meaningful civic engagement by galvanizing dialogue, awareness, and a sense of possibility.

=== Venice Biennale, 2022 ===
In response to her appointment as the Curator and artistic director of the 59th Venice Biennale in 2022, Alemani commented that “as the first Italian woman to hold this position, I understand and appreciate the responsibility and also the opportunity offered to me,” adding, “I intend to give voice to artists to create unique projects that reflect their visions and our society."

== Other activities ==
Alemani was part of the juries that awarded the 2024 Preis der Nationalgalerie to Pan Daijing, Daniel Lie, Hanne Lippard and James Richards; the 2023 Future Generation Art Prize to Ashfika Rahman; and the 2025–27 Max Mara Art Prize for Women to Dian Suci.

== Personal life ==
Alemani is married to Massimiliano Gioni, an Italian curator and contemporary art critic. The couple has one son together and reside in the East Village, Manhattan in New York City.

== Writing ==
Alemani has written extensively for various publications, including Artforum.com and Mousse Magazine, and has a weekly column in D, Repubblica as of October 2019. She has authored, co-authored, edited or contributed entries to a number of books.

=== Selected books and contributions ===
- Alemani, Cecilia, ed. Il mondo magico: Padiglione Italia, Biennale Arte 2017. Venice: Marsilio, 2017. ISBN 9788831727204
- Alemani, Cecilia, ed. High Art: Public Art on the High Line. New York: NY, Skira Rizzoli, 2015. ISBN 0847845192
- Alemani, Cecilia. “The Solar Anus.” In Jakub Ziółkowski: 2000 words. Athens, DESTE Foundation, 2014. ISBN 6185039052
- Alemani, Cecilia, ed. The X Initiative Yearbook. Milan: Mousse Publishing, 2010. ISBN 9788896501290
- Alemani, Cecilia, Maurizio Cattelan, and Massimiliano Gioni. Charley Independents. Athens: Deste Foundation, 2010. ISBN 9781935202318
- Alemani, Cecilia and Massimiliano Gioni, ed. I’m Not There. Gwangju: Gwangju Biennale Foundation, 2010. ISBN 9788987719115
- Alemani, Cecilia, Andrea Bellini, and Lillian Davies, ed. Collecting Contemporary Art. Zürich: JRP Ringier, 2008. ISBN 3037640154
- Alemani, Cecilia. Arte Contemporanea 7: Ambiente. Milan: Mondadori Electa, 2008.
- Alemani, Cecilia. William Kentridge. Milan: Mondadori Electa, 2006. ISBN 8837043635
