= Idongesit =

Ibibio unisex given name

- Gender: Unisex

Origin
- Language: Ibibio
- Origin: Nigerian
- Meaning: comfort of the heart
- Region of origin: South- South Nigeria

Other names
- Derivatives: Idong, ID

Idongesit is a Nigerian unisex given name of Ibibio origin which means ''comfort of the heart''.

== Notable people with the name ==
- Idongesit Nkanga (born 1952), Nigerian former Air Commodore
- Victoria-Idongesit Udondian (born 1982), Nigerian artist
- Idongesit William Ibok (born 1985), Nigerian former professional basketball player
