= Som Supaparinya =

Thai artist

- Born: Sutthirat Supaparinya; October 19, 1973 (age 52); McCormick Hospital, Chiang Mai, Thailand
- Education: Chiang Mai University
- Website: https://atelierorange.info

Som Supaparinya (Thai: ส้ม ศุภปริญญา, b. 1973, Thailand) is a Thai installation artist and documentarian. Since 1995, her video and media art in Southeast Asia generally focuses on the entanglement of human and landscapes, as well as Thai history. She is also the recipient of the 2024 Han Nefkens Foundation – Southeast Asian Video Art Production Grant, and Frieze named her an artist to watch in 2026.

== Early life and education ==
Supaprinya was born in Lamphun in 1973. She graduated from the Faculty of Fine Arts, Chiang Mai University in 1997. She studied printmaking and painting in class, and also learned video, sound, and computer graphics. She then attended Hochschule für Grafik und Buchkunst Leipzig in Leipzig, Germany to study media arts as a recipient of the Katholischer Akademischer Ausländerdienst (KAAD) scholarship and the Free State Sachsen Funds (Fördermittel des Freistaates Sachsen).

== Career ==
Upon her return to Thailand, Supaparinya worked as an assistant to the Thai curator, Gridthiya Gaweewong, in Chiang Mai. She also lectured at Chiang Mai University's Painting Department. In 2003, Supaparinya joined Media Arts and Design, then a new department at Chiang Mai University. She would continue to lecture at art schools in Chiang Mai throughout 2000s.

Supaparinya was a 2005 "Imaging Our Mekong" media fellow and a 2010 Asian Cultural Council fellow at the International Studio & Curatorial Program in New York City. From 2011 to 2012, she co-organized the Lifescape Southeast Asian Film Festival with Payap University, Chiang Mai.

After participating Koganecho Bazaar Art Festival in 2011, Supaparinya cofounded the artist-run Chiang Mai Art Conversation in 2013 to collect, share, and produce local art activities including art map brochures and a website.

In 2021, Supaparinya participated in the Thai Biennale, showcasing her two-channel video Two Sides of the Moon.

In 2024, Supaparinya won the Han Nefkens Foundation – Southeast Asian Video Art Production Grant, awarding her $15,000 to create work to be exhibited at several partner institutions including the Jim Thompson Art Center, the Museion, the Hiroshima City Museum of Contemporary Art, the Kunsthal Charlottenborg, and the Rockbund Art Museum.

In 2026, Supaparinya held the solo exhibition MO NUM EN TS at the Jim Thompson Art Center in Bangkok, curated by Gaweewong. Reviewing it, Frieze wrote, "Exposing how power manifests through the censorship of knowledge, together Supaparinya’s two works create a space for audiences to contemplate the ways in which memory, knowledge production and the natural landscape intertwine."
