= Gridthiya Gaweewong =

Thai art curator

Gridthiya Gaweewong (Thai: กฤติยา กาวีวงศ์; born 1964) is a Thai curator and Artistic Director at the Jim Thompson Art Centre in Bangkok since 2007. She also serves as guest curator of MAIIAM Contemporary Art Museum, Chiang Mai. She is one of Thailand's top curators respected for her achievements, and recognised as "one of the most prominent curators working out of Southeast Asia today".

== Background ==
Gridthiya Gaweewong was born in Chiang Rai, Thailand in 1964.

Before pursuing her passion for art and making the transition to being a curator, Gaweewong worked as an English teacher and a librarian in a refugee camp in Phanat Nikhom. She later received a Masters of Arts in Administrations and Policy from the School of the Art Institute of Chicago in 1996.

Her doctoral dissertation looked at the 'invisible curatorial practices' or 'small narratives' in Thai and Southeast Asian art, with focus on the exhibition histories and artworlds of Southeast Asia. More specifically, she looked to various artist collectives in her research, such as the Chiang Mai Social Installation, ruangrupa's Militia and Video Art Festival, as well as TheatreWorks' Flying Circus Project.

She also presented an essay at a conference in Brazil, titled On Thai Artists and An Issue of Cultural Identity in 2001. In the essay, she exposited on Thailand's history, Buddhist philosophy and globalisation, and how these factors influenced various generations of Thai artists and filmmakers.

== Artistic collaborations ==
=== Founding of arts organisation, Project 304 ===
Project 304 was founded by curators such as Gaweewong and Edourd Mornaud, together with an eclectic group of Thai artists and art lecturers, including Montien Boonma, Kamol Phaosavasdi, Niti Wattuya, Chatchai Puipia, Micheal Shoawanasai, Apichatpong Weerasethakul, and Prapon Kumjim. The list of founders also included architect Sajeetip Nimvijit and art director Teerapole Ngamsinjamrus.

Project 304 functioned as an alternative and experimental arts space between 1996 and 2003. As a non-profit experimental art space, Project 304 focused on supporting emerging local artists, as well as established national and international artists. It also aimed to foster artistic dialogue, thinking about how art could be a means of bringing contemporary arts communities together, as well as fecundating appreciation and awareness of the arts in Thailand.

With an eye on social, cultural and political issues, concept-oriented exhibitions in Project 304 ranged from mediums of fine art such as painting and sculpture, to more contemporary mediums such as installations, print, photography, video and film, as well as performance.

In January 2026, Asia Art Archive acquired Gaweewong's personal and administrative materials and officially launched the Gridthiya Gaweewong Archive, a series meant to "reveal the evolution of Thailand’s contemporary art and its dialogue with the global art network."

=== Chiang Mai Social Installation Project ===
Gaweewong and Thai artist Navin Rawanchaikul have been core members of the Chiang Mai Social Installation Project since 1995. The Project was established by Thai artist Mit Jai Inn in 1992. The Project was primarily an outdoor sculpture festival but also served as an intervention to Bangkok's dominance as the centre of contemporary art and culture of Thailand. It sought to do so by situating Chiang Mai's rich culture, traditional craftsmanship and Thailand's large population of ethnic minority Yao people as an alternative to Bangkok, and distinguishing itself from white-cube based galleries and art museums.

=== Involvement with The Alternative Art School (TAAS) ===
The Alternative Art School was conceived as an online art school that was accessible and affordable to the arts community, and at the same time, a global alternative educational platform. Gaweewong was invited by Nato Thompson, another collaborator with her since the early 2000s, to join as a faculty member in TAAS.

This was also against a larger backdrop where the Thai education system was seen by Gaweewong as conservative, rigid and outdated. TAAS was hence to allow students and artists to gain accessibility to contemporary and global art education.

In her classes, she engaged with alternative art histories from the perspectives of Southeast Asia, as well as invited various artists as guest speakers from that region. Some of these speakers included Dinh Q, Lê, Grace Samboh and Ho Tzu Nyen. This was against the context of how art history from the western perspective would have meant white men's history and stories of "white men being taught by a bunch of white men."

=== Collaborations with Apichatpong Weerasethakul ===
Gaweewong and filmmaker Apichatpong Weerasethakul first met in art school in Chicago and have since then been long-term collaborators and interlocutors to each other. Some outcomes of their collaborations include co-founding and running the Bangkok Experimental Film Festival from 1997 to 2007, initiating several artistic projects together, as well as supporting younger artists and filmmakers in Thailand.

A conversation interview between them took place when Gaweewong was curator for Weerasethakul's travelling exhibition, Apichatpong Weerasethakul: The Serenity in Madness (2016-2020). The two spoke about American Expressionism which was seen briefly in Thailand before it disappeared. Gaweewong commented how this form of 'Thai' Abstract expressionism was not really Thai, since it came 'from Thai people who won Fulbright scholarships to the US during the Cold War period', and that such a style was seen to be imported back to Thailand.

== Other activities ==
In 2024, Gaweewong was part of the selection committee that chose Naomi Beckwith as the artistic director of Documenta Sixteen.

== Curatorial approaches ==
Following her doctoral dissertation, the idea of 'small narratives' has served as a parameter and departure point as part of her curatorial practice. These translate to featuring bottom-up approaches that strongly critique both state and institutions, to voices from below that contest grand narratives constructed by institutions in their specific contexts. In recent years, 'small narratives' have also included not merely art history and how it was written, but also look to socially engaged art that deal with problematic realities and histories, such as nationalist historiography.

Gaweewong's favorite moments of curatorial work are when meeting with artists in their studios before the birth of a project, which she sees as a privilege to be allowed to enter artists' contexts and worlds. This also allows her to understand both the environments and ideas that shaped the artists' mind and thinking process, as well as how they respond to their reality, community and family.

Her curatorial projects have revolved around social transformation confronting Thai contemporary artists and beyond since the Cold War. She also described herself as knowing where she stands-"on the borders, in the margins", and her love of work which paired aesthetics with subversive political content.

== Curated exhibitions ==
Exhibitions/Festivals	Year	Venue
Errata, Collecting Entanglements and Embodied Histories	2021-2022	MAIIAM Contemporary Art Museum, Chiangmai (initiated by Goethe Asia Pacific regional office, Singapore Art Museum, National Gallery Jakarta and Hamburger Bahnhof, Berlin)
12th Gwangju Biennale, Imagined Borders (served in the curatorial team)	2018	South Korea
Apichatpong Weerasethakul: The Serenity of Madness exhibition	2016-2019	MAIIAM Contemporary Art Museum, Chiangmai; also toured in Asia, Europe and US
'Unreal Asia' 55th International Short Film Festival Oberhausen (with David Teh)	2009	Oberhausen, Germany
Saigon Open City with Rirkrit Tiravanija	2006-2007	Ho Chi Minh City, Vietnam
The Bangkok Experimental Film Festival (with Apichatpong Weerasethakul)	1997-2007	Bangkok
Politics of Fun (with Ong Keng Sen)	2005	Haus der Kulturen der Welt, Berlin
Underconstruction	2000-2002	Tokyo
