= Tomorrow Girls Troop =

Feminist art collective

Tomorrow Girls Troop (明日少女隊, ashita shōjotai) is a worldwide fourth-wave socialist feminist art collective established in 2015, with a focus on intersectional feminist issues in the east Asian region and Japan in particular.

The work of the group re-frames activism as an artistic activity,

Even those projects that might be viewed as belonging to more traditional forms of activism—petitions, letter writing campaigns, etc—she argues are still related to art and visual culture. “It’s about representation. It’s about images.” - Natale Hegert interviewing group member Pink in Art Slant magazine.

== Projects ==
Shima city mascot - In 2015, Tomorrow Girls Troop led a campaign to rethink an overly sexualized female manga character "Megu Oshima", proposed as the mascot for Shima city. They received a response of more than 7000 signatories of support within a week.

Believe - In 2017, Tomorrow Girls Troop supported rape law reforms in Japan with a video performance titled Believe. The law reform was subsequently passed to increase prison sentences and easier conviction of offenders in a unanimous victory at the Diet June 2017.

Kojien Project - In 2017, Tomorrow Girls Troop challenged the definition of "Feminism" published in Kojien, widely regarded as Japan's most authoritative dictionary. The definition states, "1) An advocate for women’s liberation. An advocate for the expansion of women’s rights. 2) Colloquially, a man who is soft on women." Tomorrow Girls Troop argues that the first definition neglects the concept of equality and mistakenly suggests the project of feminism is to gain rights at the expense of men's and that the second definition should be deleted or clarified as an incorrect use of the word.

Against Forgetting - in February 2018, Tomorrow Girls troop orchestrated a collaborative performance to honor the story of Comfort Women who suffered in the second world war as well as contemporary victims of state-sponsored sexual violence.

== Exhibitions ==
In 2016, Tomorrow Girls Troop appeared alongside Yoshiko Shimada, Megumi Igarashi and others in an exhibition curated by Kate Just called "Feminist Fan in Japan and Friends"

A video of the art-action Believe along with artifacts from the action by Tomorrow Girls Troop appeared in the exhibition "Socially Engaged Art: A New Wave of Art for Social Change" at 3331 Arts Chiyoda, in Tokyo from February 18-March 5, 2017 along with the work of other artists including Ai Weiwei, Suzanne Lacy, Pedro Reyes (artist) and more.

In 2018, firstdraft gallery in Sydney Australia held a solo exhibition of Tomorrow Girls Troop curated by Alison Groves.

== Anonymity ==
Tomorrow Girls Troop group members use pink masks to protect their identities. TGT masks are "a hybrid of the Rabbit and the Silkworm. The silkworm is a symbol of women’s labor in Asia. Rabbits are often associated with women and are portrayed as cute, weak creatures." This tactic is analogous to the use of masks by earlier feminist art activists, the Guerrilla Girls.
