= Chiang Mai Social Installation =

Thai arts festival

The Chiang Mai Social Installation (CSMI) or Chiang Mai Jat Wang Sang Khom, was an art project and festival series founded by Mit Jai Inn, Uthit Atimana, Montien Boonma and Araya Rasjarmrearnsook. The festivals brought arts — particularly installation and performance works — out of traditional and commercial venues and into the streets and non-traditional venues of Chiang Mai, Thailand. The works were often live or otherwise ephemeral in nature, and never given market value.

== Founding ==
The Chiang Mai Social Installation was founded in 1992 by a group of artists and friends in Chiang Mai, Thailand. Uthit Atimana was an artist and lecturer at Chiang Mai University's Fine Arts Faculty; Mit Jai Inn was an assistant to Austrian artist Franz West, and who had recently returned to his hometown of Chiang Mai.

Founded on an ethos of friendship, the project epitomised some regional specificities, such as an emphasis on ephemerality and sociality. The interventions presented a self-funded, anarchic alternative to Southeast Asia's subsequently expanding biennial culture. Participating artist Arahmaiani who was based in Thailand after receiving death threats in Indonesia for her progressive views expressed that it was "important that we, as an artistic community, could support each other so that everyone could express themselves...I just felt there was a kind of freedom there at that time." Arahmaiani and several other CMSI participating artists also took part in an important festival growing in parallel Womanifesto.

== Festivals ==
The first CMSI festival, held November 1992 to February 1993, was called Art Festival: Temples & Cemeteries. The festival introduced art pieces into temples, civic squares, bridges, moats, and more. The festival would become known as the Chiang Mai Social Institution. This first festival included 16 artists such as Uthit Atimana, Kosit Juntaratip, Navin Rawanchaikul, Udom Chimpakdee, Tawatchai Pansawat, and Montien Boonma. All the artists were Thai, and many were from Chiang Mai University's Fine Arts Faculty.

The second CMSI event happened from mid-November 1993 until mid-February 1994, again in temples, graveyards, and public buildings throughout Chiang Mai, and was titled Chiang Mai Social Installation: Second Art Festival: Temples, Cemeteries, Private Residences, Public Buildings, Streets, Bridges, Walls, Rivers and Canals, Open Spaces. In this iteration, fifty artists — both local and international — participated, including Narupon Buranabanyat, Tawatchai Homthong, Montien Boonma, Udom Chimpakdee, Joan Grounds, Thatree Pokavanich, Tei Kobayashi, Apichat Udomchai, Mit Jai Inn, Sarawoot Tongchampa, Kosit Juntaratip, Navin Rawanchaikul, Kitti Maleepan, Araya Rasdjarmrearnsook, Theerapong Takerd, Nigel Helyer, Vasan Sitthiket, Komsan Nookaew, Chatchawan Nilsakul, Worapoj Preabjariyawat, Pittawat Tripopsawat, Rakon Lakon Group, Supachai Satsara, Kade Javanalikhikara, Preecha Punklam, Sunthorn Meesri. Talks and discussions involved Nidhi Eoseewong, Saneh Jamarik, Seksan Prasertkul, Tani Arata, Kimio Tsuchiya, Chieo Senzaki, and Sulak Sivaraksa. The budget was reported to be around 100,000 baht.

The third CMSI festival titled Chiang Mai Social Installation: Third Art Cultural Festival: Temples, Cemeteries, Private Residences, Public Buildings, Streets, Bridges, Walls, Rivers and Canals, Open Spaces ran from mid-November 1995 until mid-February 1996 and included artists such as Lee Wen, Doris Kraushaar, Suttisak Phutararak, Ekachai Luadsoongnern, Paisan Plienbangchang, Wunlop Manyam, Ingrid H. Klauser, Nopparat Chokchaichutikul, Akatsuki Harada, Yvonne Parent, Eng Hwee Chu, Yutaka Sone, Komson Nookiew, Satoshi Hirose, Tang Da Wu, Pierto Pellini and Yola Berbesz, Jay Koh, Tawatchai Homthong, Maethee Srisuthasinee, Tatsuo Inagaki, Vincent Leow Kong Yam, Arahmaiani, Nilofar Akmut, Janice Sommerville, Leen Emmerzael, Liz Miller, Chitti Kasemkitvatana, Wattana Wattanapun, Toeingam Srisubut, Mari Zirus, Junya Yamaide, Masato Nakamura, Toi Ungkavatanapong, Tan Chin Kuan. Also during the 1995-1996 festival, artist Navin Rawanchaikul set up Navin Driving School, teaching driving to local residents who wanted to learn. Rawanchaikul considered this teaching as "an art-making process."

The fourth and final iteration of CMSI occurred from December 1, 1997 through January 7, 1998, with the title POVERTY. It featured artists such as Sanya Santives, Ben Patterson, Rolf Hinterecker, Sompong Tawee, Mongkol Plienbangchang, Anja Ibsch, Jaksaree Suvanasare, Carola Willbrand, Frank Köllges, Noppadol Tirataradol, Enno Stahl, Kritsana Soonthornpak, Preeraphong Boomjanta, Luka Boonkerd Kaewdee and others.

The CMSI stopped its official programming in 1998, though young artists attempted to revive the collective with arts programming in 2003.

=== Week of Cooperative Suffering ===
In January 1995, co-founder Mit Jai Inn was concerned that the festival was becoming "too exhibition-centric," and thus introduced the spin-off event Week of Joint Sorrow (changed to Week of Cooperative Suffering) in order to focus more on public engagement. The Week included nightly gatherings where well-known local entities and passersby could speak to a crowd.

The Week occurred in the first weeks of 1995, 1996, and 1998.

== See also ==
- Documentary talk "Histories of Chiang Mai Social Installation held in 2018 at Wat Umong Phutthatham on the occasion of the publication of Artist-to-Artist: Independent Art Festivals in Chiang Mai 1992–98, and features Uthit Atimana, David Teh, David Morris, and a performance by Narumol Thammaprusa
- Bangkok Biennial
- Thai art
