= Rachel Fallon =

Rachel Fallon (born 1971) is an Irish artist. She works across sculpture, drawing, photography, and performance art. Her practice is materially focused and explores themes of domestic protection and defense, motherhood, and the experiences of women living in society. She is involved in campaigns for women’s and minority rights in Ireland. She has collaborated with activists and Irish women artists. She was born in Dublin, where she continues to live.

== Career ==
In 2021, Fallon collaborated with Alice Maher on The Map, a large-scale tapestry created for The Magdalene Series at Rua Red. Coordinating remote work during lockdown, they exchanged fabric by post and combined sewing, painting, crochet and appliqué in a process that recalls histories of women’s labour in homes and religious institutions in Ireland. Simultaneously incorporating humor despite its serious themes, the work addresses harms experienced by women in Ireland, including institutional abuse in Mother and Baby Homes and Magdalene laundries and discrimination in employment, marriage, and reproductive healthcare laws. It is inspired by medieval Mappa Mundi and the seventeenth-century Carte de Tendre. It has been exhibited at OFF-Biennale in Budapest, IAC in New York, and The Dock in Leitrim.

In 2023, Fallon was invited to undertake a residency at the Irish Museum of Modern Art. That year, she also began Jelen Vagyok / I Am Present, a collaborative, social activist performance work addressing queer and female representation in public spaces.The work was commissioned by Budapest Galéria and Kiscelli Múzeum in Hungary and has been performed in Budapest and Manhattan.

Fallon received an invitation to present her work with Maher at the 61st Venice Biennale in 2026, as part of In Minor Keys, curated by Koyo Kouoh.

Public collections that hold Fallon’s work include the Irish Museum of Modern Art, Arts Council of Ireland, National Museum of Ireland and the Museum of Modern Art in Warsaw.
