= BlaxTARLINES KUMASI =

blaxTARLINES KUMASI is an artist collective, organizational network and art incubator based in Kumasi, Ashanti region of Ghana. It was invited to participate in the main exhibit of the 2026 Venice Biennale and was ranked #69 on ArtReview’s Power 100 ranking of the most influential figures in contemporary art.

== History ==
The collective began in the Department of Painting and Sculpture at the Kwame Nkrumah University of Science and Technology (KNUST), a Ghanaian tertiary institution in Kumasi, which features art. Kąrî'kạchä Seid'ou conceived the foundational Emancipatory Art Teaching Project (starting in 2,003), which directly birthed the collective. Since then, the artists' network has grown to cover five continents.

The project was one of six groups invited to participate in the 2026 Venice Biennale in 2025. It brought the project SLOW DOWN: ~~CATTLE~~ BATTLE AHEAD, whose title was inspired by a 1995 painting of the same name by Kąrî'kạchä Seid'ou, an African historian and artist.

== Mission ==
The collective defines itself as an “open-source” artistic coalition, an educational experiment, a working movement, and a sharing economy.
