= Georgina Maxim =

Georgina Maxim (born in 1980) is a Zimbabwean artist and curator. She makes textile works from second-hand clothing using embroidery, sewing and weaving.

== Early life and education ==
Maxim was born in Harare, Zimbabwe, in 1980. She studied applied art, design and education at Chinhoyi University of Technology. She later completed a master's degree in African Verbal and Visual Arts at the University of Bayreuth in Germany, supported by a KAAD scholarship.

After studying at Chinhoyi, Maxim taught visual arts at Prince Edward School in Harare and worked at Gallery Delta.

== Career ==
Maxim worked at Gallery Delta between 1999 and 2012, alongside her teaching and artistic practice. In 2012, she co-founded Village Unhu, an artist space in Harare, with artist Misheck Masamvu. Village Unhu provides studios, exhibitions, workshops and residencies for artists in Zimbabwe.

Maxim uses discarded clothing to make textile works, often cutting garments apart and reassembling them through stitching and weaving. In a 2019 interview with Contemporary And, she discussed the time involved in making her work and her interest in the histories of the garments she uses.

In 2018, Maxim was nominated for the Henrike Grohs Art Award. The following year, she represented Zimbabwe at the 58th Venice Biennale in Soko Risina Musoro (The Tale Without a Head), alongside Kudzanai Violet Hwami, Neville Starling and Cosmas Shiridzinomwa. She also was selected for a residency at the Bag Factory Artists' Studios in Johannesburg in 2020.

In 2022, her work appeared in Eternally Yours at Somerset House in London and O Quilombismo: Of Resisting and Insisting at Haus der Kulturen der Welt in Berlin in 2023. In 2024, Maxim participated in Unravel: The Power and Politics of Textiles in Art at the Barbican Centre in London and the Stedelijk Museum in Amsterdam.

Maxim was included in In Minor Keys, the central exhibition of the 61st Venice Biennale in 2026. She also presented Borrowed Books and Underlined Statements (2023–2026), an installation of stitched fabric panels containing passages from borrowed books, and 33 Letters of Knowing You Will Reply (2026), which incorporates correspondence with her late sister and fragments of her clothing.

== Selected exhibitions ==
- 2019: Soko Risina Musoro (The Tale Without a Head), Zimbabwe Pavilion, 58th Venice Biennale, Venice, Italy.
- 2022: Eternally Yours, Somerset House, London, United Kingdom.
- 2023: O Quilombismo: Of Resisting and Insisting, Haus der Kulturen der Welt, Berlin, Germany.
- 2024: Unravel: The Power and Politics of Textiles in Art, Barbican Centre, London, and Stedelijk Museum, Amsterdam.
- 2026: In Minor Keys, 61st Venice Biennale, Venice, Italy.
