= Gladys Mgudlandlu =

South African artist and educator

Gladys Nomfanekiso Mgudlandlu

Gladys Nomfanekiso Mgudlandlu (1917 — 17 February 1979) was a South African artist and educator. Noted as one of the first African women in South Africa to hold a solo exhibition, she was a pioneer in visual arts in her country, for which she was given the Presidential Order of Ikhamanga in Silver. She drew influences from her cultural background and the landscape around her.

== Early life ==
Gladys Mgudlandlu was born in the Peddie district near Grahamstown in 1917 (some sources give 1923 or 1925). She was raised mainly by her grandmother, who taught her traditional painting styles from their Xhosa and Fingo heritage, and about the birds native to their region. She qualified as a teacher in 1941, at Lovedale College. She was also registered as a nurse-in-training in Cape Town in the 1940s. Mgudlandlu worked as an art teacher in Langa, Cape Town at the Athlone Bantu Community School for fifteen years. However, when the Bantu Education Act of 1953 was enforced, Mgudlandlu was not allowed to teach at the school under the apartheid regime. Prior to dedicating herself to art full-time, she went to teach briefly at schools in Nyanga and Gugulethu.

== Career ==
Mgudlandlu taught at Athlone Bantu Community School until 1953, and at Nyanga West Primary School from 1953. She painted at night after work. Mgudlandlu’s style was influenced by her grandmother’s indigenous painting techniques. As a child, her grandmother, a muralist, taught her about visual art. Her grandmother’s death, seen by some as not only a great loss but a liberation for Mugudlandlu, sparked an artistic awakening. Mgudlandlu draws from her rural childhood and depicts her memories of youth in a dream-like state. Her works feature indigenous birds, rural landscapes, and depictions of vibrant African villages. She loved birds and was often called "the bird lady". In an interview with the Sunday Chronicle, she said "Birds have always been my companions. I am a very lonely person. They are the only real friends that I have had. Sometimes I think I should have been a bird. I even paint like a bird. You will notice that all my landscapes are done from a bird’s view, high up and far away". She described her painting style as a mix between Impressionism and Expressionism, although a “dreamer imaginist" is what she liked to be called. With just a paraffin lamp, the artist would create art. She never used electricity and would continue this tradition throughout her career. Her work contained two main vantage points: ground level and a bird's eye view. When painting from a ground level vantage point, she would paint animals while her high vantage points painting's subjects were landscapes. These landscapes were inspired by her childhood ventures, climbing up on mountains and rocks. She was exhibiting in the early 1960s. While many people revered her and found her work to be a beautiful representation of South Africa, Bessie Head, one of Botswana's most influential writers, commented from exile in Botswana in 1963 that Mgudlandlu's work was "escapist," "childish," and aimed at white audiences. Her introductory solo exhibition was in Cape Town in 1961 at the Liberal Party offices in Parliament Street. Before this initial exhibition of Mgudlandlu's work, no black female artist had been recognized exhibiting in a Western art tradition, they had all remained anonymous. The medium of the works exhibited were gouache. After being injured in a car accident in 1971, Mgudlandlu stopped painting and showing her works.

== Artwork ==
- Two Girls (1967)
- Mini Girls (1971)
- Rocky Outcrop (1964)
- Houses in the Township (1970)
- Houses in the Hills (1971)
- Mother and Chicks (1963)
- Honey Birds (1961)
- Landscape with Aloes (1962)
- The Fall (1962)
- Two White Birds Flying Over Mountain and Trees (1962)
- Two Blue Birds "Birds" (1962)
- Girl Carrying Wood (1970)
- Gugulethu (1964)

== Exhibitions ==
1961:Room 404, 47 Parliament Street, Cape Town (solo). Port Elizabeth (solo). 1962:Rodin Gallery, Cape Town (solo). 1963:Dam (Art SA Today). Rodin Gallery, Cape Town (solo). 1965: (solo).

== Death and legacy ==
Mgudlandlu died at Gugulethu in 1979, aged 61 years. In 2007, she was awarded the Presidential Order of Ikhamanga in Silver for her contributions to South African art.

A biography by Elza Miles, Nomfanekiso Who Paints at Night: The Art of Gladys Mgudlandlu was published in 2003. A show of works by Mgudlandlu and Valerie Desmore, titled "A Fragile Archive," was on display at Johannesburg Art Gallery in 2012. Multimedia artist Kemang Wa Lehulere made "The Bird Lady" (2015), a short documentary about Mgudlandlu. Wa Lehulere additionally engaged with Mgudlandlu's legacy in his Berlin exhibition Bird Song in 2017.

Works by Mgudlandlu are in the collections of the Nelson Mandela Metropolitan Art Museum.

Mgudlandlu herself and her exhibitions have provided historians and the general public with the current understanding of rural and township life in the recent past. This is because she drew inspiration from her Xhosa heritage and the customs/rituals that she grew up learning . Unfortunately, many of her works have deteriorated over time because they were primarily in gouache on card.

== Two Blue Birds ==
Gladys Mgudlandlu often depicted birds, the subject matter of her gouache on card painting Two Blue Birds, a work shown in her 1962 Exhibition at the Rodin Gallery in Cape Town. In a Mgudlandlu quote shared by Michael Stevenson, Mgudlandlu expresses her affinity with the creatures, "Birds have always been my companions… I am a very lonely person. They are the only real friends I have had. Sometimes I think I should have been a bird. I even paint like a bird. You will notice that my landscapes are done from a bird’s view, high up and far away"

== Houses in the Hills ==
Houses in the Hills(1971) depicts ugly and oppressive houses that are the antithesis of the organic homes of the traditional African homesteads. These houses are the products of apartheid and "glare accusingly at the viewer". The discord between the yellow-browns and blue-purples serve to accentuate the harsh mood.

== Gugulethu ==
Gugulethu (1964) is a work similar to many other landscapes by Mgudlandlu in which she depicts houses that are the results of the apartheid. These types of works can be seen as idealizations, but looking closer reveals that Mgudlandlu had constructed them to convey intentional bizarre qualities. Her work was deemed intuitive and not intentional, meaning her choices were often looked over. The clear nod to impressionism and post-impressionism is seen in the cubism-esque, repetitive and exploratory brushstrokes that can also be found in European post-impressionist artist's works such as Cezanne. The chaos and disorder of this township "play upon the rules of perspective". Her bird's eye view perspective can be seen here and is thought of as an expression of her personal sadness and disappointment with these living conditions, as well as a "desire for liberation".
