= BuBu de la Madeleine =

Japanese visual artist (born 1961)

BuBu de la Madeleine (born 1961) is a Japanese visual artist and drag performer. Her work encompasses videos, texts, performances, and installation art pieces that engage with politically charged themes with an ironic sensibility. She currently lives in Nara, Japan.

== Career ==
Bubu de La Madeleine was born in Osaka, Japan in 1961. La Madeleine began her artistic career in 1992 when she joined the Kyoto-based performance group Dumb Type, which was known for using technology to combine political critiques with a caustic style of humor. She specifically performed in the group’s S/N production from 1994 to 1996, which has toured 20 cities in 15 countries.

La Madeleine subsequently departed Dumb Type to pursue a solo art practice in which she engaged in the mediums of performance, installation, text, and video. Her work is informed by her lived experiences as a sex worker as well as a family caregiver. In 1998, she collaborated with artist and art historian Yoshiko Shimada on the exhibition Made in Occupied Japan, which used gender subversion to examine how American occupation influenced social conceptions of femininity and sexuality in postwar Japan. This collaboration was the inspiration for her later collage piece Meiji Drag: Anti-Imperial Sugoroku (2025). Her work with Shimada was also featured in the Biennale Arte.

The mermaid is a recurring motif in her work. At the 61st Venice Biennale in 2026, she presented her 2022, A Mermaid’s Territory – Flags and Internal Organs, a work which uses the mermaid’s shedding scales to symbolize her experiences of skin shedding caused by a dermatological disease, as well as undergoing medical procedures such as a hysterectomy and an oophorectomy.

La Madeleine is an active participant in civil activism, engaging in support for sex workers and people living with HIV/AIDS. La Madeleine also contributes to queer nightlife culture in Japan by regularly performing as a drag queen and drag king in clubs.
