= Léonard Pongo =

- Born: 1988 (age 37–38); Liège, Belgium
- Education: Maastricht University
- Known for: Photography, film
- Notable work: The Uncanny (2011–); Primordial Earth (2017–)
- Awards: Prix de l'Organisation internationale de la Francophonie, Rencontres de Bamako (2019); Contemporary African Photography Prize (2023)

Léonard Pongo (born 1988) is a Belgian-Congolese photographer, filmmaker and visual artist. Born in Liège, Belgium, he lives and works between Brussels and Kinshasa, Democratic Republic of the Congo.

== Early life and education ==
Pongo was born in 1988 to a Congolese father and Belgian mother and grew up in Belgium. He studied political and social sciences at Maastricht University, graduating in 2009, before studying photography at an art school in Brussels. During his university studies, he worked on a photography project in Central Europe inspired by the novelist Milan Kundra, and later decided to pursue a career as a photographer.

Pongo first traveled to the Democratic Republic of the Congo in 2011, initially intending to photograph the country's presidential election. He stayed with members of his father's family and began photographing everyday life in Kinshasa.

== Career ==
Photographs made during Pongo's visits to the Democratic Republic of the Congo became The Uncanny, a long-term project begun in 2011. The series received a POPCAP award in 2014 and was exhibited at Contretype in Brussels in 2015. Pongo continued working on the project during repeated visits to the country, traveling to Kinshasa, Katanga and Kasaï. GOST Books published The Uncanny as a monograph in 2023, featuring an essay written by philosopher Nadia Yala Kisukidi.

Pongo began Primordial Earth in 2017, in which he photographed landscapes in the Democratic Republic of the Congo and later incorporated moving images and textiles. Primordial Earth was shown at the Lubumbashi Biennale and at the Rencontres de Bamako in 2019, where Pongo received the Prix de l'Organisation internationale de la Francophonie.

Pongo received a Getty Images Reportage Grant in 2018. He was one of five winners of the Contemporary African Photography Prize in 2023. That year, photographs from Primordial Earth appeared in A World in Common: Contemporary African Photography at Tate Modern in London.

His experimental film Tales from the Source premiered at Doclisboa in 2024. The film was made in the Democratic Republic of the Congo as part of the continuing Primordial Earth project.

In 2026, Pongo participated in In Minor Keys, the central exhibition of the 61st Venice Biennale, where he presented Inhabiting the Landscape (2023). He also participated in the Democratic Republic of the Congo's first national pavilion at the Biennale.

Pongo teaches documentary photography at the Academy of fine arts in Kinshasa and is an associate researcher at the Royal Academy of Fine Arts Antwerp.
