= Kemang Wa Lehulere =

Kemang We Lehulere
- Born: 1984 (age 41–42); Cape Town, South Africa

Kemang We Lehulere (born 1984) is a South African artist. He works in a variety of media including sculpture, installation, drawing, painting, photographs, and performance. His art practice often utilizes everyday objects and visual references to explore critical themes relating to South Africa, including racial oppression, violence, identity, censorship, educational discrimination, and broader issues of politics, systemic control, and representation.

== Early life and education ==
Wa Lehulere was born in Cape Town, South Africa in 1984 and grew up in Gugulethu. His mother was Tswana and his father was Irish. Several members of his family worked in theatre, and Wa Lehulere began acting in high school.

He studied at the Community Arts Project in Cape Town and later earned a Bachelor of Arts in Fine Arts from the University of the Witwatersrand in 2011.

== Career ==
In 2006, Wa Lehulere co-founded Gugulective, an artist collective based in Gugulethu. He was also a founding member of the Center for Historical Reenactments in Johannesburg.

In 2011, Wa Lehulere was featured in the 11th Lyon Biennale. He also was included in the New Museum Triennial in New York in 2012 and the 8th Berlin Biennale in 2014. After receiving the 2015 Standard Bank Young Artist Award for Visual Art, he presented the touring exhibition History Will Break Your Heart, which included work by South African painter Gladys Mgudlandlu alongside his own installations, video and everyday objects.

In 2017, Deutsche Bank presented Bird Song, Wa Lehulere's first institutional solo exhibition in Germany, at its Kunsthalle in Berlin. The exhibition included a gallery based on his research into Mgudlandlu. That year, Performa commissioned I cut my skin to liberate the splinter, a performance presented at the Connelly Theater in New York.

His more recent exhibitions included Not Quite Like the Other Day at A4 Arts Foundation in Cape Town in 2019 and Bring Back Lost Love at the Kunsthalle Bern in 2023. In 2026, Wa Lehulere participated in In Minor Keys, the central exhibition of the 61st Venice Biennale, where he presented I Bleach My Words for Your Comfort.

== Selected works ==
- Remembering the Future of a Hole as a Verb 2 (2010), video
- History Will Break Your Heart (2015), installation
- Bird Song (2017), exhibition and installation works
- I cut my skin to liberate the splinter (2017), performance
- I Bleach My Words for Your Comfort (2026), installation

== Awards ==
Wa Lehulere won the inaugural Spier Contemporary Award in 2007 and the MTN New Contemporaries Award in 2010. In 2012, he received the Tollman Award for Visual Arts and was also the recipient of an Ampersand Foundation residency in New York. His international recognition continued in 2013 when he was one of two young artists selected for the 15th Baloise Art Prize at Art Basel; subsequently, he won the first International Tiberius Art Award in Dresden in 2014 and was named the Standard Bank Young Artist for Visual Arts in 2015. In 2017, Wa Lehulere was named Deutsche Bank’s Artist of the Year and received the fourth Malcolm McLaren Award. He was also shortlisted for the Future Generation Art Prize during this period.
