= Wardha Shabbir =

Pakistani visual artist (born 1987)

- Born: 1987 (age 38–39); Lahore, Pakistan
- Education: National College of Arts

Wardha Shabbir (born 1987) is a Pakistani visual artist and contemporary miniature painter. Born and based in Lahore, she works primarily in gouache on paper and has also produced large-scale installations. She was a finalist for the Jameel Prize 5 and was also featured in the Lahore Biennale, the Asia Pacific Triennial and the 61st Venice Biennale.

== Early life and education ==
Shabbir was born in Lahore, Pakistan, in 1987. She studied miniature painting at the National College of Arts (NCA) in Lahore, graduating with honours in 2011 and receiving the Principal's Honour Award. During her studies she participated in an exchange programme at the École des Beaux-Arts in Paris.

Shabbir later taught at the National College of Arts, where she served as a visiting lecturer and assistant professor.

== Career ==
In 2013, Shabbir undertook a residency at FLACC in Genk, Belgium. She participated in the Dhaka Art Summit in 2014 and attended the Slade School of Fine Art's Summer Intensive programme in London in 2016.

Shabbir was one of eight finalists for the Jameel Prize 5, organized by the Victoria and Albert Museum in London. The exhibition, held at the V&A in 2018, included her 2017 painting Two Pillars. The exhibit later travelled to the Jameel Arts Centre in Dubai in 2019.

For the first Lahore Biennale in 2018, Shabbir created The Way to Paradise, a site-specific installation in Bagh-e-Jinnah. The work extended elements of Indo-Persian miniature painting into a large-scale installation.

Her solo exhibitions have included In a Free State at Grosvenor Gallery in London in 2019, Green Matter at Canvas Gallery in Karachi in 2021 and The Water You Seek at Grosvenor Gallery in 2022.

Shabbir's work was included in the 11th Asia Pacific Triennial of Contemporary Art at the Queensland Art Gallery and Gallery of Modern Art (QAGOMA) in Brisbane in 2024. She presented paintings including Paths to Portals and Anatomy of Survival, both made that year. QAGOMA acquired works by Shabbir for its collection in 2024.

In 2025, she participated in the 32nd Pontevedra Biennial in Spain. The following year, Shabbir was included in In Minor Keys, the central exhibition of the 61st Venice Biennale.

Her work is held in the collections of the British Museum and QAGOMA.

== Selected works ==
- Two Pillars (2017), gouache on paper
- The Way to Paradise (2018), site-specific installation
- Building My Own Sanctuary (2022), gouache on paper
- Paths to Portals (2024), gouache on paper
- Anatomy of Survival (2024), gouache on paper
