= Hala Schoukair =

Hala Schoukair (born 1957) is a Lebanese painter and printmaker. Born in Beirut, she studied cinema in Paris and later lived in New York before returning to Lebanon in 2019. She is the daughter of artist Saloua Raouda Choucair.

== Early life and education ==
Schoukair was born in Beirut in 1957, the only child of Saloua Raouda Choucair and journalist Youssef Choucair. She received a diploma from the École Supérieure d'Études Cinématographiques in Paris in 1979 and a master's degree in the history of cinema from the Sorbonne in 1980. After graduation, she worked in film production.

Schoukair moved to New York and studied at the Art Students League of New York between 2001 and 2007. She returned to Lebanon in 2019.

== Career ==
Schoukair exhibited paintings in the United States during the 1980s and 1990s. In 2014, Agial Art Gallery in Beirut presented Grains of Light, her first solo exhibition in Lebanon. The exhibition included more than 70 of her acrylic works on paper and canvas.[6] She returned to Agial in 2017 with the solo exhibition You Promised Me Spring.[7]

In 2019, Schoukair established the Saloua Raouda Choucair Foundation in Ras El Metn. The foundation opened a museum devoted to her mother's work there in June 2024. Schoukair serves as president of the foundation.

Schoukair’s paintings were also included in Intimate Garden Scene at the Sursock Museum in Beirut in 2023–2024. In 2024, the Institut du monde arabe in Paris included her work in Arabofuturs: Science-fiction et nouveaux imaginaires. Her work entered the collection of the Los Angeles County Museum of Art that year.

In 2025, Saleh Barakat Gallery presented Schoukair's solo exhibition The Affirmative Happiness of a Green Dot in Beirut. In 2026, she participated in In Minor Keys, the central exhibition of the 61st Venice Biennale.

== Selected exhibitions ==
- Grains of Light, Agial Art Gallery, Beirut (2014)
- You Promised Me Spring, Agial Art Gallery, Beirut (2017)
- Intimate Garden Scene, Sursock Museum, Beirut (2023–2024)
- Arabofuturs: Science-fiction et nouveaux imaginaires, Institut du monde arabe, Paris (2024)
- The Affirmative Happiness of a Green Dot, Saleh Barakat Gallery, Beirut (2025)
- In Minor Keys, 61st Venice Biennale (2026)
