= Sawangwongse Yawnghwe =

- Born: 1971 (age 54–55); Shan State
- Other name: Huung Hpa
- Occupation: Contemporary artist

Sawangwongse Yawnghwe (born 1971) is a Burmese contemporary artist. His artistic practice spans paintings, installations, and cartographic works that address such as state violence, erased minority histories, and the geopolitical complexities of Myanmar.

He currently lives and works between the Netherlands and Chiang Mai, Thailand.

== Early Life and Education ==
Yawnghwe was born in 1971 in Na Lek village in Shan State, in an area then controlled by Shan rebels. His grandfather, Sao Shwe Thaik, was the first president of the Union of Burma after independence from Britain. Sao Shwe Thaik died in prison after the 1962 military coup led by Ne Win.

Yawnghwe's father, Chao Tzang Yawnghwe, helped establish the Shan State Army in 1964. His mother joined him in the Shan Hills in 1969. After Yawnghwe's birth, the family moved to Thailand. Following an assassination attempt against his father, the family received political asylum in Canada when Yawnghwe was thirteen.

Yawnghwe studied at Emily Carr University of Art and Design in Vancouver and Concordia University in Montreal.

Kerstin Winking, a curator and scholar based in Amsterdam, along with Dev Benegal, co-directed Painting Exile (2022), a film about Yawnghwe .

== Exhibitions ==
Throughout his artistic career, Yawnghwe has exhibited internationally, including at the Venice Biennale (2026), Artes Mundi in Wales (2026), Berlin Biennale (2025), RHIZOMA Biennale (2025), Thailand Biennale Chiang Rai (2023), ART SG (2024), Singapore Biennale (2022), Art Basel Hong Kong (2022), Kathmandu Triennale (2022), Dhaka Art Summit in Bangladesh (2020 and 2018), 1st Bangkok Biennale (2018), the 9th Asia Pacific Triennial of Contemporary Art in Australia (2018), the 12th Gwangju Biennale Exhibition in South Korea (2018), Qualandiya International in Jerusalem (2016), Steirischer Herbst in Austria (2016) and Dak’Art in Senegal (2016).

His works have been shown at HKW in Berlin, Museum Arnhem in the Netherlands, Guangdong Times Museum in Guangzhou, National Museum of Modern Art in Warsaw, MAIIAM Contemporary Art Museum in Chiang Mai, Museum of Fine Arts in Taichung, Bangkok Art and Culture Centre, Goethe-Institut in Myanmar, Asia Culture Center in Gwangju, Irish Museum of Modern Art in Dublin, Institute of Modern Art in Brisbane, and Stedelijk Museum Buereau Amsterdam. Many of his works are housed in the MAIIAM Contemporary Art Museum and Singapore Art Museum collections.

Yawnghwe is represented by TKG+ in Taipei, Nova Contemporary in Bangkok, and Jane Lombard Gallery in New York.

=== 2026 Venice Biennale ===
Exhibiting in the Central Pavilion of the 61st Venice Biennale, Yawnghwe presented a body of paintings and sculptures examining genocidal economies and the conditions that bring them into being. The selection includes People’s Desire (2018), a six-metre-long installation of 2,500 crudely modelled clay figurines, among them depictions of families that are walking or floating in boats in a mass exodus. Beginning in 2014, Yawnghwe described the persecution of the Rohingya as genocidal and connected it to the broader history of land and resource expropriation affecting Karen, Kachin, and Shan peoples under military rule.

In his painting works, Which Way to Land? An Open Question about Burma’s Fate (2023) and The Bed of Gold Stream (2024), Yawnghwe reworks colonial maps and historical photographs of the Shan minority as a way of reclaiming land, history, resources and intellectual ownership. In The Prince’s Manual, or: The Complete Idiot’s Guide to Burma Post Coup Revolution (2024), Yawnghwe confronts the political and social realities of Myanmar in the aftermath of the 2021 coup, which involved aerial bombardment, scorched-earth tactics, ethnic armies, and revolutionary struggle. The two Parallax canvases juxtapose Burma with Ukraine, Gaza and the West Bank. The Idiot’s Parallax (2025) frames decolonization as “a violent event that turns the outward force inward, risking self-violence.”

== Awards ==
He was a finalist for the 13th Benesse Prize in 2022 and the Artes Mundi 11 Prize in 2026.
