= Mohammed Z. Rahman =

British-Bengali artist (born 1997)

Mohammed Z. Rahman (born 1997) is a British-Bengali artist and writer based in London. A self-taught painter, he also works in sculpture, installation, illustration and zines. His work has been exhibited at Tate Britain, Whitechapel Gallery and the Venice Biennale.

== Early life and education ==
Rahman was born in London in 1997 to parents from Bangladesh. He began painting as a teenager, sometimes working on small objects including matchboxes. He later studied social anthropology at SOAS University of London.

While at university, Rahman made zines and sold postcard prints of his paintings. In 2017, he worked in his uncle's curry restaurant in Essex, before he made the triptych Cook, Serve, Become a Man (2018).

== Career ==
In 2022, curator Eliel Jones invited Rahman to participate in the Brent Biennial after encountering his work on Instagram. Rahman's contribution, Unfurnished, was shown at Kingsgate Project Space. His first solo exhibition with Phillida Reid, City of Burrows, opened in London in 2023.

In 2024, Rahman presented Awake at Art Basel Hong Kong and A Flame is a Petal at Phillida Reid. That year, Tate acquired his paintings The Lovers and The Spaghetti House through the Frieze Tate Fund, while the Government Art Collection acquired Divali.

Peer presented Remember to Live, Rahman's first solo exhibition in a public gallery, in 2025. The exhibition consisted of paintings made on canvas, boards and found wooden crates. Later that year, he presented Hearthside at Whitechapel Gallery and at Art Basel Miami Beach.

In 2026, Rahman participated in In Minor Keys, the central exhibition of the 61st Venice Biennale, with the installation Rolling Heart. Tate Britain presented his solo exhibition Never the Same as part of its Art Now program from June to November 2026. The exhibition included new paintings alongside The Lovers and The Spaghetti House from Tate's collection.

== Selected works ==
- Cook, Serve, Become a Man (2018), painting
- Unfurnished (2022), painting
- Divali (2024), painting
- The Lovers (2024), painting
- The Spaghetti House (2024), painting
- Rolling Heart (2026), installation
