= Valerie Desmore =

South African artist & designer, based in London (1925–2008)

Valerie Elizabeth Desmore (1925 — 14 August 2008) was a South African artist and designer, based in London.

== Early life ==
Desmore was born in Cape Town, South Africa. Her parents were teachers; her father, Abe J. B. Desmore, was described as a "leading Coloured intellectual" who held a master's degree in education from the Teachers College, Columbia University. Facing limited opportunities for further education, she left South Africa for London in 1946, to study at the Slade School of Fine Art. After leaving the Slade, she studied in Vienna with Oskar Kokoschka.

== Career ==
While she was a teenager, in 1943, Desmore had a public exhibition of her art at the Herbert Stanley Argus Gallery, which was probably the first such show by a woman artist classified as coloured in Cape Town. In 1951 she began to study fashion design, and produced several collections in the 1960s. She opened a shop in Covent Garden in 1978, and designed clothing for Marks and Spencer for eighteen years, painting in her spare time.

She returned to South Africa to visit in 1997, when her work was featured in an exhibit called Land and Lives curated by Elza Miles.

== Legacy ==
Desmore died in London in 2008. In 2012, curator Nontobeko Ntombela produced an exhibition at the Johannesburg Art Gallery, called A Fragile Archive, featuring the works of Gladys Mgudlandlu and Desmore.
