= Adebunmi Gbadebo =

Adebunmi Gbadebo (born 1992) is an American multimedia artist who works in ceramics, printmaking and textiles. Her work has been exhibited at the Metropolitan Museum of Art, the Biennale of Sydney and the Venice Biennale. She currently lives and works in Philadelphia.

== Early life and education ==
Gbadebo was born in Livingston, New Jersey. She is of Nigerian and African American descent. Her mother enrolled her in art classes at the Newark Museum when she was three years old.

She earned a Bachelor of Fine Arts from the School of Visual Arts in New York and a certificate in creative placekeeping from the New Jersey Institute of Technology.

== Career ==
For her work, Gbadebo has used human hair from people of the African diaspora, indigo dye, and soil from a former plantation, True Blue Plantation, in South Carolina where her ancestors were enslaved.

Gbadebo began working with human hair while studying at the School of Visual Arts. Her first solo exhibition was hosted at Rutgers University at the Paul Robeson Gallery while she was still a student. She subsequently began researching her maternal family’s history at the former True Blue Plantation in Fort Motte, South Carolina. In 2020, following her mother's death, she visited the plantation and buried her mother's ashes at the family burial ground, True Blue Cemetery.

Gbadebo later began making ceramic vessels from soil collected at True Blue, using coiling techniques drawn from Nigerian and Cameroonian pottery.

In 2022, two of Gbadebo's ceramic vessels were included in Hear Me Now: The Black Potters of Old Edgefield, South Carolina at the Metropolitan Museum of Art in New York. The exhibition subsequently circulated to the Museum of Fine Arts, Boston, in addition to other museums exhibits. In 2023, she displayed new ceramic works at Maximillian William gallery in London.

Gbadebo received a Pew Fellowship in the Arts in 2022 and a Maxwell/Hanrahan Award in Craft in 2023. Her solo exhibitions include Uprooted at New Jersey City University in 2020 and Remains at Claire Oliver Gallery in New York in 2023.

In 2024, she participated in Ten Thousand Suns, the 24th Biennale of Sydney. In 2025, Nicola Vassell Gallery in New York presented Watch Out for the Ghosts, an exhibition of her ceramic vessels. Gbadebo’s work was included in In Minor Keys, the central exhibition of the 61st Venice Biennale, in 2026.

== Collections ==
Gbadebo's work is held in the collections of the Smithsonian National Museum of African Art, the Smithsonian National Museum of African American History and Culture, the Museum of Fine Arts, Boston, the Brooklyn Museum, the Carnegie Museum of Art, Minnesota Museum of American Art, the Minneapolis Institute of Art, Montclair Art Museum, the Rhode Island School of Design, the South Carolina State Museum, Wake Forest University, the Weisman Art Museum and the Newark Museum of Art. Of select exhibitions, The Smithsonian National Museum of African American History and Culture hosts works from her I Sang the Blues Black series, inspired by her ancestors at the True Blue Plantation.
