= Yo-E Ryou =

South Korean artist (born 1987)

- Born: 1987 (age 38–39); Seoul, South Korea
- Education: Rhode Island School of Design (BFA); Yale School of Art (MFA)
- Known for: Sound art, video, installation art, performance art, drawing
- Notable work: Echoes of the Tides (2025); Breath Orchestra (2026)
- Movement: Contemporary art

Yo-E Ryou (Korean: 류요이; born 1987) is a South Korean contemporary artist, educator, and researcher. Her multidisciplinary practice spans sound, video, installation, performances, and drawing, in which she employs a hydrofeminist lens to explore relationships among the body, memory, ecology, and cultural knowledge. She currently lives on Jeju Island, South Korea.

== Life and career ==
Ryou was born in Seoul, South Korea in 1987. She received a Bachelor of Fine Arts from the Rhode Island School of Design and a Master of Fine Arts from the Yale School of Art. She has undertaken teaching and collaborative projects with institutions in the United States, the United Kingdom, the Netherlands, and South Korea, including the Metropolitan Museum of Art, the Cooper-Hewitt Design Museum, the State University of New York at Purchase College, London College of Arts, Het Nieuwe Instituut, and the Paju Typography Institute.

After several years of living abroad, Ryou moved from New York City to Jeju Island in 2021, prompted by exhaustion she felt during the COVID-19 pandemic. There, she began learning to swim and dive, training at a haenyeo school, alongside the local women divers, who are skilled in gathering seafood without supplemental oxygen. The acts of swimming, diving, breathing, and listening are central to her practice. Her experiences within haenyeo communities became the focus of her artistic research, informing her exploration of underwater perceptions of time and sensation and the transmission of knowledge across generations.

In 2025, Ryou was selected as the sound artist-in-residence at the Musée du quai Branly – Jacques Chirac in Paris. The residency led to Echoes of the Tides, a solo project which draws on haenyeo oral narratives, breathing rhythms that occur during diving, and underwater sound.

Ryou currently lives and works on Jeju Island, where she runs Unlearning Space, an artist-led platform for island-based collaborative research and cultural exchange.

=== 61st Venice Biennale ===
In 2026, Ryou presented Breath Orchestra in In Minor Keys at the 61st Venice Biennale, curated by Koyo Kouoh; she was selected as one of 111 participants in the International Exhibition, rather than exhibiting in the Korean Pavilion. Based on her research with Jeju's haenyeo communities, the work examines breathing rhythms that occur before, during, and after diving.
