= Hagar Ophir =

Hagar Ophir (born 1983) is an artist, performer and costume designer based in Berlin. She was born in Jerusalem and trained as a historian, stage designer and dancer. Ophir was a member of the performance group Public Movement from 2008 to 2019 before beginning to work as an independent artist.

== Career ==
Ophir joined Public Movement in 2008. She participated in the group's performances in Israel and internationally, including Performing Politics for Germany in Berlin in 2009 and Where To? in Holon in 2011. She and Saar Székely led Civil Fast, a 24-hour performance first staged in Jerusalem in 2012. Ophir later represented Public Movement at performances and workshops in Europe, the United States and Australia.

After leaving the group in 2019, Ophir presented Recalling History: Conjuring a Looted Wooden Box from Palestine at the Fundació Antoni Tàpies in Barcelona. The performance used a séance as a method for recounting histories with displaced or looted objects. Ophir also collaborated with Hakim Bishara on It Is Only Through Your Thoughts That I Can Remember Who I Am, first presented at Kunsthall 3.14 in Bergen, Norway.

In 2020, Ophir co-founded mitkollektiv, an intersectional arts education collective, with five other Berlin-based artists and educators. She has also developed workshops at Bard College Berlin.

In 2026, Ophir participated in In Minor Keys, the central exhibition of the 61st Venice Biennale. Her installation Bound with the Living: Gathering in Venice included a stage for séances, a multilingual Ouija board and sound works. The work was made in collaboration with Suleiman, Miriam Schickler, Antonia Eckardt and Hana Umeda.

== Selected works ==
Ophir's works and collaborations include Civil Fast (2012), It Is Only Through Your Thoughts That I Can Remember Who I Am (2017), Recalling History (2019), Bound with the Living: The Archive Room (2024), and Bound with the Living: Gathering in Venice (2026).
