= David Soin Tappeser =

David Soin Tappeser is a German jazz drummer, composer and performance artist based in London and New Delhi. His drumming style focuses on experimentation, improvisation, and using rhythm to manipulate the listeners' perception of time.

== Career ==
His exposure to a range of drum traditions through his extended stays in India, Nepal and Mexico have been deeply influential to his approach to drumming. His style intends to emphasize the aesthetics of sound.

He has repeatedly worked with Himali Singh Soin on experimental audio projects.

== Exhibitions ==
=== 61st Venice Biennale ===
Collaborating alongside Himali Singh Soin, the duo present a site-specific installation that integrates multiple works to form a listening space. The installation includes hanging tapestries and terracotta pieces, while audio featuring spoken words and environmental sounds such as shivering and creaking plays simultaneously. The project draws on research relating recorded connections between the Indian subcontinent and Antarctica, including references to Pangaea.
