= Sandra Knecht =

Swiss artist

Sandra Knect (born 1968) is a Swiss artist. She works across installation, performance, photography, and sculpture. She lives in Buus, a small village in the Basel countryside.

== Life and career ==
Knecht was born in Zurich, Switzerland in 1968. Her practice explores themes of home, identity, belonging, and community, and draws on Alpine folklore and legends, and ritual masks. Her projects question the extent of diversity that society is willing to accept. Collaborative cooking forms a primary component of her artistic practice. Shared meals function as an artistic format, with food and raw ingredients acting as catalysts for exchange and encounter.

She is based in Buus, Switzerland and lives with her partner, dogs, and other farm animals including goats, chickens and a turkey.

=== 61st Venice Biennale ===
Knecht presented her installation Home Is a Foreign Place, made up of sculpture, found objects, and photography, at the 61st Venice Biennale in 2026. It is influenced by the scenographic tradition of Swiss fruit orchards. The work features The Bee House, a restored apiary which was formerly occupied by wasps. She also presented Tschinns, a photographic series that incorporates body performance and self-portraiture, which is inspired by Swiss stories of mountain spirits and links folklore with the artist's reflections on encounters between physical and immaterial worlds.
