= Ashfika Rahman =

Bangladeshi visual artist and educator

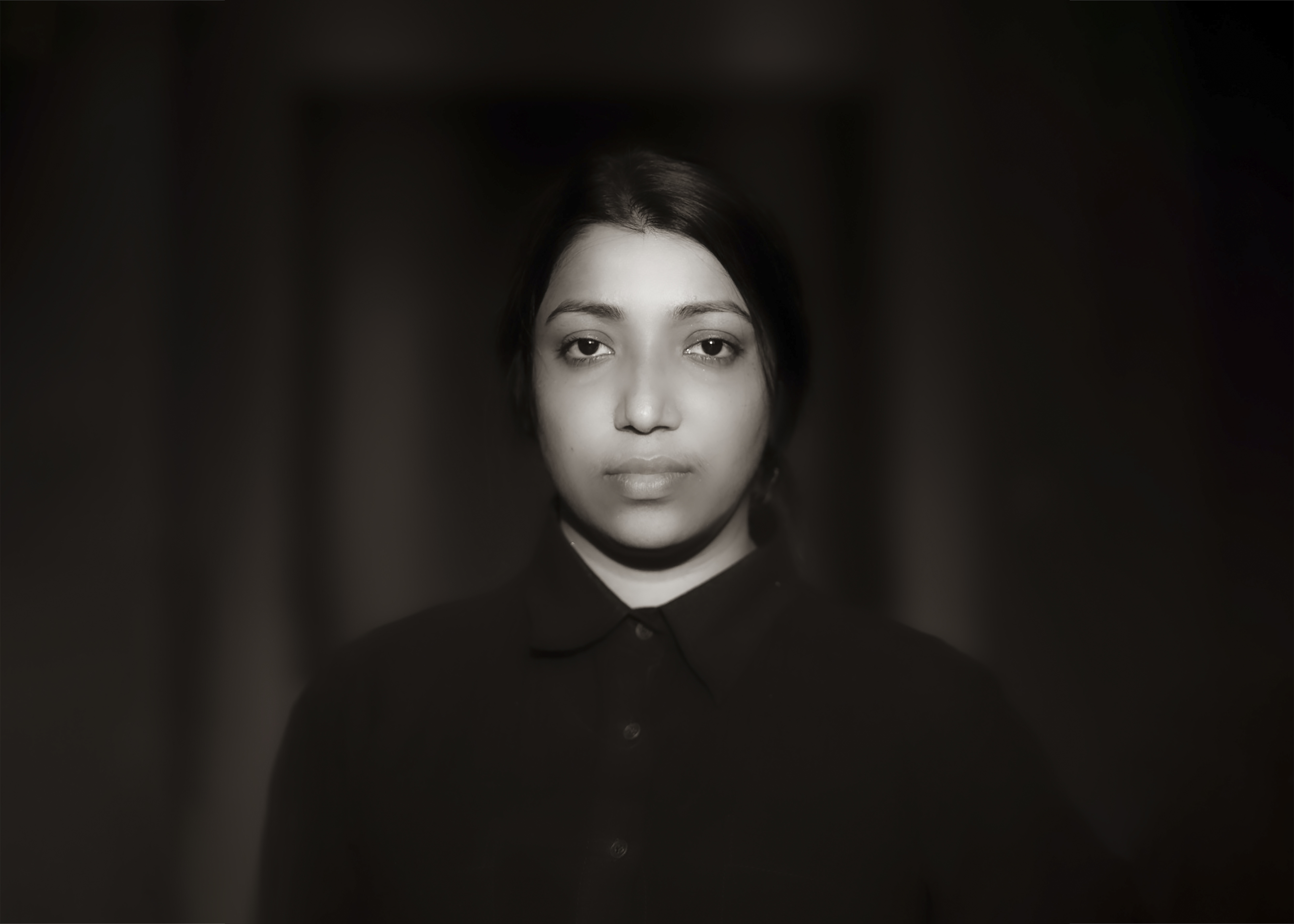
- @Rasel Chowdhury
- Born: 1988 (age 37–38); Bangladesh
- Education: University of Applied Sciences and Arts, Germany
- Occupations: Visual artist & Educator
- Awards: Future Generation Art Prize (2024), Samdani Art Award (2018, 2020, 2023) Finalist.
- Website: www.ashfikarahman.com

Ashfika Rahman (born 1988) is a Bangladeshi visual artist and educator whose multidisciplinary practice encompasses photography, video, textiles, text and installation art. Her work addresses urgent socio-political issues, including gender justice, violence, displacement, climate change and the marginalization of indigenous and minority communities in Bangladesh. Rahman's artistic approach often involves collaboration with the communities she represents, creating alternative visual archives that challenge dominant narratives.

== Early life and education ==
Rahman was born in Bangladesh in 1988. She experienced a childhood shaped by personal loss, having lost both her father and brother at a young age. Raised by her mother, Rashida Begum, a social worker involved in human rights advocacy, Rahman was exposed early to social justice issues. She spent much of her youth moving between cities and living with extended family while her mother worked.

Rahman studied photography at Hochschule Hannover (University of Applied Sciences and Arts) in Germany, graduating in 2017. Prior to that, she earned a Diploma in Professional Photography from Pathshala South Asian Media Institute in Dhaka, Bangladesh, in 2016. She also trained in Indian Classical Dance at the Bangladesh Academy of Fine Arts between 2006 and 2010. She survived blood cancer in 2019.

== Artistic practice ==
Rahman's work is rooted in themes of trauma, resistance, and resilience. She draws inspiration from mythology, folklore, and spiritual practices to contextualize present-day injustices. Through a blend of documentary and conceptual approaches, she highlights stories often absent from mainstream representation, particularly those of indigenous women, ethnic minorities, and disenfranchised communities.

A key focus of Rahman's practice is the use of visual storytelling to document violence against women, religious intolerance, state repression, and ecological crisis. Her projects frequently involve photography, embroidery, text, sculpture, and community engagement.

Rahman is a faculty member at Pathshala South Asian Media Institute in Dhaka, where she teaches photography. She is also a member of MAPS Images Agency based in Brussels.

== Notable works ==
- Behula These Days (বহুলা আজকাল): A collaborative project exploring the lives of women in flood-prone areas in Bangladesh and India, referencing the Bengali myth of Behula. The project uses photography, letters, and embroidery to depict resilience amid displacement and environmental instability.
- Behula and a Thousand Tales (2024): A multidisciplinary project exploring the role of women in South Asian society through photography, text, prints, and sculpture.
- Bon Bibi and Hundred Saga (2020): An installation that addresses religious violence and ecological threat in the Sundarbans, rooted in the folklore of Bon Bibi—a syncretic deity revered by both Hindus and Muslims in the region.
- Files of the Disappeared: An ongoing body of work that addresses political repression and forced disappearances in Bangladesh. The series uses stitched photographs and landscape imagery to memorialize those detained or disappeared by the state.
- Death of a Home (2019): An installation centered on the displacement of ethnic minority communities in Bangladesh, created in dialogue with members of the Santal community.
- Rape is Political (2016–present): A long-term photographic series documenting indigenous women who have experienced sexual violence as a form of political oppression. The project combines portraits with handwritten prayers in indigenous languages.
- Redeem: A large-scale textile work symbolizing religious conversion among Santal and Orao communities, using colored threads to represent religious diversity and coexistence.
- The Power Box: A typological study of televisions in marginalized, off-grid communities in Chalan Beel, Bangladesh. The project explores how state-run media becomes the only source of information and influence in such areas.

== Recognition and awards ==
- Future Generation Art Prize in 2024 by Pinchuk Art Centre
- Sovereign Asian Art Prize (2022), Finalist
- Samdani Art Award (2018, 2020, 2023) Finalist
- Joop Swart Masterclass at World Press Photo in 2018.

== Exhibitions ==
Rahman's work has been presented in several major international exhibitions, including:

- 2024: Busan Biennale (South Korea); Frieze London (UK); Pinchuk Art Centre (Ukraine)
- 2023: Kiran Nadar Museum of Art (India); Dhaka Art Summit (Bangladesh)
- 2022: Triennial of Photography Hamburg (Germany); Palais de Tokyo (France)
- 2019: Chobi Mela Photo Festival (Bangladesh); Palais de Tokyo (France)
