= Ayrson Heráclito =

Brazilian artist

Ayrson Heráclito (born 1968) is a Brazilian artist, curator, and scholar. His art practice is focused on Afro-Brazilian culture and its connections to Africa and the African diaspora in the Americas, particularly in Bahia, and often explores themes of slavery and racism. He lives between Cachoeira and Salvador, Bahia, Brazil.

== Life and career ==
In 1968, Heráclito was born in Macaúbas, Bahia, Brazil. His contemporary art practice is informed by his consecration in the Candomblé Nagô-Ketu tradition, through which he brings its spiritual concepts and symbolic repertoire into contemporary art.

His spiritual practice is rooted in the Jeje-Mahi tradition of the Fon and Ewe peoples, which emphasizes the veneration of ancestors and spirits. He holds the title of Ogã Sojatin of a Jeje Mahi Humpame, a Jeje-Mahi temple in Salvador.

=== 61st Venice Biennale ===
Heráclito presented Juntó at the 2026 Venice Biennale. The series involves 222 drawings in ink and watercolour, as well as stainless steel sculpture, and was created as a homage to Mestre Didi, a high priest in Bahia who was instrumental in establishing Afrocentric perspectives into Brazilian art. The series engages with ritual tools and symbols associated with the Orixás, deities of the Candomblé pantheon.
