= Tammy Nguyen =

Artist

Tammy Nguyen (born 1984) is a multidisciplinary artist whose practice includes painting, printmaking, drawing, and bookmaking. Nguyen was raised in San Francisco, California, and now lives and works in Easton, Connecticut with her husband and family. Alongside her fine arts practice, Nguyen is the founder of the imprint Passenger Pigeon Press, and serves as an assistant professor of art at Wesleyan University.

== Early life and education ==
Nguyen received her BFA from Cooper Union in 2007, before receiving a Fulbright Scholarship to study lacquer painting in Vietnam the following year. She remained in Vietnam for four years, during which she served as an assistant to artists such as Tuan Andrew Nguyen, and later worked for a ceramic tile company.

In 2011, Nguyen returned to the United States to study at Yale University, where she received her MFA in painting and printmaking in 2013. While at Yale, she explored her interests in biology and anthropology, eventually volunteering at the Peabody Museum of Natural History, where she learned taxidermy and helped skin birds for the William Robertson Coe Ornithology Library.

== Work and career ==
Nguyen’s multidisciplinary practice is concerned with archives, geopolitics, lesser-known histories, fiction, myth, and visual narrative. For her paintings, she works in the style of East Asian traditions, using water-based materials on paper. She incorporates mediums such as watercolor, Flashe, ink, pastel, gilding, and hot stamping into her layering process.

2022 marked a landmark year for Nguyen. Her work was featured in the twelfth installment of the Berlin Biennale for Contemporary Art, curated by Algerian-French artist Kader Attia. Lehmann Maupin gallery announced their representation of Nguyen that same year.

Her debut presentation with Lehmann Maupin was a three-part exhibition series exploring Nguyen’s reading of Dante Alighieri's Divine Comedy, titled A Comedy for Mortals. The first exhibition, Inferno, was presented at the gallery’s Seoul location, while the second, Purgatorio, was held in London. The final installment of the series, Paradiso, was exhibited at Lehmann Maupin’s New York gallery. Inferno and Purgatorio served as Nguyen’s solo debut in Korea and the United Kingdom, respectively.

Nguyen’s first solo museum exhibition in the United States was presented at the Institute of Contemporary Art Boston in 2023. The eponymous exhibition centers around the artist’s investigations into American essayist Ralph Waldo Emerson, whose writings on transcendentalism and nature are juxtaposed with Vietnamese history. Her work has been exhibited in many university museums and libraries since, including the Sarasota Art Museum of Ringling College of Art and Design in 2024, and the University Museum of Contemporary Art at University of Massachusetts Amherst in 2025. An exhibition of her artist book series, A Comedy for Mortals, was held by her alma mater at the Cooper Union Library.

Passenger Pigeon Press currently operates out of Nguyen’s studio. Alongside producing collaborations with artists and thinkers, the independent press publishes artist books and distributes them through the subscription service Martha’s Quarterly, named after Martha, the last known passenger pigeon who died in 1914.

== Awards and recognition ==
In 2023, Nguyen was named as a Guggenheim Fellow. Other honors and distinctions include the Herb Alpert/Ucross Residency Prize in Visual Arts in 2024; the NYSCA/NYFA Artist Fellowship in Painting in 2021, awarded by the New York State Council on the Arts (NYSCA) and the New York Foundation for the Arts (NYFA); and the Scholarship for Advanced Studies in Book Arts from The Center for Book Arts in 2024. Additionally, Nguyen served as a Pacific Delegate for the Carnegie Council for Ethics and International Affairs’s Asia Dialogues program in 2017.

== Collections ==
Nguyen’s work is included in the permanent collections of:

- Institute of Contemporary Art Boston, Boston, MA
- Museum of Fine Arts, Boston, MA
- Whitney Museum of American Art Library, New York, NY
- Thomas J. Watson Library, Metropolitan Museum of Art, New York, NY
- Asia Art Archive, Hong Kong and New York, NY
