= Raed Yassin =

- Born: 1979 (age 46–47)

Raed Yassin (born 1979) is a Lebanese artist and musician. Yassin’s body of work explores personal and collective histories, often addressed using consumer culture and mass production as a conceptual framework. He currently lives and works between Beirut and Berlin.

== Education and career ==
In 2003, Yassin graduated from the theater department at the Institute of Fine Arts in Beirut, and since then developed his multidisciplinary practice across multiple mediums, including video, sound, photography, text, sculpture and performance. His father was a fashion designer in Saudi Arabia.

Yassin's artistic practice explores the intersections of fact, fiction, history, and identity. His work draws inspiration from non-institutional archives of Egyptian cinema, Lebanese radio, and pan-Arab popular culture. He also repurposes materials from popular culture and everyday life to examine memory, family history, and the legacies of conflict and colonialism.

He was an artist-in-residence at De Ateliers, Amsterdam (2008-2010), the Delfina Foundation, London (2010 and 2014), and Akademie der Künste der Welt, Cologne (2015). As a musician, he has released several solo albums, and in 2006, Yassin formed the band Praed with Paed Conca. Yassin played keyboards, electronics and vocals, while Conca played clarinet, electric bass and electronics. The group's music combines elements of Arabic popular music, free jazz, and electronic music. In 2009, he founded the independent music label Annihaya.

He is a founding member of the Beirut-based art collective Atfal Ahdath and an organizer of the Irtijal Festival for Experimental Music.

== Career ==
Yassin was featured in the Sharjah Biennial in 2009 and 2011.His installation The Best of Sammy Clark (2008), presented at the Delfina Foundation in London in 2011, combined records, altered family photographs and a fictional account of the Lebanese singer Sami Clark.

Yassin received the Abraaj Group Art Prize in 2012 for China, a series of seven porcelain vases depicting battles from the Lebanese Civil War. He interviewed people who had fought in the war and used their accounts to prepare images that were painted onto porcelain in Jingdezhen, China. He continued working with porcelain in the series Yassin Dynasty (2013).

In 2014, Yassin received a Production Programme grant from the Sharjah Art Foundation. He was awarded a research fellowship at the Akademie der Künste der Welt in Cologne the following year.

At the 61st Venice Biennale, Yassin exhibited Warhol of Arabia (2016-2018), a work that uses archival evidence of Andy Warhol’s 1977 visit to Kuwait to explore themes of memory, identity, and cultural history through fictional reconstruction. He also presents Yassin Haute Couture (2018), a project commemorating his late father who was killed during the Lebanese Civil War.

== Awards ==
Yassin received the Abraaj Group Art Prize in 2012.
