= Kąrî'kạchä Seid'ou =

Ghanaian academic and artist

Kąrî'kạchä Seid'ou, formerly known as Kelvin Amankwaah, is a Ghanaian academic and artist.

== Career ==
He worked at the Kwame Nkrumah University of Science and Technology (KNUST) as an art director. He was a lecturer at the KNUST Fine Art Department.
