= Eustaquio Neves =

Brazilian photographer (born 1955)

Eustáquio Neves (born 1955) is a Brazilian photographer and visual artist. A self-taught photographer, he is known for altering negatives and photographic prints, layering images and incorporating text into his photos. His series include Arturos (1993–1995), Boa Aparência (2000), Máscara de Punição (2003–2004), and Cartas ao Mar (2016).

== Early life and education ==
Neves was born in Juatuba, Minas Gerais, Brazil, in 1955. He studied classical guitar and trained as a chemist before becoming a photographer. He studied chemistry from the Escola Politécnica de Minas Gerais, graduating in 1989.

Neves worked as an industrial chemistry technician after moving to Niquelândia, Goiás. He began experimenting with photography during the 1980s and later left chemistry to work as a photographer.

== Career ==
Neves began developing his photographs in his own laboratory in Belo Horizonte in 1987. His early series Caos Urbano dates from 1992. In Arturos, made between 1993 and 1995, he photographed a Black community in Contagem, Minas Gerais, whose members trace their history to Artur Camilo Silvério, the son of formerly enslaved people. He displayed Arturos later at the 2026 Venice Biennale.

He received the Marc Ferrez Photography Award from Funarte in 1994. In 1996, his work was included in Novas Travessias: New Directions in Brazilian Photography at The Photographers' Gallery in London.

In Boa Aparência (2000), Neves combined a self-portrait with historical advertisements concerning enslaved people and contemporary employment advertisements that used the expression boa aparência (“good appearance”). His series Máscara de Punição (2003–2004) was created in reference to masks used as punishment against enslaved people in Brazil.

In 2019, Neves received the ZUM Photography Grant from the Instituto Moreira Salles for Retrato falado. For the project, he constructed an image of his grandfather, of whom his family had no photographs, using descriptions given by relatives and analog and digital photographic techniques. His work was included in the 35th São Paulo Biennial in 2023.

== Collections ==
Neves's work is held in the collections of the Museu Afro Brasil, Museu de Arte Moderna de São Paulo, Itaú Cultural and the Pirelli/MASP photography collection. The Instituto Moreira Salles also holds work by Neves in its contemporary photography collection.
