= RAW Material Company =

Arts center in Dakar, Senegal

RAW Material Company is an arts center in Dakar, Senegal. Its founder is curator Koyo Kouoh, who launched it in 2008. It became an established physical space in 2011. The organization serves as a platform for critical reflection on artistic practice and its relationship to contemporary society.

Its transdisciplinary programming incorporates various creative fields such as literature, film, architecture, politics, fashion, and cuisine. Its activities include involvement in curatorial projects, exhibitions, knowledge production, events such as symposia, and artist residencies through RAW Académie, an experimental educational program. The organization aims to support the development of conceptual and artistic creativity within Africa and its diaspora.
