= Mohammed Joha =

Mohammed Joha (born 1978) is a Palestinian artist. Joha's work is informed by his upbringing living in Gaza. He currently lives and works between Marseille and Paris.

== Life and career ==
Joha was born in Gaza, Palestine in 1978. He received training at Al-Aqsa University in Gaza City and earned a bachelor's degree in art education in 2003. Though he left Gaza in 2004, Joha maintains a strong connection to it through his art, drawing on his firsthand experience as a Palestinian who has endured numerous conflicts in Gaza.

He studied at the Darat Al Funun summer academy in Amman, Jordan, where he was mentored by Syrian-German artist Marwan Kassab-Bachi.

Joha completed an artist residency at the Cité internationale des Arts, Paris.

=== 61st Venice Biennale ===
By invitation, Joha participated in the 61st Venice Biennale. In his artwork, his technique of layering discarded paper, cardboard, and fabric onto canvas reflects how commonplace it is for Gazans’ to engage in rebuilding and repurposing while enduring repeated destruction. In No Shelter, he captures this sentiment through watercolor paintings of Gaza's landscape, created while witnessing Gaza's destruction from a screen.

== Awards ==
In 2004, for his project Clothesline, Joha was awarded the Young Artist of the Year Award, which was organized by the A.M. Qattan Foundation. The artworks from Clothesline have since been destroyed during the war in Gaza. Named as a joint recipient, he also received the inaugural Nicholas Fox Weber Prize from the Josef and Anni Albers Foundation.
