= Sabian Baumann =

Swiss artist

Sabian Baumann (born 1962) is a Swiss multidisciplinary artist and activist. Baumann’s art practice encompasses sculpture, film, installation, drawing and collaborative art. They frequently take part in transdisciplinary art and film projects that are approached through a queer, feminist and intersectional lens. They currently live in Zurich, Switzerland.

== Life and career ==
In 1962, Baumann was born in Zug, Switzerland. They are trained in teaching art, and have taught at universities .

=== Exhibitions ===
Baumann has exhibited in Switzerland and internationally. In 2026 Baumann participated in the 61st Venice Biennale, presenting drawings from nature (presque) mort that feature imagery aesthetically associated with scientific illustration and children’s fiction. Two of the drawings shown in Venice, Raupen (Caterpillars, 2024) and Kuss (Kiss, 2024), belong to the Julius Baer Art Collection. Their sculptural works included Horizontales Paradies (2013–2014), a series of reliefs made from unfired clay, portraying humanoid figures engaging in intimate acts and gestures.

=== Awards ===
In 2012, Baumann received the Erna and Curt Burgauer Grant.
