= Thania Petersen =

South African visual artist (born 1980)

- Born: 1980 (age 45–46); Cape Town, South Africa
- Education: Central Saint Martin College of Art, London (2001-2003)
- Known for: photography, performance, installation

Thania Petersen is a multi-disciplinary artist. Her work is in the collections of notable museums and galleries including the Smithsonian's National Museum of African Art and the Zeitz Museum of Contemporary Art Africa.

== Biography ==
In her art, she uses photography, performance and installation to address themes of Islamophobia, imperialism and colonialism.

Petersen lives and works in Cape Town, South Africa.

== Public collections ==
- Pérez Art Museum Miami
- Nationaal Museum van Wereldculturen, Rotterdam
- National Museum of African Art, Smithsonian Institution, Washington D.C.
- Oscar Niemeyer Museum, Curitiba
- Durban Art Gallery
- Iziko South African National Gallery
- Zeitz Museum of Contemporary Art Africa
