= Amina Saoudi Aït Khay =

- Born: 1955 (age 70–71); Casablanca, Morocco

Amina Saoudi Aït Khay (born 1955) is a Moroccan textile artist based in Tunis, Tunisia. She makes hand-woven wool pastries using natural dyes and silk paintings. Her work was included in the Diriyah Contemporary Art Biennale and the Venice Biennale in 2026.

== Early life ==
Saoudi Aït Khay was born in 1955 in Casablanca, Morocco. Her mother was a weaver, and Saoudi Aït Khay learned to assist at her loom as a child. She later worked as a physics and chemistry teacher in Casablanca.

Saoudi Aït Khay began making art in 1994, where she briefly attended a silk-painting course, learning the serti technique of outlining designs with resist before applying dye. She left the course after its instructor objected to her decision to work without copying the prescribed design. She soon began producing her own silk paintings.

== Career ==
Saoudi Aït Khay later transitioned from silk painting to wool weaving, using improvisation to develop abstract forms. She dyes her yarn with natural pigments sourced near her home. Her tapestries draw on imagery of Moroccan and Tunisian landscapes, Amazigh weaving traditions, and the influence of her mother, a carpet weaver and political activist.

Her works from the 2000s and 2010s include Sufetula (2004), Kelim Ondoyant (2009), Gafsa (2009–2010), Tiznit (2011), Ouarzazate (2012) and Narration II (2017). In 2013, the Tunisian state acquired one of her tapestries (7). Her first solo exhibition, created as a tribute to Paul Klee, took place in Tunisia in 2014.

Her work has also been exhibited at the Diriyah Biennale in Saudi Arabia (2026), the Venice Biennale (2026), the Barjeel Art Foundation and Sharjah Art Foundation, both in the United Arab Emirates, and the Kamel Lazaar Foundation in Tunisia. Her works presented at the 61st Venice Biennale (2026) comprises colorful, patterned woven artworks created on a tall loom, that use colors sourced from fruits and flowers, including turmeric, pomegranate, tea, and beetroot.

Saoudi Aït Khay's work is held in several international collections, including the Guggenheim Abu Dhabi, Fondation H in Antananarivo, Madagascar, the Barjeel Foundation in Sharjah, United Arab Emirates, Modern and Contemporary Museum of Tunisia and the Kamel Lazaar Foundation, which are both located in Tunis.

== Selected works ==
- Sufetula (2004), wool weaving
- Kelim Ondoyant (2009), wool weaving and natural dyes
- Gafsa (2009–2010), wool weaving
- Tiznit (2011), wool weaving and natural dyes
- Ouarzazate (2012), wool weaving
- Narration II (2017), wool weaving
- Kebissa (2023), wool weaving and natural dyes
