= Florence Lazar =

Florence Lazar (born 1966) is a French visual artist, filmmaker, and photographer who works across the disciplines of documentary film, video, and photography. Her work explores interstitial history, geographical memory, and minority narratives. Her films have dealt with the former Yugoslavia, the Paris suburbs of Montfermeil, and Martinique.

== Early life and education ==
Lazar was born in Paris in 1966. She is of Serbian and Polish-Hungarian Jewish descent. Lazar has stated that her family connections led her to follow the Yugoslav Wars more closely.

During the 1990s, Lazar worked predominantly in photographic portraiture. She then began incorporating video into her practice toward the end of the decade.

== Career ==
Lazar's Les Paysans (2000) was the first in a series of documentary works about the Yugoslav conflicts. Other works dealt with the fall of Slobodan Milosevic, the war crimes court in Belgrade, and the rewriting of history in Republika Srpska. Her film Kamen - Les Pierres (2014), set in Bosnia and Herzegovina, documents the reconstruction of buildings after the Bosnian War. It was displayed in the French competition of the Cinéma du Réel festival in 2014.

In 2019, the Jeu de Paume in Paris selected Tu crois que la terre est chose morte..., a solo exhibition of Lazar's films and photographs from 2000 onward. The exhibition included125 hectares (2019), created in Martinique about a group of farmers and agricultural organization at Morne-Rouge.

Lazar also directed the feature-length documentary Tu crois que la terre est chose morte (2019), which was produced by Arte France and concentrates on chlordecone pollution in Martinique. The film was selected for the International Documentary Film Festival Amsterdam in 2019 and Cinéma du Réel in 2020.

== Selected works ==
Lazar's works include Les Paysans (2000), Les Femmes en noir (2002), Étoile Rouge (2006), Confessions d'un jeune militant (2008), Kamen - Les Pierres (2014), 125 hectares (2019), and Tu crois que la terre est chose morte (2019).
