= Celia Vásquez Yui =

- Born: 1960 (age 65–66); Pucallpa, Peru

Celia Vásquez Yui (born 1960) is a Peruvian artist and Indigenous rights activist. She serves as political representative of the Shipibo-Conibo people of Peru. Her ceramic work employs traditional Shipibo-Conibo methods; specifically coil-built, mazelike patterns that were handed down from grandmother to mother to daughter. Her work is held in several institutional collections such as The Art Institute of Chicago and The Ruth and Elmer Wellin Museum of Art at Hamilton College.

== Biography ==
Vásquez Yui was born in the Amazonian city of Pucallpa in Ucayali, Peru in 1960. Vásquez Yui began her practice under the tutelage of her mother, who was a ceramicist and descends from a lineage of Polychrome Horizon cultures, which has an archaeological record in the Amazon region dating back several millennia.

She was elected as the President of the Professional Association of Sculptors of the Ucayali region of Peru in 2007.

== Exhibitions ==
Vásquez Yui’s solo exhibition, The Council of the Mother Spirit of the Animals, travelled from Salon 94 in New York City to Cornell University’s Herbert F. Johnson Museum of Art in Ithaca, New York between 2023 and 2024. The exhibition received critical acclaim with The New Yorker naming it as a top exhibition of the year. In 2025 through 2026, she exhibited Indigenous Futurism at Mindy Solomon Gallery in Miami, Florida. The exhibition was organized in collaboration with The Shipibo Conibo Center in Harlem, New York.

=== 61st Venice Biennale ===
At the 61st Venice Biennale in 2026, Vásquez Yui presented The Council of the Mother Spirits of the Animals, an installation of zoomorphic ceramic sculptures that incorporate Shipibo tradition and mythology.

The way in which the sculptures are arranged evoke a ritual or parliamentary gathering as a means of addressing interspecies dialogue, as well as a way to emphasize the rights of nature. Vásquez Yui describes her practice as a form of shamanism focused on the health of humans as collective and the environment, rather than individual healing. The works utilize materials sourced from various locations along the Ucayali River to map ancestral territories central to Shipibo-Conibo claims for sovereignty.
