= Kennedy Yanko =

American sculptor, painter, and installation artist

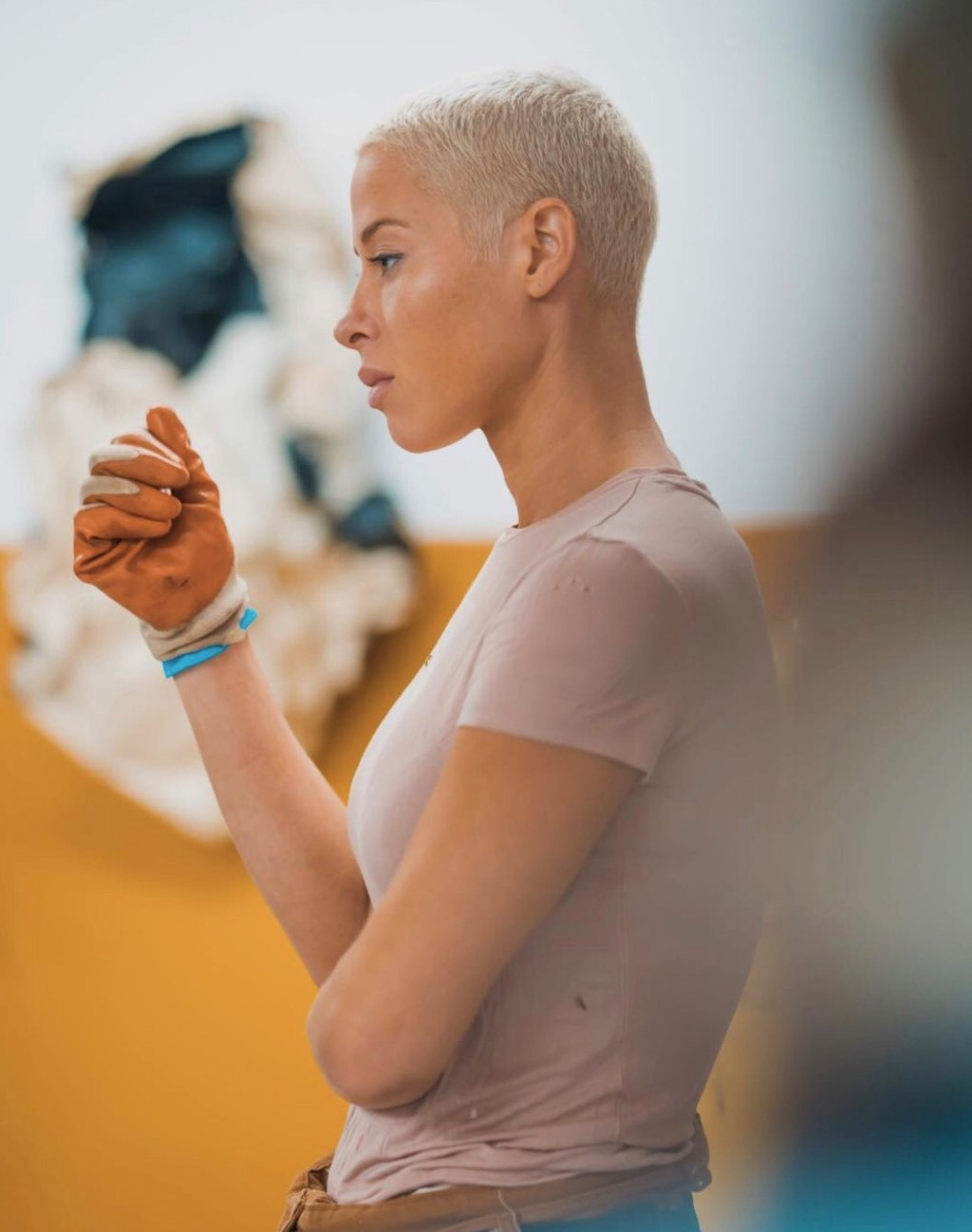
- Born: 1988 (age 37–38); Saint Louis, Missouri, US
- Occupations: Painter, sculptor, installation artist

Kennedy Yanko (born October 21, 1988) is an American sculptor, painter, and installation artist known for working with "paint skins" and found metal. Yanko sources discarded objects and other material from salvage yards and manipulates or modifies their form, shape, or structure into her vision. Her abstract work draws upon surrealism, abstract expressionism, and physical austerities, as well as her background in performance art.

Kennedy Yanko was born and raised in St. Louis, Missoury, USA.

== Work ==
To create "paint skins", Yanko pours large amounts of paint and lets it dry into a tarp-like material. From there, she sculpts the paint skin, using her whole body to manipulate the heavy sheet of paint. The paint skin thus becomes a structural material not dissimilar from the metal she utilizes in her sculptures. At times, the two materials are indistinguishable.

In 2023, she presented the solo exhibition Kennedy Yanko: Tilted Lift at the Museum of Contemporary Art Detroit, as part of this institution's Mike Kelley Mobile Homestead lawn program. In 2024, the Pérez Art Museum Miami, acquired her wild wild country (2023) as part of its PAMM Fund for Black Art.

In 2025 Yanko had exhibitions at Salon 94 gallery (Kennedy Yanko: Retro Future) and James Cohan gallery (Kennedy Yanko: Epithets). Yanko, stated that Epithets was, "about looking at the layers, the things beneath the veil. It was about exploring the parts of ourselves that we struggle to share with the world, the things we have trouble accepting." She continues, "I wanted to create a visual language that reflects the ooziness, the scariness, and the raw, sometimes ugly, experience of stepping into that space—of moving through it and existing within it."

=== Public art ===
In 2019, Yanko installed her first public sculpture, titled 3 WAYS, as part of the Poydras Corridor Sculpture Exhibition, funded by the Helis Foundation, in New Orleans.

== Residencies ==
- 2021 Artist in Residence, Rubell Museum in Miami
- 2017 Fountainhead Residency, Miami

== Public collections ==
- Brooklyn Abstraction: Four Artists, Four Walls (2022-2025), The Brooklyn Museum, New York
- wild wild country (2023), Pérez Art Museum Miami, Florida
- The Smithsonian National Museum of African American History & Culture, Washington, D.C.
- Rubell Museum, Miami
- Espacio Tacuarí, Buenos Aires, Argentina
- The Bunker Artspace, West Palm Beach, Florida
