= Alexa Kumiko Hatanaka =

Canadian artist (born 1988)

Alexa Kumiko Hatanaka (born 1988) is a Japanese-Canadian artist. She uses traditional East Asian papermaking and printmaking techniques in a primarily paper-based practice that reflects on themes of climate change, mental health, and survival.

== Life and career ==
Hatanaka was born in Toronto, Ontario, Canada in 1988. She studied printmaking at OCAD University in Toronto before learning traditional woodblock printmaking in China in 2011. Her research has since focused on the history of paper as well as efforts to revive papermaking traditions. Her practice is shaped by her queer identity and experience living with bipolar disorder.

Her predominantly paper-based practice incorporates traditional paper techniques and materials, combining approaches such as printmaking, ink drawing, natural dyeing, and sewing by hand to produce large-scale installations and wearable sculptures. Deliberately honouring the Japanese concept of mottainai in her work, she repurposes sewing offcuts in her patchwork paper textiles, reuses old printing blocks, and incorporates paper rice bags and vintage washi, some of which are over 50 years old. She uses konnyaku starch to treat her paper to make her textiles both flexible and durable. She also integrates kamiko in her work. Her work frequently depicts landscapes, bodies of water, and fish, particularly those found in ancient mythology.

She has also undertaken artist residencies, including twelve weeks at Black Rock in Dakar, Senegal in 2025 and four weeks at Arts Maebashi in Japan in 2026.

=== 61st Venice Biennale ===
Hatanaka was invited to participate at the 61st Venice Biennale in 2026. She presented Namazu (2023), a work that draws on the Japanese legend of a catfish whose movements cause earthquakes to occur; Faultlines and Loneliness (2024) and Instability (2024); and Susceptibility to Gravity (2026), exhibited in the Giardini, which draws inspiration from koinobori. The High Arctic features prominently in her work, informed by her involvement in community-based projects in that ecoregion for more than a decade. Moveable and Immoveable reflects on her time in the High Arctic, featuring linocuts depicting snowdrifts that have helped the Inuit peoples navigate their terrain for centuries.

== Awards ==
In 2026, Hatanaka received the Sobey Art Award from the National Gallery of Canada. She has also been awarded several grants from the Canada Council for the Arts.
