= Victoria-Idongesit Udondian =

Nigerian artist (born 1982)

- Born: 1982 (age 43–44); Akwa Ibom State, Nigeria
- Education: University of Uyo (BA); Columbia University (MFA); Skowhegan School of Painting and Sculpture
- Awards: MacDowell Fellowship (2019); Guggenheim Fellowship (2020)

Victoria-Idongesit Udondian (born 1982), also known as Victoria Udondian, is a Nigerian artist. Specializing in textile work, installations, and performance art, her work often involves themes of Black history, labour, and the global trade of secondhand clothing. She is a 2019 MacDowell Fellow and a 2020 Guggenheim Fellow.

== Biography ==
Victoria-Idongesit Udondian was born in 1982 in Akwa Ibom State. After training as a fashion designer and tailor, she obtained a BA in Painting from the University of Uyo in 2004. Udondian recalled that during her time at Uyo, she once had to take a night bus "about 450 miles to Lagos" to get enough oil paint for her university course. She cites Ghanaian sculptor El Anatsui as an influence in her work.

In 2010, Udondian travelled throughout Africa to resource the continent's cultural and economic relationship with the global trade of secondhand clothing. Her textile work Aso Ikele (1948) was part of the 2012 Manchester art show We Face Forward: Art from West Africa Today; AfricanaH said that it "takes the Whitworth's textile collection as its starting point", while Bob Dickinson of Art Monthly remarked that it draws from the way "trade underlines the history of West Africa's relationship with Manchester from slave-trade days to the industrial revolution", as well as the 1945 Pan-African Congress. She appeared at the 56th Venice Biennale in 2015. In 2016, she obtained an MFA in Sculpture and New Genres from Columbia University and attended the Skowhegan School of Painting and Sculpture. In 2017, she started her project The Republic of Unknown Territory while becoming a naturalized American citizen.

Udondian was a MacDowell Fellow in 2019. In 2020, she was awarded a Guggenheim Fellowship in Fine Arts. In 2022, she held her first New York City solo exhibition at Smack Mellon, How Can I Be Nobody, an installation which uses black-colored fabric "in acknowledgement of the black and brown lives lost in search of better conditions". She met several Brooklyn immigrant communities as part of her research for How Can I Be Nobody. In collaboration with dancer Raven McRae and choreographer Danion Lewis, she started the performance installation Nsi nam mi ke ndi that same year.

Udondian's work appeared at the 2023 British Textile Biennial. She won a 2024 Anonymous Was a Woman Environmental Art Grant for her work Okrika Reclaimed. A collaboration with the Foundation for Contemporary Art, Okrika Reclaimed appeared at Kantamanto on 12 July 2025. Udondian remarked that some of her work, including Okrika Reclaimed, is designed to question the trend of secondhand clothing by addressing Africa's growing problem with textile waste. She will appear at the 61st Venice Biennale.

Ayanna Dozier remarked that themes of Udondian's artwork often involve "unseen" forms of labour and stereotypically feminine work, including domestic work, the service industry, and the textile industry. Additionally, Udondian focuses on the relationship between clothing and identity as a theme.

As of 2022, Udondian was based in Lagos and Brooklyn. She is also a visiting associate professor at the Center for the Arts, University at Buffalo, and she served as interim director of graduate studies during their fall 2025 semester.
