= Daniel Lie =

Dan Lie
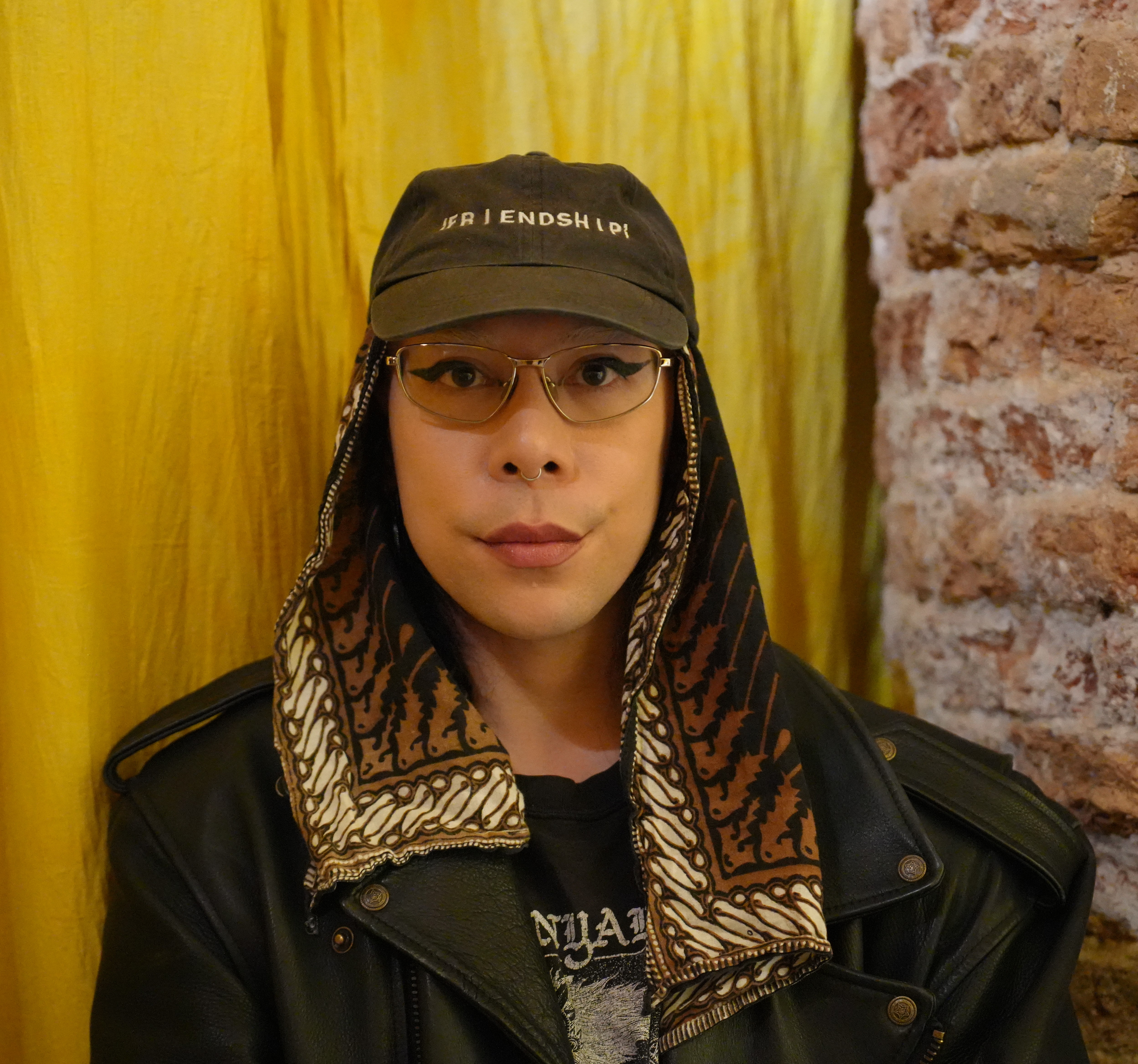
- Dan Lie at the 2026 Venice Biennale
- Born: 1988 (age 37–38)
- Education: BA in Fine Arts at São Paulo State University
- Website: studiodanlie.com

Dan Lie (they/them) is a trans-nonbinary Berlin-based artist known for their site and time specific environmental sculptures. They exhibited as part of the 2026 Venice Biennale.

== Career ==
Lie draws from their diasporic heritage and queer identity to create installations that are as much living environments as they are contemplative spaces. Since Lie uses organic materials, decay and decomposition becomes part of the installation and makes it difficult to collect.

== Personal life ==
Lie’s mother is from Garanhuns in Pernambuco state of Brazil and their father is from Semarang, in Java Island of Indonesia. Lie uses they/them pronouns.

Lie has exhibited their organic work in England, Hungary, Indonesia, Germany, Brazil, Chile, in Austria in the 2017 Vienna Festwochen, and Italy as part of the 2026 Venice Biennale.
