= Bangkok Biennial =

Exhibition of contemporary art

The Bangkok Biennial was a biennial exhibition of contemporary art inaugurated in 2018. The first edition ran from July 1 until September 30. It was the first biennial/biennale event to take place in Thailand. Organised in a decentralised and open-access manner, the 2018 Bangkok Biennial did not have a central curatorial team and was made up of autonomous, self-organised pavilions. Most of the pavilions were located in the city of Bangkok, additional pavilion were located in other parts of Thailand and in the Netherlands and Japan online.

Preceding the Thailand Biennale and the Bangkok Art Biennale, the Bangkok Biennial is one of three very different biennial art events all inaugurated in Thailand in the second half of 2018.

The founders of the Bangkok Biennial have remained anonymous to date. They have claimed this is in an effort to work against traditional 'top-down' approaches.

The event's second (and final) edition was held in 2020.

== Artist in 2018 edition ==
An unknown number of artists were included in the first edition of the Bangkok Biennial. Originally billed as "150+" artists, the event's website, published materials and mobile application listed 249 artists when the event opened in July 2018. The actual number is likely higher.
