= Himali Singh Soin =

Indian writer and artist

Himali Singh Soin is an Indian writer and artist currently who works between New Delhi and London. Singh Soin's interdisciplinary work focuses on the nature of identity, environmental issues, and the notion of deep time. She works across film, spoken word, performance, epistolary poetry, animation, music, and embroidery, which allows her to interweave complex concepts and narratives together. Singh Soin has performed and exhibited at the Serpentine Galleries, Dhaka Art Summit, Somerset House, Devi Art Foundation, and Performa, and won the India Foundation for the Arts Award, and the Frieze Artist Award.

== Early life and education ==
Himali Singh Soin was born in 1987. Although she is from North central India and spent her youth in Delhi, she attended school in London and eventually went on to receive a BA in Theatre and English from Middlebury College, a MA in English Literature from The Bread Loaf School Of English and an MFA from Goldsmiths, University of London. Her work is heavily influenced by her Indian identity as she grapples with a feeling of alienation, nativism, nationality, and colonialism as a result of her upbringing in western culture. Her practice also draws heavily from her many travels. Growing up her father was an explorer who ventured as far as the arctic. Her parents would go on to make a travel company resulting in an annual family expedition which allowed Singh Soin to acquire inspiration and materials for her work.

== Art ==
Himali Singh Soin focuses on the themes of ecological loss, the loss of home, the search for shelter, issues of identity, and the nature of time. She uses metaphors from outer space and the natural environment in order to create fictional cosmologies that reflect upon the relationship between human and non-human life. The artist works in a range of media including performance, moving image, writing, sound, and text-based work.

We are Opposite Like That II: In 2019, Frieze commissioned Himali to create an artwork inspired by her journey to the Arctic Circle that reinvents traditional stories of exploration. She created a film titled We are Opposite Like That II, that gives a feminist take on typical male explorer narratives and colonial ideas through a fantastical and imaginative lens. The film also reflects on the idea of ice as an archive of stories that risk being lost due to glacial melt. In the film, Singh Soin plays the role of a tropical creature which transforms into ice and awakens the permafrost to become a living entity.

Ancestors of the Blue Moon: When Himali joined the Whitechapel Gallery Writer in Residence Program in 2020, she created a series of texts titled The Ancestors of the Blue Moon that researched her ancestral roots. The "flash fictions" collection discusses concepts like her namesake, the Himalayas, animistic rituals or remedies, mystical geometries, old-new materialism, and spirit realism. The texts are written from the perspective of forgotten deities who are recounting the world that they witness, and refer to the Tibetan Buddhist conception of the astral planes of existence as well as the rare blue moon that transforms linear time into mythical time.
