= Yoshiko Shimada =

Japanese mixed-media artist (born 1959)

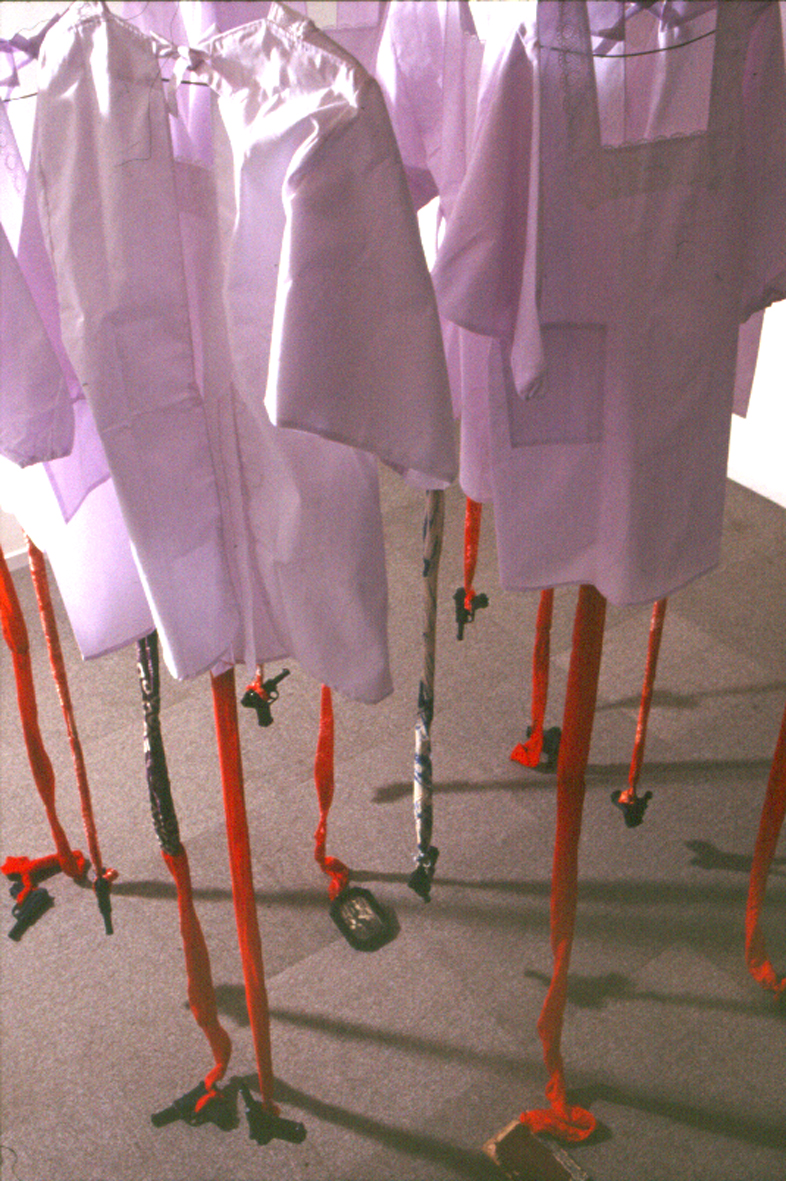
- Tied to Apron Strings
- Born: 1959 (age 66–67); Tachikawa, Japan
- Education: Scripps College, Bigakkō, Kingston University
- Notable work: Shooting Lesson (1992), A Picture to be Burnt (1993), Tied to Apron Strings (1993), Comfort/Women/of Conformity (1994-5), Bones in Tansu: Family Secrets (2004), Becoming a Statue of a Japanese Comfort Woman (2012-Present)

Yoshiko Shimada (嶋田 美子, Shimada Yoshiko; b. 1959) is a Japanese printmaker and performance artist who has been referred to as "Japan’s premier feminist and antiwar artist."

Shimada has been exploring issues of gender, power, history, and nation in her artwork since the late 1980s, situating her artwork within her own complex socio-political context of being Asian, Japanese, and a woman. Her works have been exhibited expansively, both within Japan and internationally. Shimada has curated art exhibitions in Japan and abroad, and she lectures on Japanese art, politics, and feminism at the University of Tokyo.

== Biography ==
Shimada was born and raised in Tachikawa, western Tokyo, near the U.S. Air Force Base where her father worked during the height of the US's military involvement in Southeast Asia. Growing up near the base, which was formerly used by the Japanese Imperial Army, exposed Shimada to US-Japan postwar tensions from a young age during the tumultuous 1960s.

Shimada attended university in the U.S., graduating in 1982 with a BA in Fine Art from Scripps College in Claremont, California, before returning to Japan to study etching under Mono-ha artist Yoshida Katsurō at the alternative art school Biggakō in Tokyo. Shimada also spent time living in Berlin and New York City and is comfortable with both the German and English language, which has aided her in building a transnational platform for her body of work. In 2015, she received her PhD from Kingston University, London.

== Career ==
Shimada’s oeuvre engages with the way that wartime history has been preserved and perpetuated in attitudes and cultural memory in present-day Japanese society, with particular interest in the role of women in World War II as both aggressors and victims. She claims that her aim is not simply to point fingers at the accused, but rather to explore how structures of imperialism are implicated in both the past and present. In the artist’s own words, “there is no clear borderline between the oppressors and the oppressed anymore.”

Shimada's works are held by the New York Public Library, Tokyo Photographic Art Museum, Keio University Art Center, Kyoto Seika University, and City University of New York. Shimada participated in the MoMA PS1 Studio Program in 1998-1999. Her work is included in the Asian American Arts Centre's professional digital archive of Asian and Asian American contemporary visual artists.

=== 'Past Imperfect' Series (early 1990s) ===
Shimada moved to Berlin after graduating from university in the U.S., where she observed artists engaging with issues of German war responsibility after World War II. She began to explore the representation of war history and memory within her own artwork following the death of the Showa Emperor in 1989, when she was troubled by nostalgic portrayals of Japan’s wartime history. She was angered by what she viewed as a failure of the Japanese press and media to reflect on anything other than a romantic version of the past. Shimada began to explicitly deal with the issue of ‘comfort women’ in the early 1990s, after three Korean women who had filed lawsuits again the Japanese government gave the testimony of their experiences as ‘comfort women’ during the Asia Pacific War.

Shimada’s early series of etchings entitled “Past Imperfect” engaged with the artist's deep interest in gender roles while challenging the popular viewpoint that the Asia-Pacific War was an 'unavoidable tragedy.' She debuted this series together at Tanishima Gallery in Tokyo’s Meguro Ward in 1993, presenting 25 xerox transfer etchings compiled from newspaper clippings and archival photographs of various women during the Asia-Pacific War. Her imagery explored the role of Japanese women who had contributed to the Imperial war effort, in her attempt to intervene in this often overlooked reality of wartime responsibility.

The etching Shooting Lesson (1992) was regarded as one of the most critical works from the series, presenting a photograph of the wives of Japanese military police stationed in Korea receiving shooting lessons for self-protection against the local population, juxtaposed with the portraits of four Korean comfort women. Through these comparisons, Shimada sought to demonstrate how Japanese women also participated in and strengthened the war effort.

White Aprons (1993) is a triptych in which three different representations of Japanese women protecting their nation during the war are juxtaposed: one highlighting the role of housewife, one showcasing women learning to defend themselves from anti-Japanese attacks in the new Imperial colonies, and one in which members of the Japanese National Defence Women’s Organization see the soldiers off to war. In this triptych, as well as the installation Tied to Apron Strings (1993) that she created and exhibited during this time, Shimada depicted women wearing white aprons, kappōgi, as both a symbol of domesticity and motherhood and as a reminder of the uniform of the Dai Nippon Fujinkai, a Japanese women's patriotic organization formed during the war effort.

The etching A House of Comfort (1993) juxtaposed a mansion-like ‘comfort station,’ the state-sponsored brothel used by Japanese soldiers during the war, against a portrait of a disrobed ‘comfort woman’ as a visual narrative that questioned the idea of home, nation, and the cost of war.

=== Comfort/Women/of Conformity (1994) ===
Shimada created a 20-page artist book Comfort/Women/of Conformity (also referred to as Comfort Women, Women of Conformity) made up of photographic images and texts that juxtapose and problematize the experiences of Korean ‘comfort women’ and Japanese women during the Asia-Pacific War. Japanese women’s photographs and quotations are depicted on right-hand pages with the Korean women’s on the left. This layout starkly contrasted the texts of Japanese feminist writers who supported Imperial ideologies against the Korean women’s testimonies of kidnapping, rape, violence, and forced sexual slavery on the opposite pages. Shimada's artist book was mass produced through photocopying on gray and red construction paper.

=== Black Boxes + Voice Recorder (1996) ===
Shimada presented her installation piece, Black Boxes + Voice Recorder (1994) at the exhibition “Gender: Beyond Memory” at the Tokyo Metropolitan Museum of Photography in 1996. Close-up portraits of former ‘comfort women’ with their mouths cropped were placed inside chained black wooden boxes that were exhibited in the gallery with the lids off, while audial recordings of women’s voices giving testimony of their wartime experiences were played throughout the gallery continuously. Shimada’s installation aimed to give voices to women who have been historically silenced for generations. Curator Kasahara Michiko wrote of the exhibition, "[Shimada] represents a resistance to forgetfulness, an active will to remember. She is not an outsider, producing her work in some safe place; rather, as a Japanese woman she is placed in the ambiguous place of being one of the assailants.”

=== Made in Occupied Japan (1998) ===
Shimada has been collaborating with BuBu, a performance artist and AIDS activist since 1996. Their collaborative series, Made in Occupied Japan (1998) is made of up etching/photographic collages and a video performance that critically approach the history of the US post-war occupation of Japan through themes of sex and consumerism, pointing out the Americanization of Japanese culture and exoticization of Japanese women prevalent during postwar prostitution. Throughout the work, Shimada and BuBu use their own bodies to stage representations of US soldiers, Japanese military prostitutes, and Japanese housewife. They intentionally blur gender boundaries by posing as both male and female roles to expose and problematize the patriarchal power structure of Japanese society.

Shimada has often used drag in her artwork to explore gender roles, considering it a medium through which she can better understand the construction of her own position in society. On this topic Shimada has written, “putting on drag is not changing one’s identity completely. It is examining layers and complexities of one’s position."

=== Bones in Tansu: Family Secrets (2004) ===
In 2004, Shimada presented her interactive installation Bones in Tansu: Family Secrets as part of the exhibition “Borderline Cases” at A.R.T. in Ebisu, Tokyo, organized by the Feminist Art Action Brigade and curated by Kim Sunhat of the Mori Art Museum. The installation, in which she solicited the war memories of museum visitors and incorporated them into the exhibit, has also been exhibited in seven other international locations, including the Philippines, Thailand, Indonesia, Canada, and Denmark. This work allowed gallery visitors to enter a confession booth and privately write down their family secrets and submit them in a sealed box, which the artist could later select and display in a large tansu (traditional Japanese chest of drawers). Bones in Tansu: Family Secrets engaged with the way in which the memories of perpetrators and victims are repressed and forgotten as time goes by, forming an ‘ever-expanding’ dialogue that grew each time it was exhibited. Shimada has stated that this installation was her way of resisting the apathy of the younger generation, for whom the war history is being repressed by Japan’s older generations and the influence of Japanese nationalism and conservative historical revision of the Japanese education system.

This work may have been inspired by Shimada's own discovery that her grandfather had been a policemen before the war and was one of many ordered to “dispose of dangerous criminals” in the Kantō Massacre mass murdering of an estimated 6,000 ethnic Korean residents of Japan that followed the Great Kanto Earthquake of 1923.

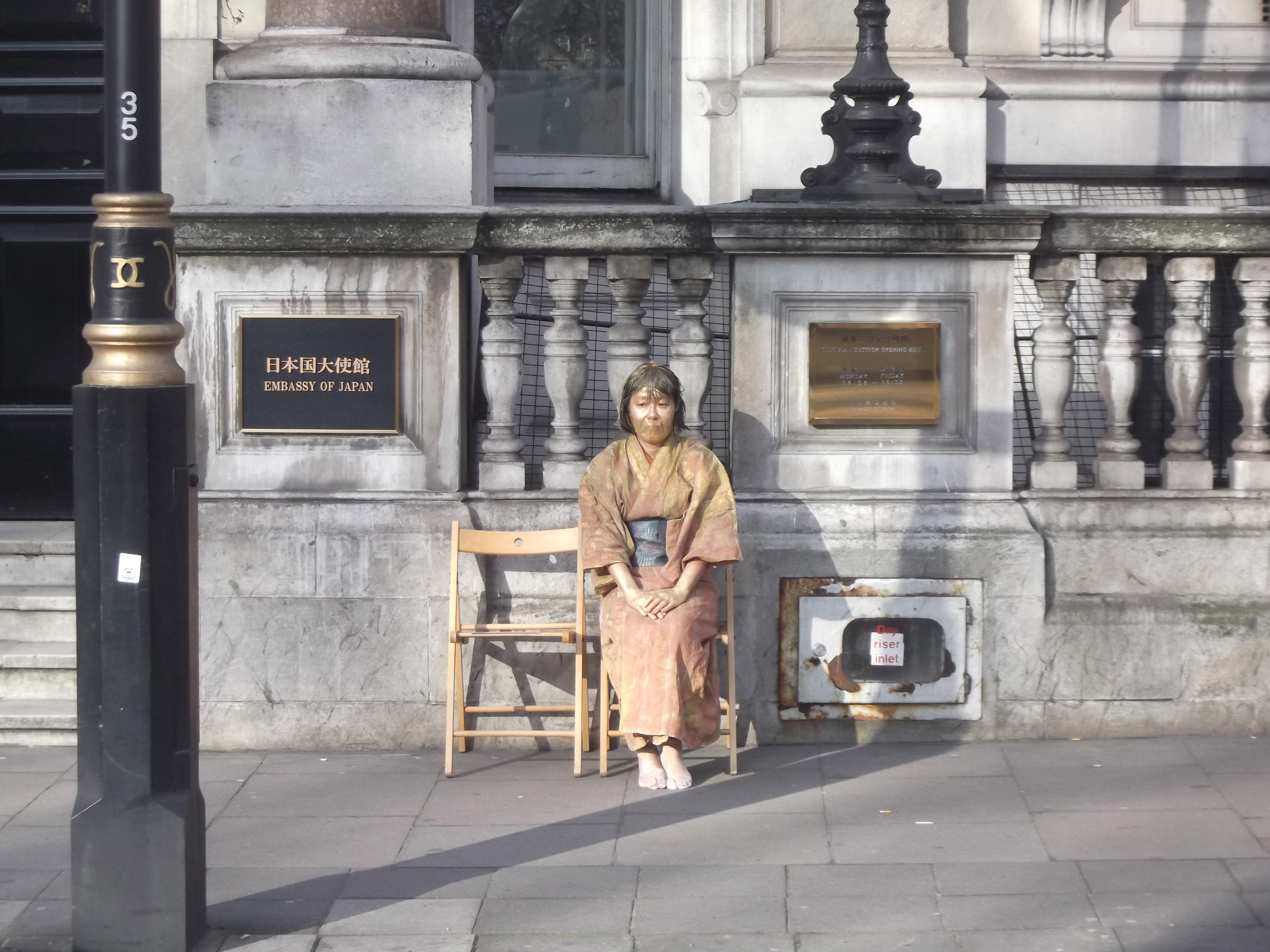
Becoming a statue of a Japanese comfort woman. (2012)

=== Becoming a Statue of a Japanese Comfort Woman (2012-Present) ===
Since 2012, Shimada has been performing Becoming a Statue of a Japanese Comfort Woman (originally entitled Missing). In the first iteration of this performance, she donned a Japanese kimono, painted her skin bronze, and sat in front of the Japanese Embassy in London for approximately one hour, in a reference to the tribute to Statue of Peace, the commemorative tribute to the enslaved Korean ‘comfort women’ of the Asia-Pacific War. Shimada’s choice to dress in a kimono rather than a traditional Korean hanbok, highlights that little known fact that Japanese women were also forced to serve as sexual slaves during the Asia-Pacific War.

Shimada has carried out this performance multiple times since 2012 at contested locations in Japan such as the Yasukuni Shrine and the National Diet, as well as in South Korea, and alongside the international feminist art collective Tomorrow Girls Troop in Los Angeles, U.S., Seoul, South Korea, and Tokyo, Japan

== Censorship ==
Although Shimada is now recognized as an important artist in Japan, the critical nature of her artwork initially made her career difficult because the exhibition and distribution of her work was generally more accepted in countries outside of her home country. Shimada opened up about her experiences dealing with censorship in Japan at a professional luncheon entitled “Freedom of Expression in the Arts” held in June 1994 at the Foreign Correspondents Club of Japan in Tokyo. She reported that although her work had never been explicitly shut down, she had experienced “soft” censorship in the form of audience outrage and curatorial reluctance, concluding that it is much easier for her to exhibit her work in Germany (where she was living at the time) than in her native Japan.

In 1993 Shimada staged a protest against the Toyama Modern Art Museum for its censorship and destruction of artist Ōura Nobuyuki’s satirical collage of Emperor Hirohito. She created an etching of the Showa Emperor with his face scratched out entitled A Picture to be Burned (1993), burned one of the prints, and sent its ashes in a plastic bag to the museum alongside a letter requesting her work be added to their collection. She wrote, “As some say that museums are graveyards of art, it may be appropriate to send you the ashes.”

A Picture to Be Burned (1993) was put in the spotlight again for its inclusion, alongside a representation of a ‘comfort woman,’ in the 2019 Aichi Triennale's "After 'Freedom of Expression?'" (in Japanese,『「表現の不自由展」その後」』), which led to the protest and closure of the exhibition.

Also in 2019, the Ministry of Foreign Affairs withdrew its support for another exhibition due to its political nature, the Japan Unlimited at the MuseumsQuartier Wien in Vienna, Austria, which also included one of Shimada’s etchings from her and BuBu’s Made in Occupied Japan (1998) series. The particular piece was a satirical image of Emperor Hirohito posing with the U.S. general Douglas MacArthur that aimed to blurred the boundaries of fixed categorizations of man/woman, USA/Japan, and perpetrator/victim.

== Curating ==
Shimada is active as a curator in Japan and internationally. With her longtime collaborator BuBu, she co-curated the controversial exhibition How to Use Women’s Body at Ota Fine Arts in 2000, which displayed the works of seven female and one male artists’ attempts to reclaim their bodies in their artwork. She curated Nakajima Yoshio Syndrome in 2015 at Atsukobarouh gallery in Shibuya, Tokyo, as well as From Nirvana to Catastrophe at Ota Fine Arts in 2017, for which she wrote and edited the exhibition catalogues. Shimada also curated the Bigakkō portion of the “Anti-Academy” exhibit at the John Hansard Gallery at the University of Southampton in 2013, an exhibition that examined the ideas, processes, and legacies of radical education models in the 1960s in Japan, the U.S. and Denmark.

== Exhibition history ==
=== Selected solo exhibitions ===
- "It's Not Yours to Decide!" Ota Fine Arts (2023), Tokyo
- "Being a Japanese Comfort Woman" street performance (2012), London/Tokyo
- Bones in Tansu - Family Secrets (2007) - Travelling Exhibition: University of Philippines (Manila), Chiang Mai University Art Museum (Chiang Mai, Thailand), Cemeti Art House (Yogkyakarta, Indonesia), and Galleri Christina Wilson, Copenhagen.
- Escape from 'Oneself' (2001), Centre A, Vancouver, Canada
- Kyoto Seika University Gallery (2000), Kyoto
- Asia/Pacific Studies Institute, New York, University, New York
- A Space Gallery (1997), Toronto
- John Batten Gallery (1997), Hong Kong
- Hiraya Gallery (1997), Manila
- Keio University Art Centre (1996), Tokyo
- Ota Fine Arts (1996, 1998, 2002), Tokyo

=== Selected group exhibitions ===
- Felt Experience (2007), Catalyst Arts, Belfast, Northern, Ireland
- Conceal/Confess (2007), Chiang mai University Art Museum, Thailand
- Doll House (2007), Shanghai Xuhui Art Museum, Shanghai
- Sex Arbeit (2006) NGBK Shanghai
- Mapping the Body (2006), NRLA Festival, Tramway, Glasgow
- Fantastic Asia (2005), Songkuk Museum, Seoul
- Life, actually (2005), Tokyo Metropolitan Museum of Contemporary Art, Tokyo
- Borderline Cases (2004), A.R.T. gallery, Toronto
- Trans-Okinawa (2003), Highway, Los Angeles
- City-net Asia (2003), Seoul City of art Museum, Seoul
- Seoul-Asia Art Now (2003), Maronier Art Centre, Seoul, Korea
- Attitude (2002), Kumatoto Cisty Museum of Contemporary Art, Kumamoto
- Empathy (2002), Fujikawa Gallery, Osaka
- East Asian Women and Herstories, Seoul Women's Center, Seoul, Korea
- There, Gwangju Biennale project 2, Gwangju, Korea
- Spirits (2001), workshops and theatre performance with Theatreworks, Singapore
- Sex and Consumerism (2001), Brighton University, Aberythowyth Art Centre, Wales and other venues in the UK
- Yume no Ato (2000), Haus am Waldsee Berlin, Kunsthalle Baden-Baden
- Dark Mirrors from Japan (2000), De Appel Foundation, Amsterdam
- Windows-inside, outside (1999), Gwanju City Art Museum, Gwangju, Korea
- Flexible Co-existence (1997), Art Tower Mito, Mito
- Lord of the Rim-in herself, for herself (1997), Hsing-chong Culture Centre, Taiwan
- Gender, beyond memories (1996), Tokyo Metropolitan Museum of Photography, Tokyo
- Age of Anxiety (1995), Powerplant, Toronto, Canada

== Public Collections ==
- New York Public Library, New York
- Tokyo Metropolitan Museum of Photography, Tokyo
- Keio University Art Center
- Kyoto Seika University, Kyoto
- City University of New York, New York

== Publications ==
- Yoshiko Shimada (1996) - Yoshiko Shimada, Research Centre for the Arts and Arts Administration, Keio University (Tokyo, Japan)https://www.librarycat.org/lib/Centre_A/item/156082270
- Divide and Rule: Yoshiko Shimada (1997) - Yoshiko Shimada, Catherine Osborne, Meg Taylor. A Space Gallery (Toronto, ON) ISBN 0969506872
- Yoshiko Shimada; Art Activism 1992-98 (1998) - Yoshiko Shimada. OTA Fine Arts (Tokyo, Japan)
- Twilight Sleep: Momoyo Torimitsu, Noboru Tsubaki, Ryoko Aoki Zon Ito, Ken Ikeda, Kyupi Kyupi, Hiroshi Ono, Yoshiko Shimada (2000) - Istituto Giaponese di Cultura (Rome, Italy)
- Escape from 'OneSelf' (2002), OTA Fine Arts (Tokyo, Japan)
