= 61st Venice Biennale =

2026 international contemporary art exhibition

- Genre: Art exhibition
- Begins: May 6, 2026 (preview), May 9, 2026 (public)
- Ends: November 22, 2026
- Location: Venice
- Country: Italy
- Previous event: 60th Venice Biennale (2024)

The 61st Venice Biennale is a global international contemporary art exhibition that is being held in 2026 with participants from 99 countries with public exhibitions days running from May 9 until November 22 with preview days started May 6.

The declared theme for the main curatorial exhibit as "In Minor Keys," which was selected by Koyo Kouoh, chief curator of the Zeitz Museum of Contemporary Art Africa. However Kouoh died a year before the opening, leaving her collaborators to fill out her vision.

This edition of the Venice Biennale has been marred by several controversies, including the resignation of the jury days before the festival was scheduled to start, an initial jury announcement that it would not give awards to countries whose leaders were being indicted for war crimes, and the absence of the Italian minister of culture for the first time in the biennale's history.

== Background ==
The Venice Biennale is an international art biennial exhibition held in Venice, Italy. Often described as "the Olympics of the art world", participation in the Biennale is a prestigious event for contemporary artists. The festival has become a constellation of shows: a central exhibition curated by that year's artistic director, national pavilions hosted by individual nations, and independent exhibitions throughout Venice. The Biennale parent organization also hosts regular festivals in other arts: architecture, dance, film, music, and theater.

Outside of the central, international exhibition, individual nations produce their own shows, known as pavilions, as their national representation. Nations that own their pavilion buildings, such as the 30 housed on the Giardini, are responsible for their own upkeep and construction costs as well. Nations without dedicated buildings create pavilions in the Venice Arsenale and palazzos throughout the city.

== Central exhibition ==
Koyo Kouoh, chief curator of the Zeitz Museum of Contemporary Art Africa, was selected to serve as the 61st Venice Biennale's artistic director but died in May 2025 from liver cancer only days after a diagnosis. Nonetheless, the festival, in conjunction with the family continued her theme of "In Minor Keys."

Ultimately there were 110 invited participants.

== Controversies ==
The decision of the Biennale's president, Pietrangelo Buttafuoco, to permit the participation of Russia, Israel and the United States has provoked protests from a broad spectrum of parties, including private individuals, government ministries and benefactors.

=== Participation of Israel ===
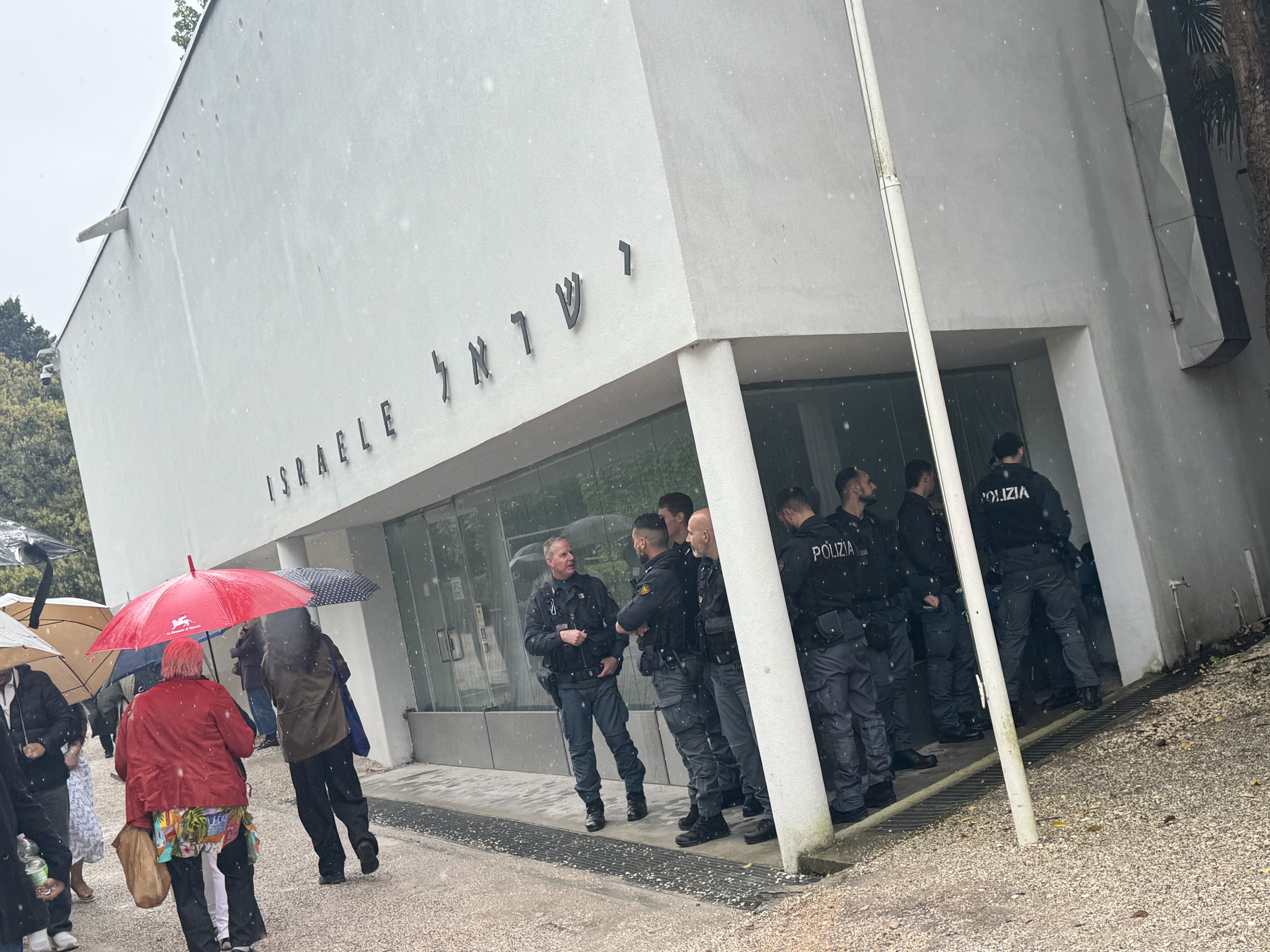
Police guarding the Israeli Pavilion during the 2026 Venice Biennale

In excess of two hundred participants of the Venice Biennale affixed their signatures to a letter, organised by the Art Not Genocide Alliance (ANGA), which demanded the cancellation of the Israeli Pavilion.

The Israeli exhibition shall not be housed within the traditional pavilion situated in the principal grounds of the Biennale, known as the Giardini, but shall instead be installed in the Arsenale section.

After the jury announced it would not award prizes to artists from countries whose leaders were being tried for war crimes, Israel's foreign ministry released a statement saying that excluding Israeli artists had "transformed the Biennale from an open artistic space of free, boundless ideas into a spectacle of false, anti-Israeli political indoctrination".

=== Participation of Russia ===
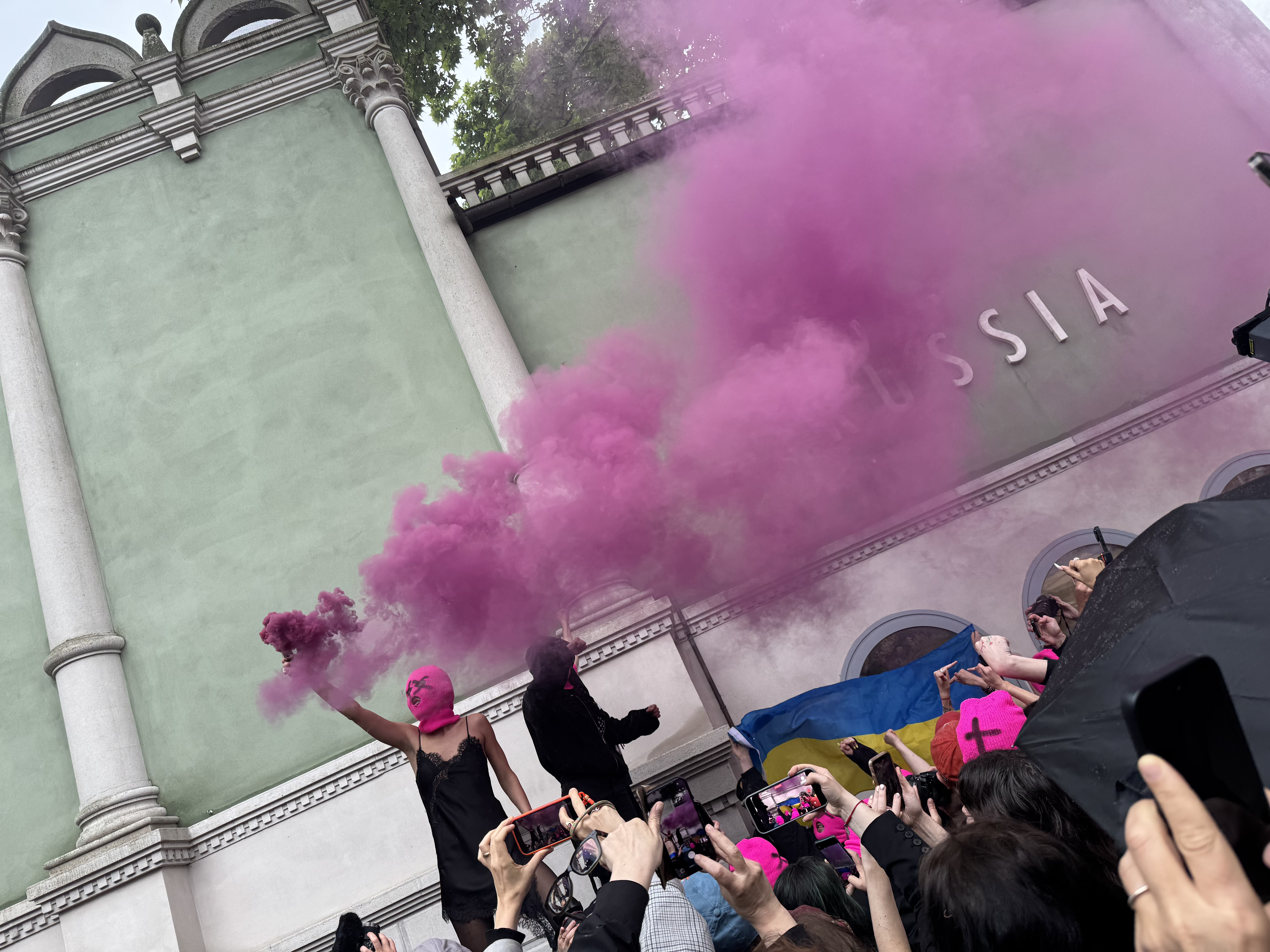
Protestors from Pussy Riot at the Russian Pavilion during 2026 Venice Biennale opening day, May 6, 2026.

After being absent from the 2022 and 2024 editions of the Venice Biennale following the invasion of Ukraine, the Russian Pavilion was accepted for the 2026 edition with an exhibit titled "The Tree is Rooted in the Sky". Its inclusion came despite the objections of the Italian minister of culture, who vowed to boycott the opening ceremonies, a protest unprecedented in the Biennale's history. The European Commission condemned Russia's participation and threatened to withdraw a $2 million grant for the event; however, the decision had not been reversed by 11 May.

Russia subsequently announced that its pavilion would not be open to the public during the exhibition, although the media would be permitted to visit during the preview days. The work, which comprises floral pieces, remained visible through the building's windows.

=== Participation of the United States ===
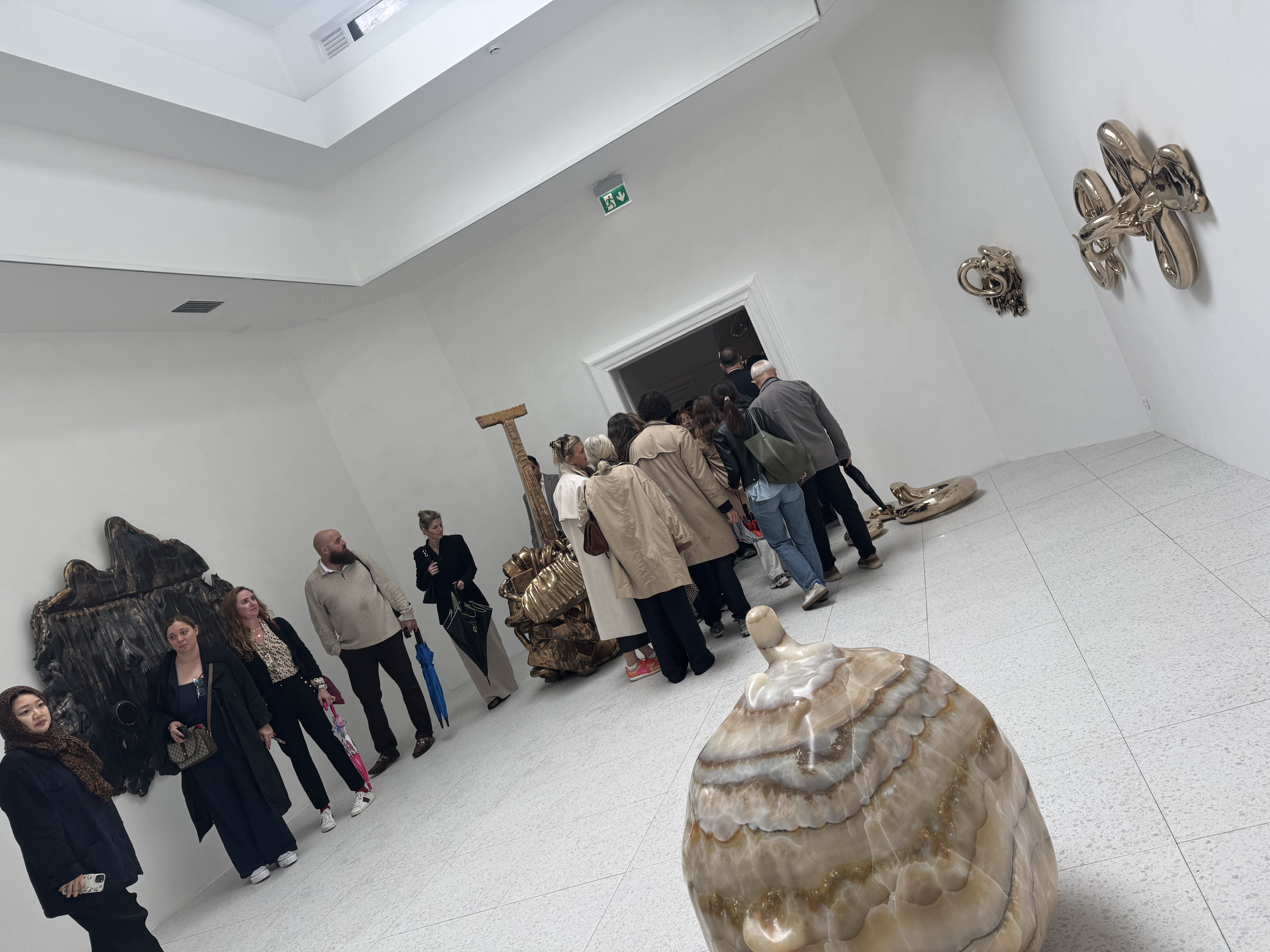
Opening day at the American Pavilion during the 2026 Venice Biennale

The United States employed an atypical selection process for its pavilion. Officials at the State Department abandoned the decades-long practice of using an independent review panel to choose the artist, instead appointing a commissioner, Jenni Parido, who had no museum experience but ran a pet food company. Officials then struggled to find an artist willing to represent the country, with at least two rejecting the offer, partly on account of the financial risk. The curator, Jeffrey Uslip, ultimately selected Alma Allen, a U.S.-born artist resident in Mexico. Two of his galleries subsequently withdrew from international representation.

The United States was also criticised by Anish Kapoor for its "abhorrent politics of hate" and "incessant warmongering".

=== Participation of South Africa ===
South Africa withdrew its participation after the country's minister of culture cancelled Elegy, a video installation by Gabrielle Goliath that mourns the victims of Israel's attack on Gaza, as the South African pavilion's selection for the forthcoming 61st Venice Biennale.

The work was instead relocated to the Chiesa di Sant'Antonin in Castello, a historic church dating back to the seventh century.

=== Resignation of the Jury ===
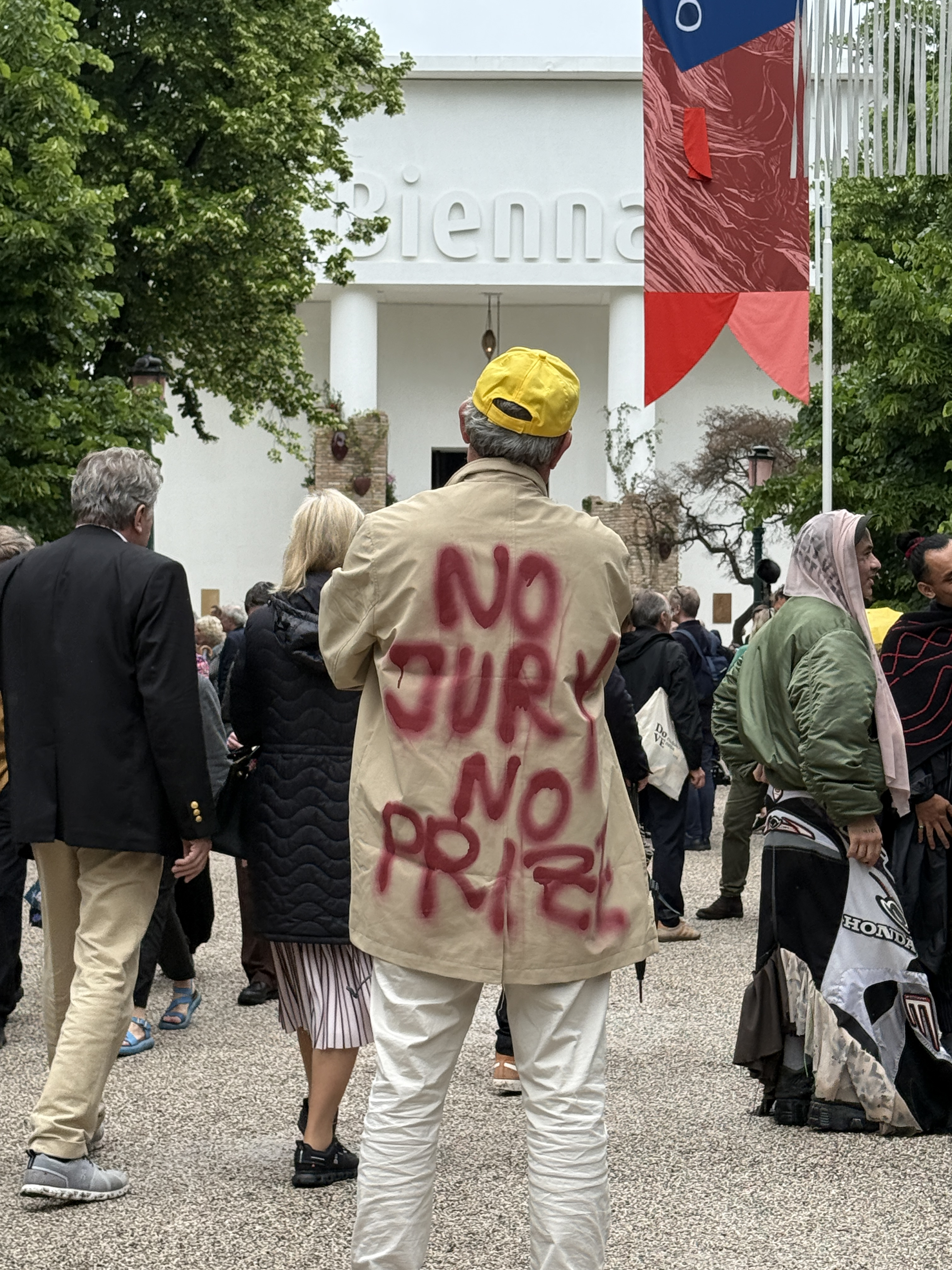
No Jury No Prize

On 30 April 2026, it was announced that all jurors of the Biennale had decided to resign their positions. The jury comprised five members, led by the Brazilian Solange Farkas. The other members were Zoe Butt (Australia), Elvira Dyangani Ose (Spain), Marta Kuzma (US) and Giovanna Zapperi (Italy). Although no country was named explicitly, all five jurors declared their reluctance to honour artists from countries whose leadership is subject to investigation by the International Criminal Court. This would have applied to Russia and Israel; arrest warrants have been issued against Putin (since 2023) and Netanyahu (since 2024).

In response, the Israeli artist Belu-Simion Fainaru, representing the Israeli Pavilion at the 2026 Biennale, sent a formal warning citing "racial discrimination" and "anti-Semitism", and indicated the possibility of an appeal to the European Court of Human Rights. The Foundation's legal team also stated that the jurors themselves could be held personally liable for any damages arising from a dispute.

As the Biennale now lacks a jury, the award ceremony was postponed from the opening to the close of the festival, and it remained unclear whether awards would be distributed. In their place, two "Leoni dei Visitatori" (Visitors' Lions), a gold and a silver, are to be awarded by visitors to the exhibitions. Consequently, the awards ceremony scheduled for 9 May 2026 was postponed to 22 November 2026.

=== Australian pavilion ===
In February 2025, Australia selected Khaled Sabsabi and curator Michael Dagostino to create a work for the Australia Pavilion, only to rescind the decision a week later after the News Corp outlet The Australian raised concerns and the matter was brought before Parliament. The reversal prompted outrage within the artistic community and led to resignations from the board of the commissioning body, Creative Australia; the five other shortlisted artistic teams declared that they would not permit their work to be shown. A senator described the affair as an "international embarrassment", while the artist stated that he could no longer sleep, had suffered nightmares, and was deeply traumatised. A crowdfunding campaign and a "plea for help" to support an independent participation by the artist were subsequently launched. Several members of staff and the board resigned, the outrage among artists prompted calls for further resignations, and a letter from staff members condemned a "culture of fear, discrimination and mismanagement". Following an independent review and significant public pressure, the decision was reversed in July 2025. Creative Australia apologised to Sabsabi, and he was officially reinstated as the Australian representative for 2026.

=== May 8 artist strike ===
A number of pavilions closed on Friday, 8 May, as artists staged a strike in protest against Israel's participation. Those affected included the pavilions of Austria, Japan, South Korea, France, Belgium, the Netherlands and Egypt, among others.

=== European Commission Funding ===
After an query into the opening of the Russian pavilion, Kaja Kallas announced on 13 July 2026 that the European Commission had halted funding to the Venice Biennale.

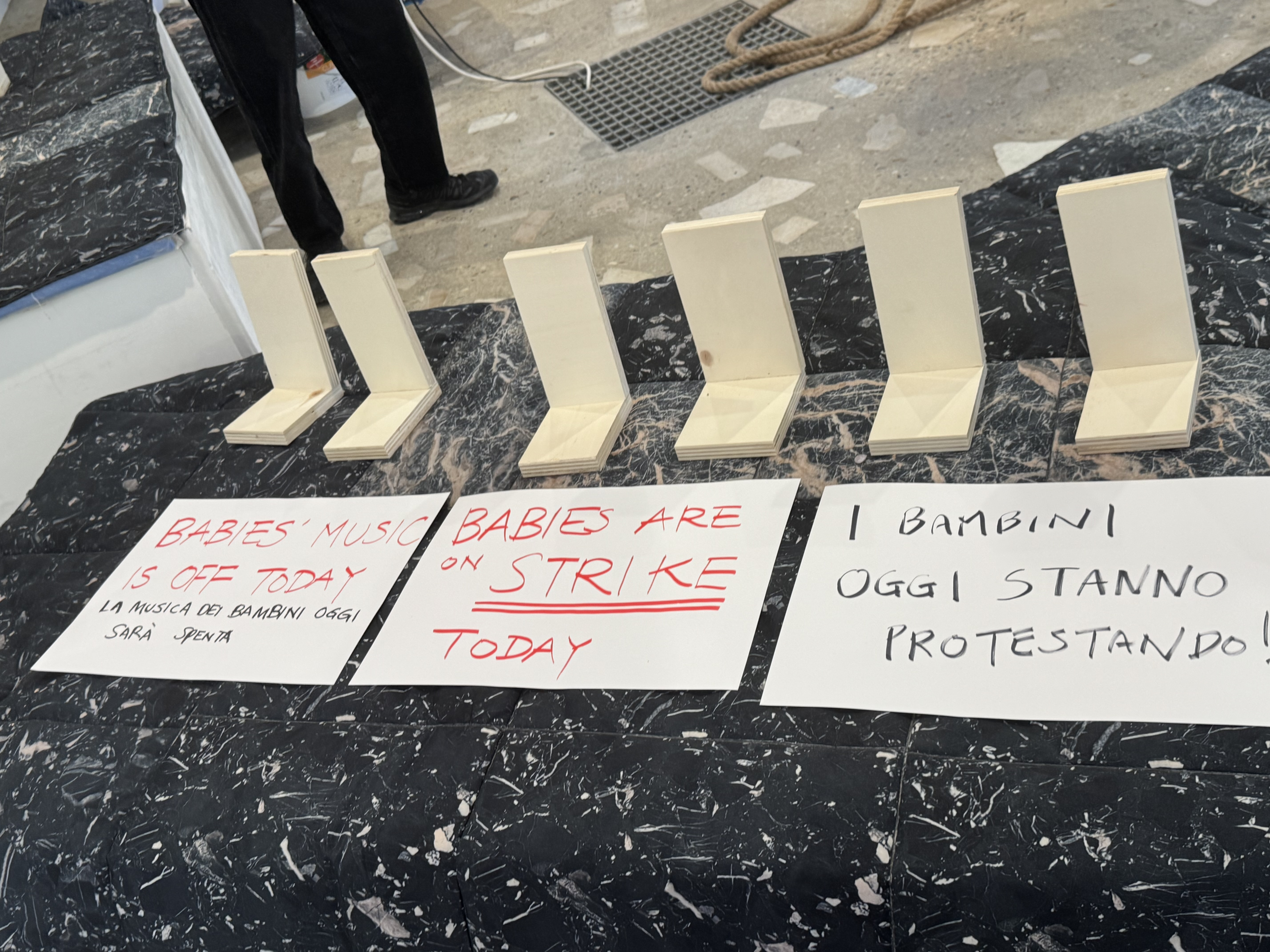
Artists on strike at the Japan Pavilion

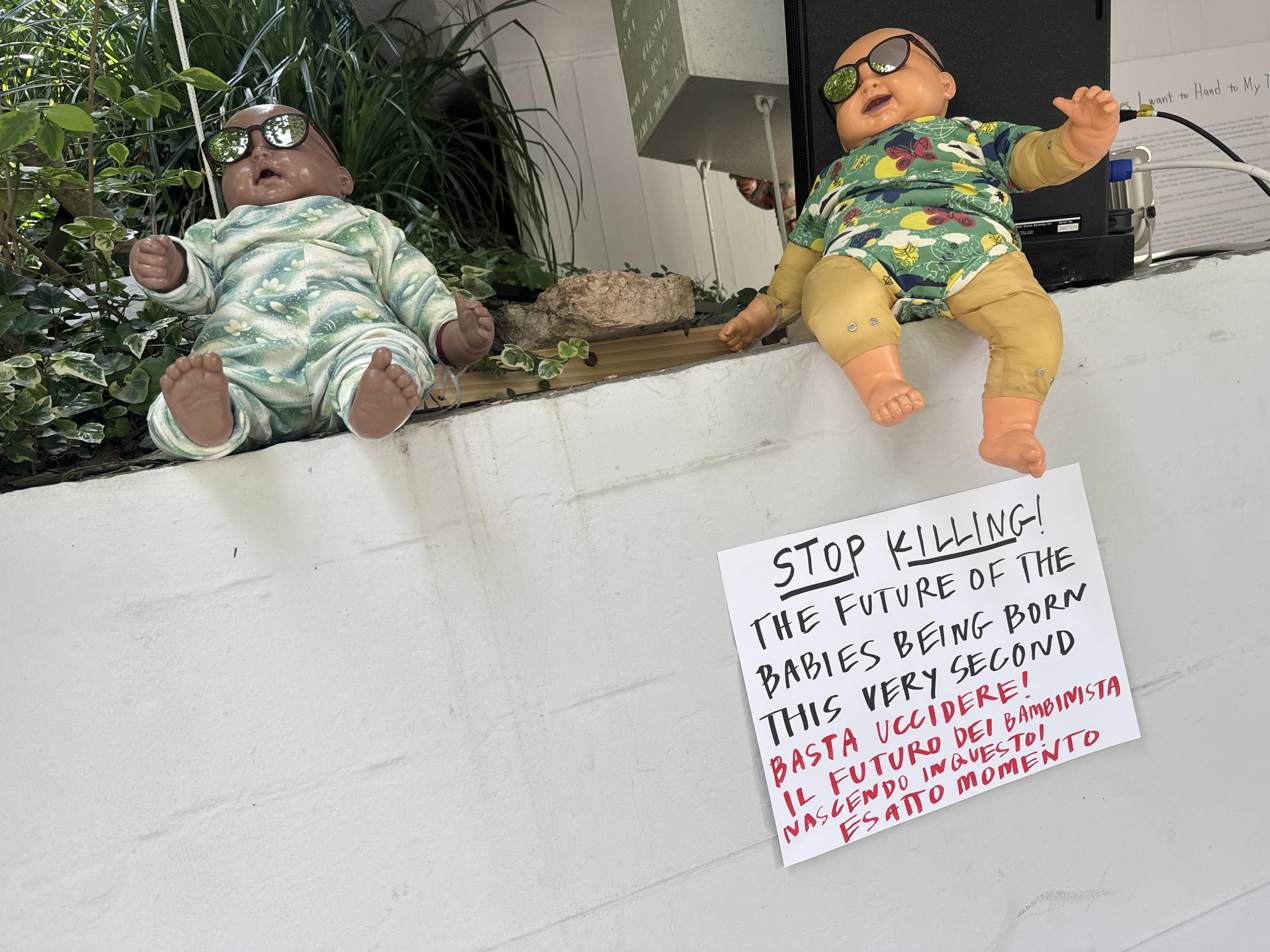
Baby dolls on strike

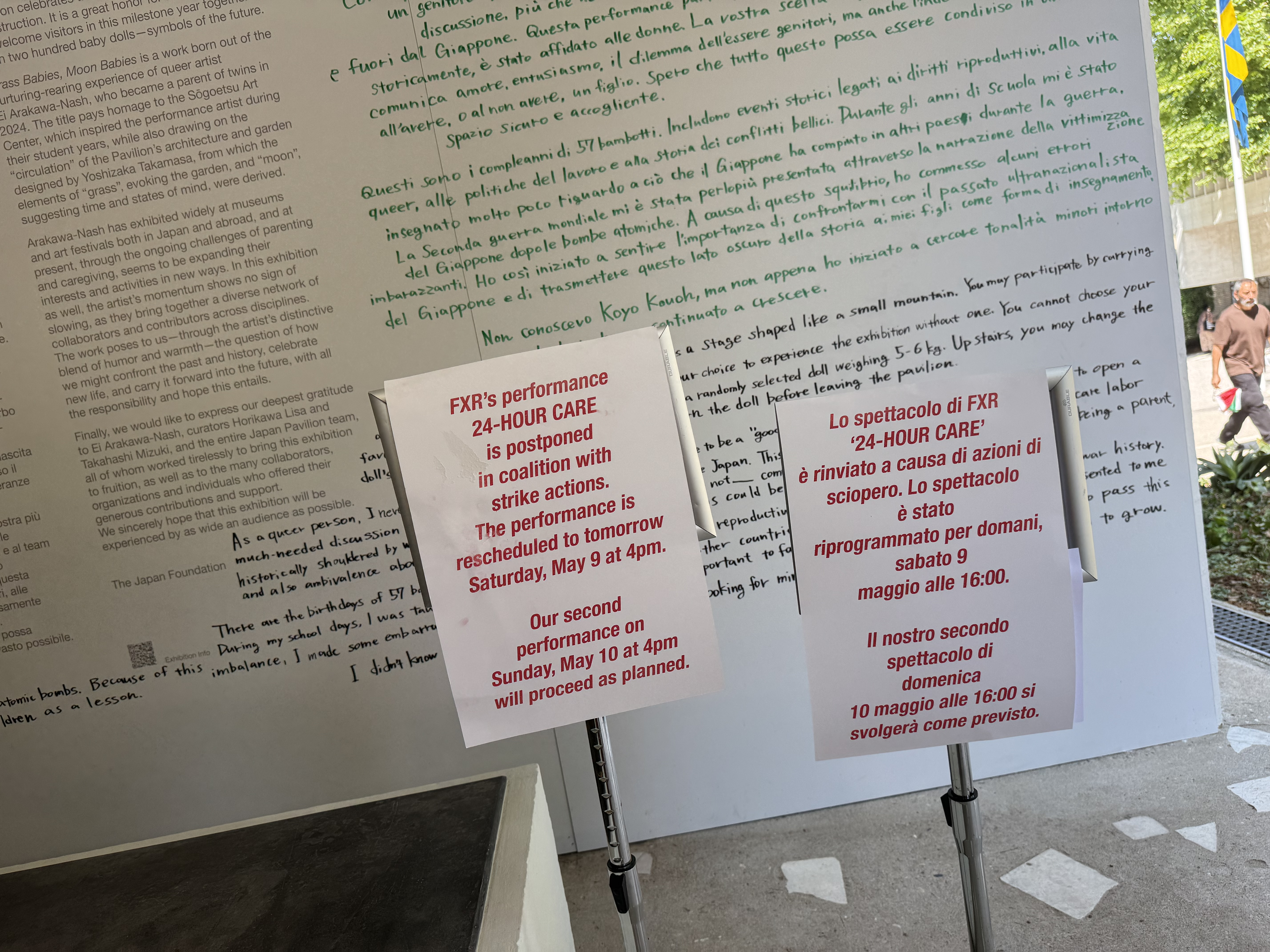
Signs of protest at the Japan Pavilion

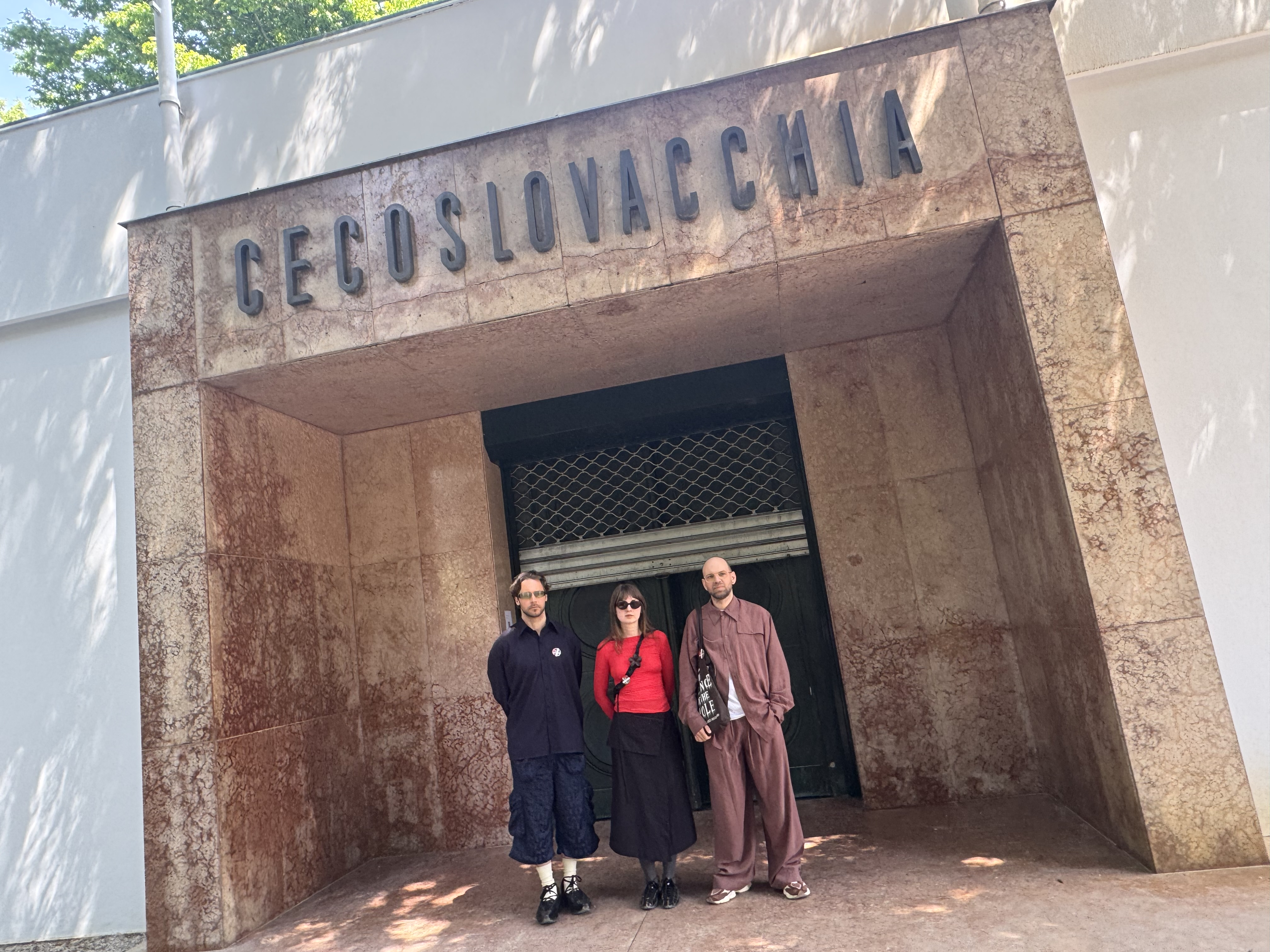
Artists and curators on strike at Czech and Slovak Pavilion

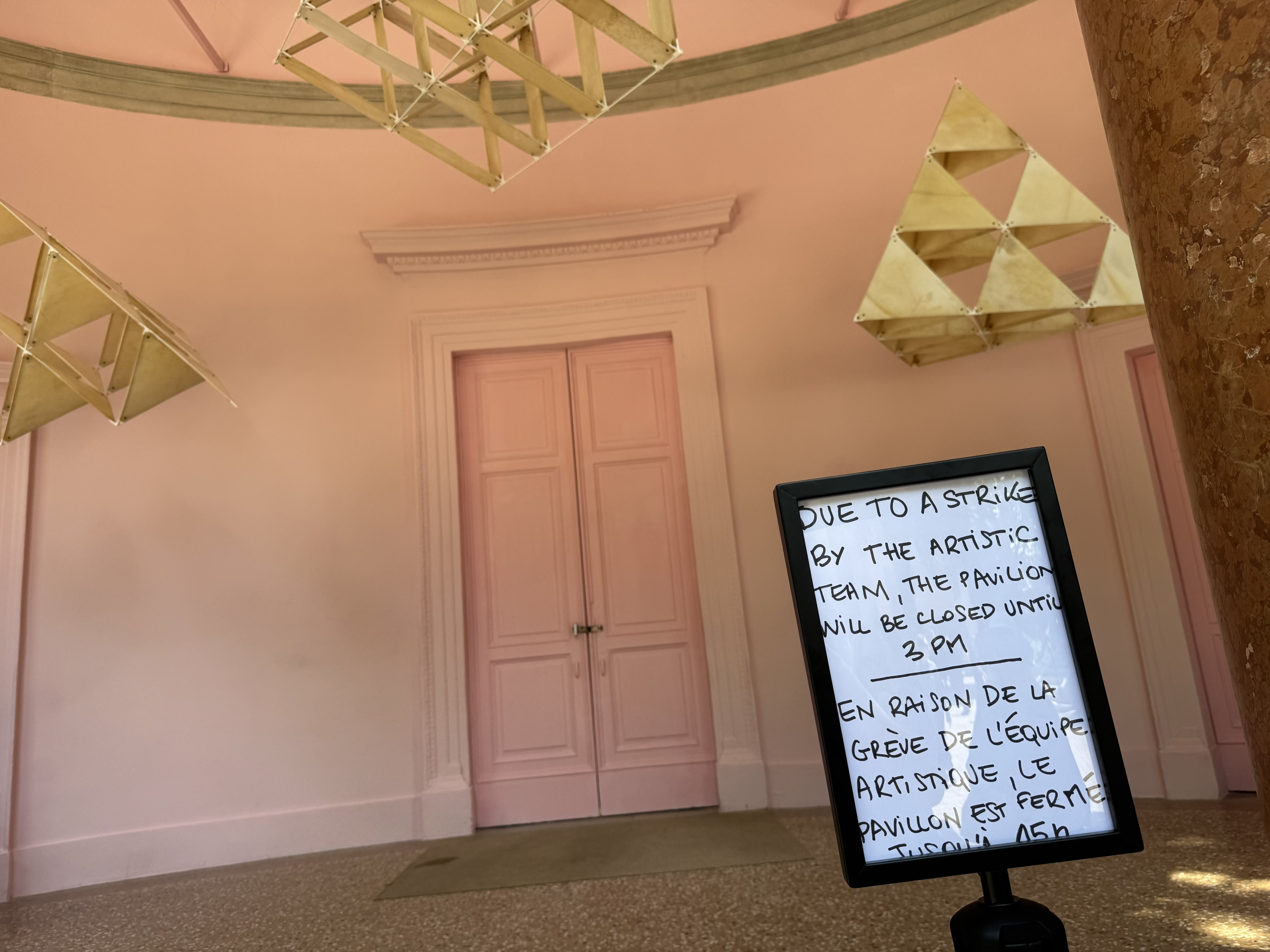
France Pavilion on strike

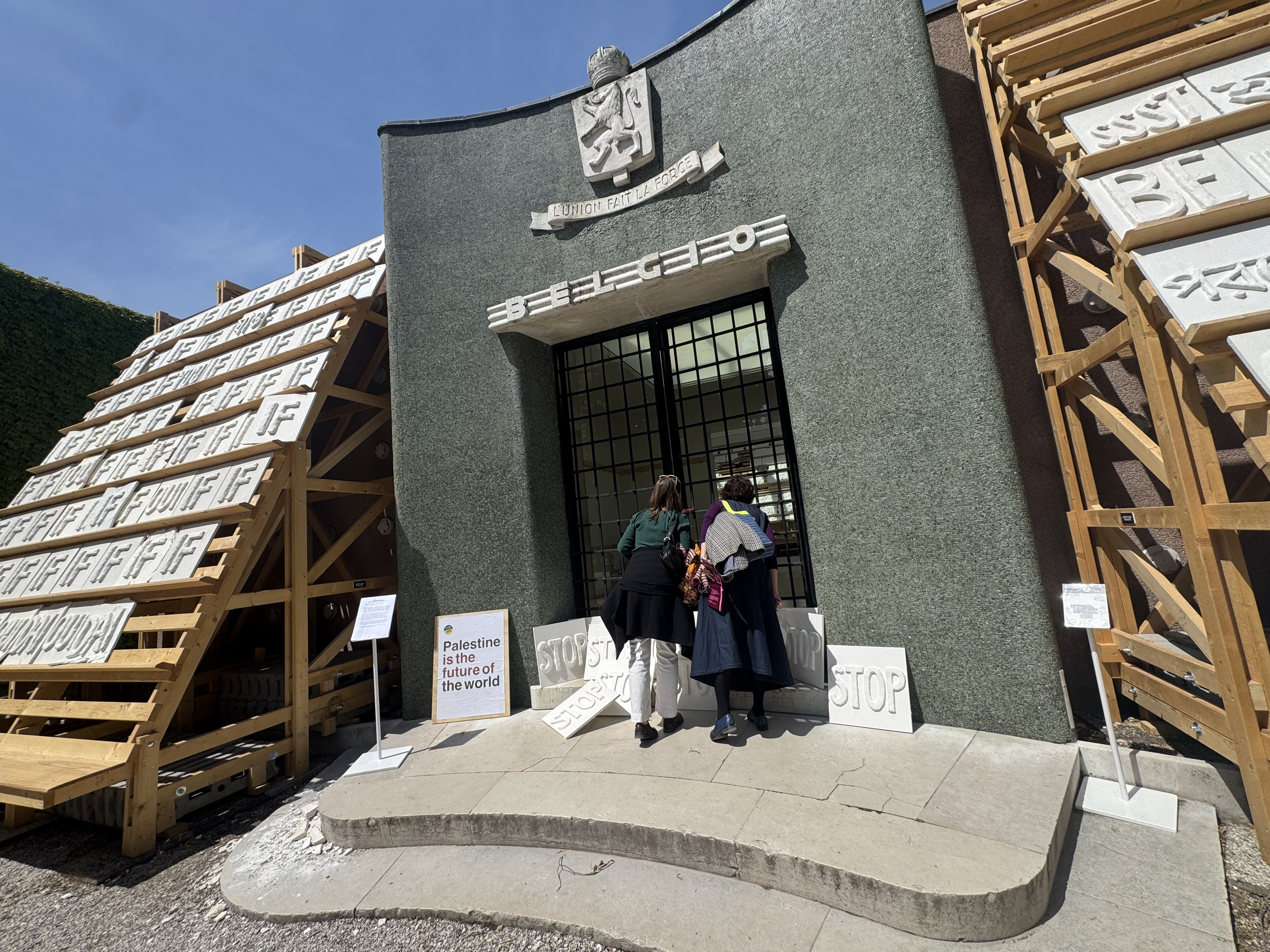
The chained doors of Belgium Pavilion

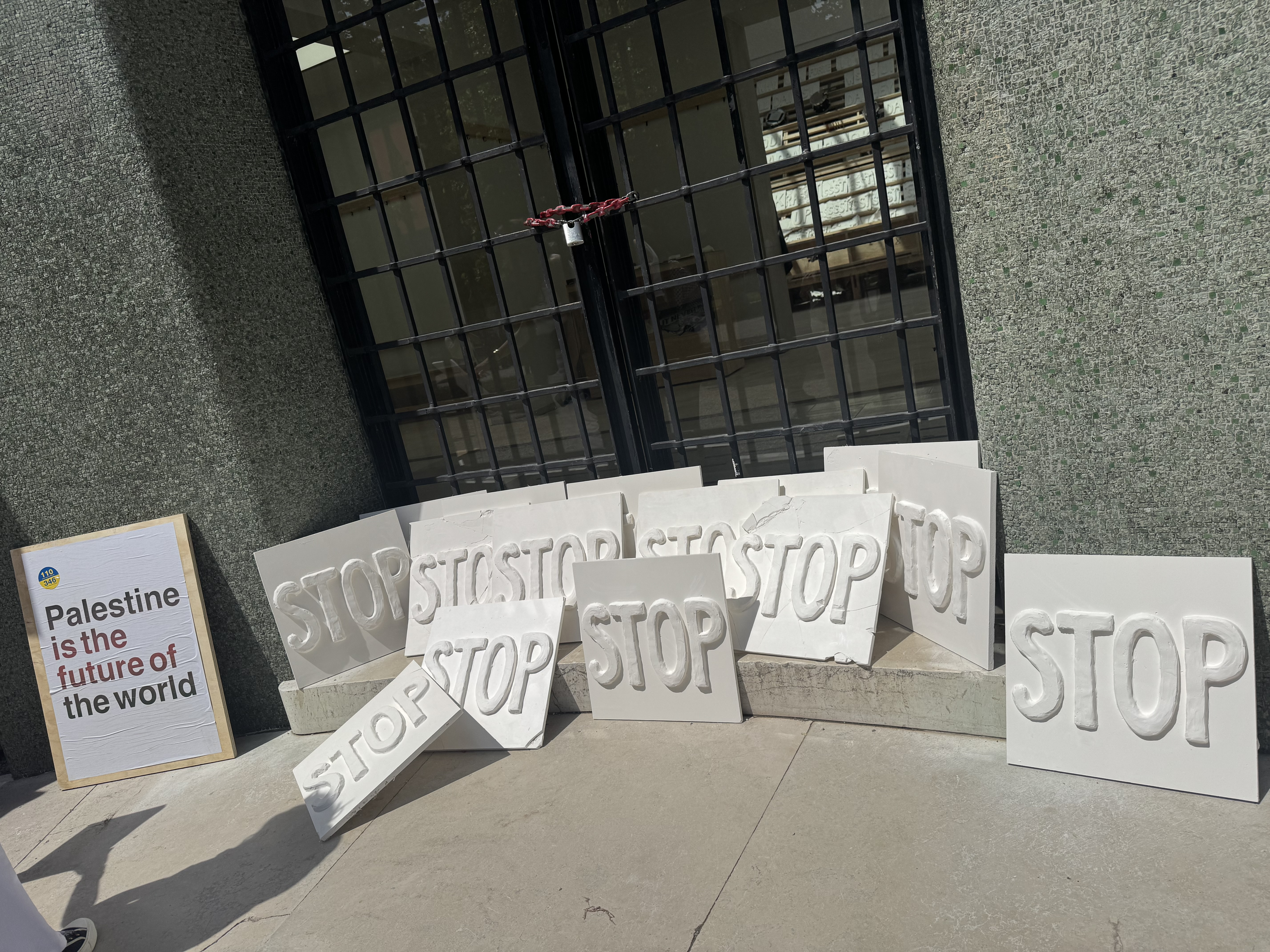
Signs blocking the Belgium Pavilion

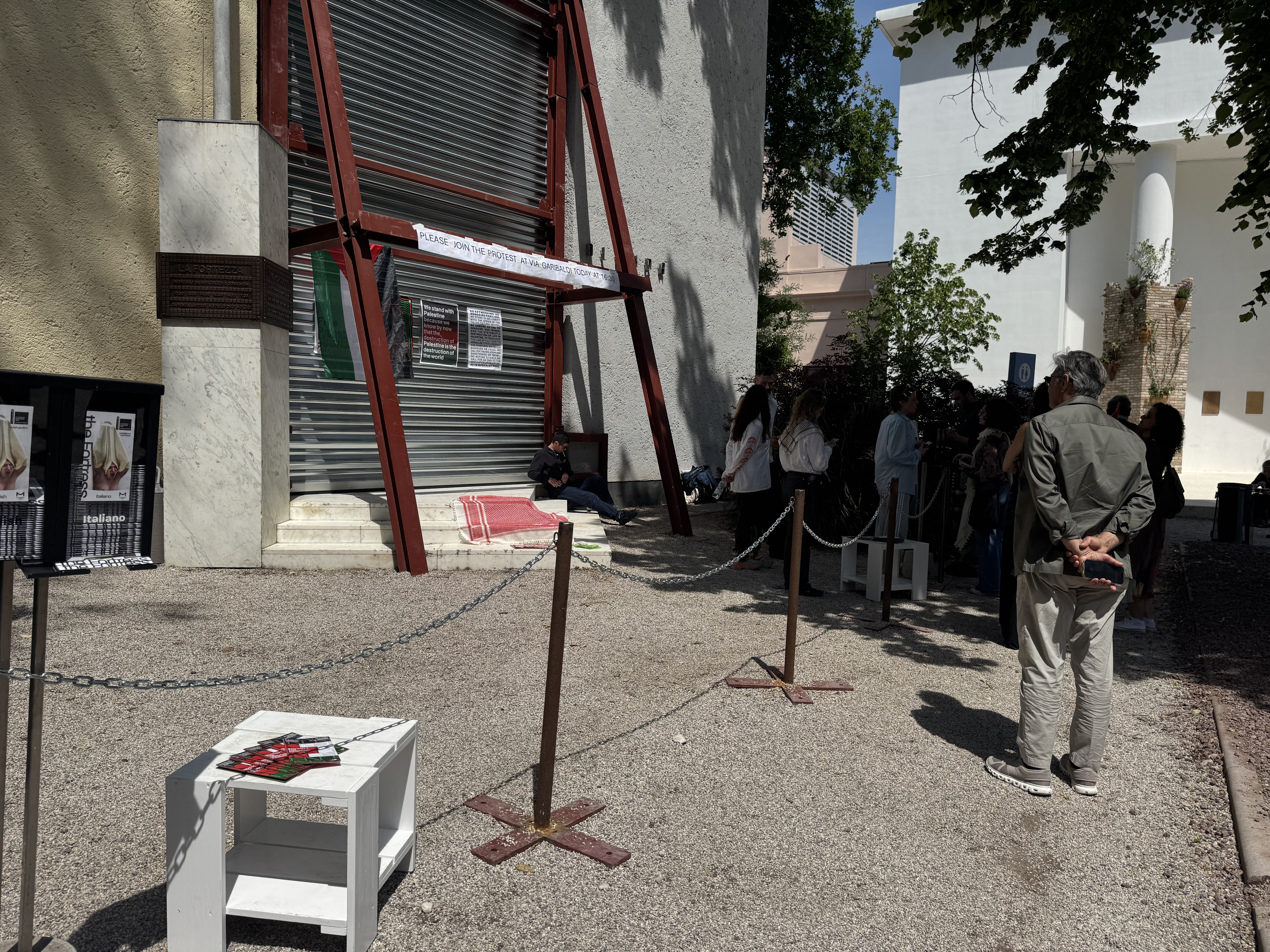
The shuttered Netherlands Pavilion

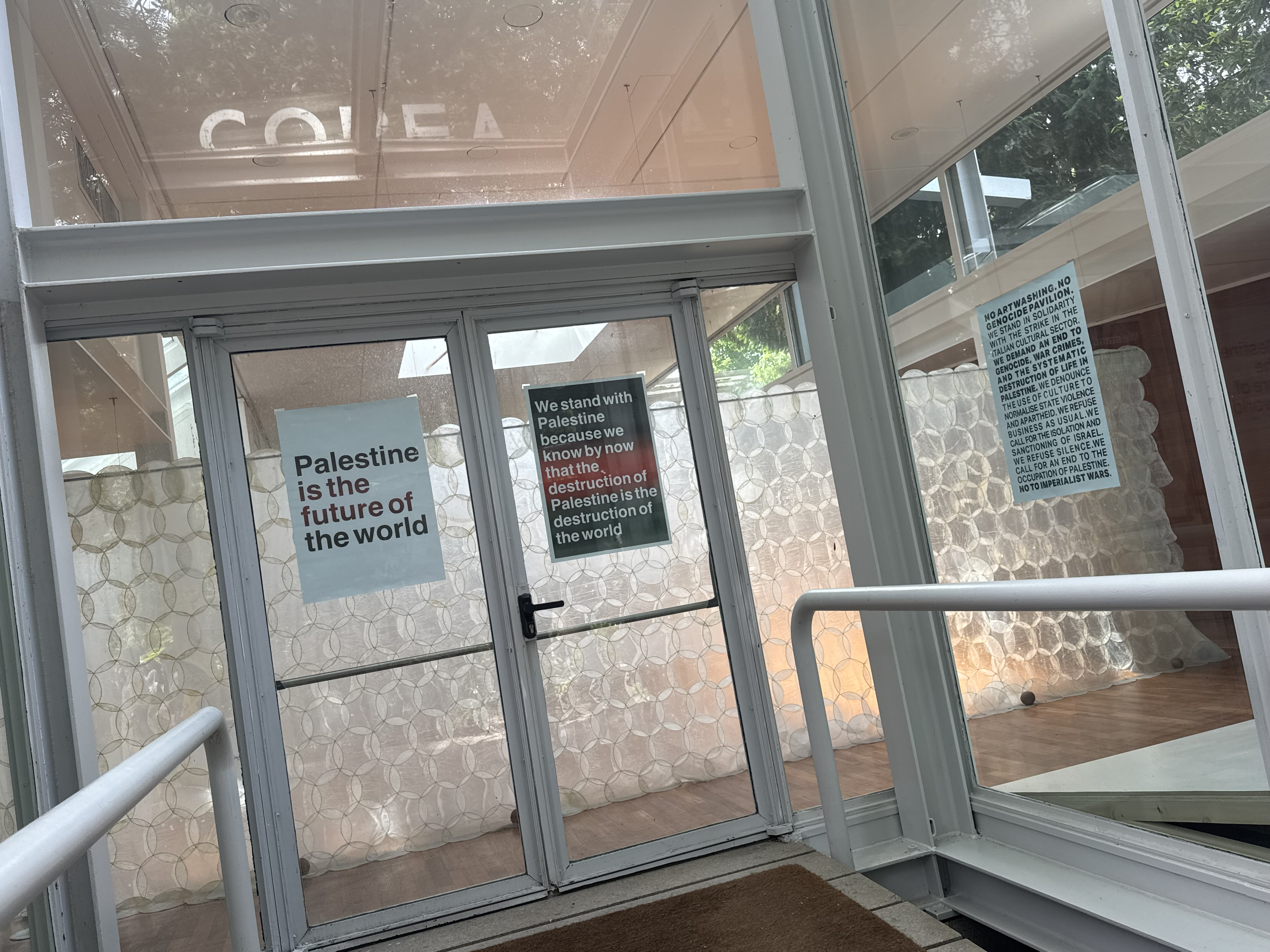
Shuttered South Korea Pavilion

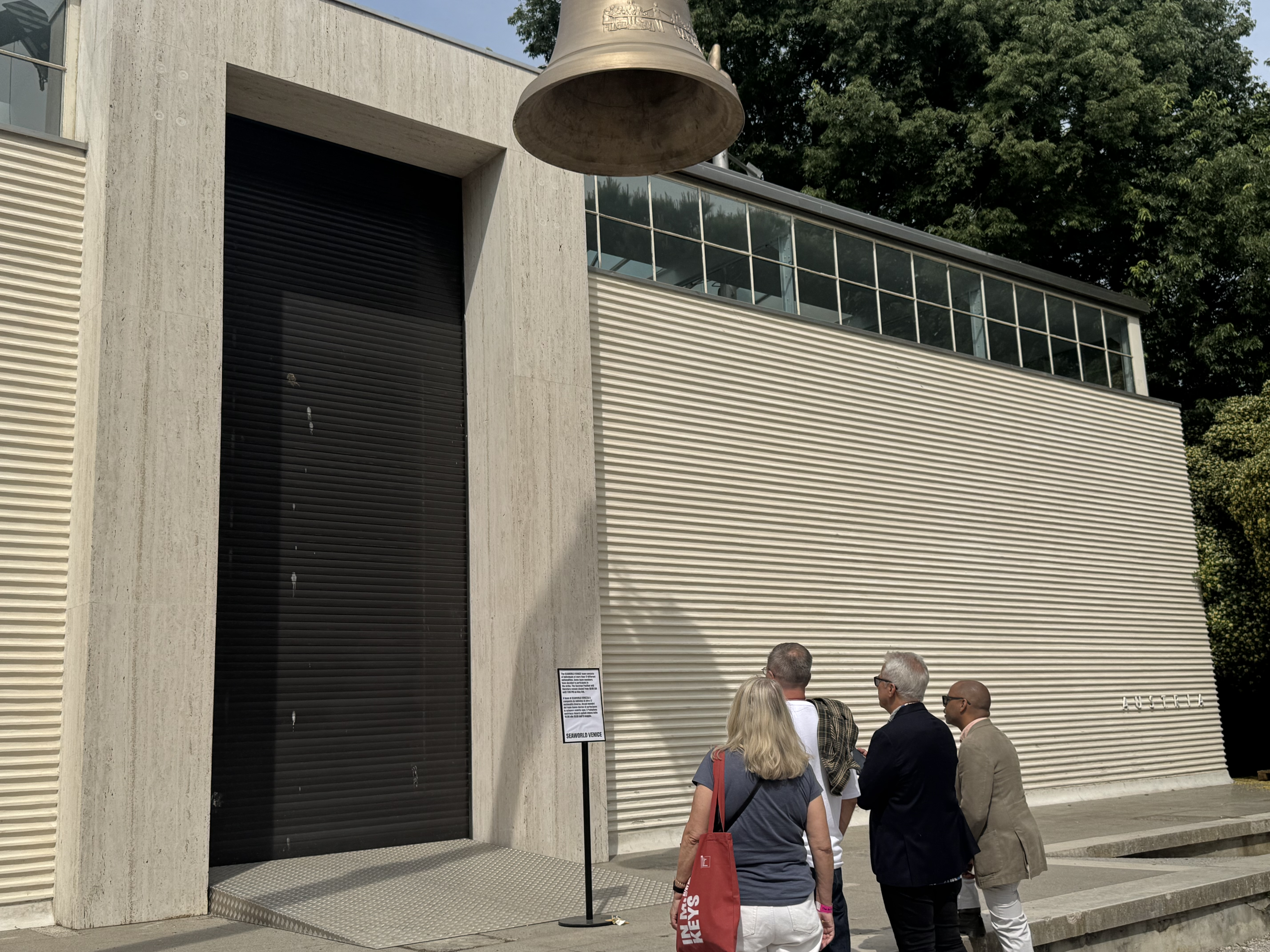
Shuttered Austrian Pavilion

== National pavilions ==
Countries began to announce their national representatives even before the previous exhibition closed in 2024. Each country selects artists to show at their pavilion, ostensibly with an eye to the Biennale's theme.

Countries who had official national pavilions for the first time at the 61st Biennale included Democratic Republic of the Congo, Republic of Guinea, Republic of Equatorial Guinea, Republic of Nauru, Republic of Sierra Leone, Federal Republic of Somalia, and the Socialist Republic of Vietnam. Separately, El Salvador participated for the first time with its own dedicated pavilion.

Nation	Location	Artist(s)	Curator(s)	Ref
Albania	Giardini	Genti Korini	Małgorzata Ludwisiak	
Argentina	Giardini	Matías Duville	Josefina Barciak	
Australia	Giardini	Khaled Sabsabi	Michael Dagostino	
Austria	Giardini	Florentina Holzinger	Nora-Swantje Almes	
Azerbaijan	Campo de la Tana, Castello	Faig Ahmed	Gwendolyn Collaço	
The Bahamas	Giardini	Lavar Munroe and John Beadle	Krista Thompson	
Belgium	Giardini	Miet Warlop	Caroline Dumalin	
Brazil	Giardini	Rosana Paulino, Adriana Varejão	Diane Lima	
Bulgaria	Giardini	Gery Georgieva, Maria Nalbantova, Rayna Teneva, Veneta Androva	Martina Yordanova	
Canada	Giardini	Abbas Akhavan	Kim Nguyen	
Croatia	Gardini	Dubravka Lošić	Branko Franceschi	
Cyprus	Gardini	Marina Xenofontos	Kyle Dancewicz	
Czechia and Slovakia	Gardini	Jakub Jansa, Tomáš Kocka Jusko, Alex Selmeci	Peter Sit	
Denmark	Giardini	Maja Malou Lyse	Chus Martínez	
The Netherlands	Giardini	Dries Verhoeven	Rieke Vos	
Egypt	Giardini	Armen Agop	Armen Agop	
Estonia	Around Venice	Merike Estna		
Finland	Gardini	Jenna Sutela	Stefanie Hessler	
France	Giardini	Yto Barrada	Myriam Ben Salah	
Democratic Republic of Congo	Antico Refettorio – Scuola Grande di San Marco	Sammy Baloji, Arlette Bashizi, Patrick Bongoy, Damso, Gosette Lubondo, Nelson Makengo, Aimé Mpané, Léonard Pongo, Géraldine Tobé	Yala Kisukidi	
Great Britain	Giardini	Lubaina Himid	Ese Onojeruo	
Greece	Giardini	Andreas Angelidakis	George Bekirakis	
Hungary	Giardini	Endre Koronczi	Luca Cserhalmi	
Iceland	Docks Cantieri Cucchini	Ásta Fanney Sigurðardóttir	Margrét Áskelsdóttir and Unnar Örn Auðarson	
Indonesia	Scuola Internazionale di Grafica, Cannaregio	Agus Suwage, Syahrizal Pahlevi, R .E. Hartanto, Nurdian Ichsan, Theresia Agustina Sitompul (Terre), Mariam Sofrina and Rusyan Yasin	Aminudin TH Siregar	
Ireland	Around Venice	Isabel Nolan	Georgina Jackson	
Italy	Arsenale	Chiara Camoni	Cecilia Canziani	
Japan	Giardini	Ei Arakawa-Nash	Lisa Horikawa, Mizuki Takahashi	
Korea (Republic of)	Gardini	Goen Choi, Hyeree Ro	Binna Choi	
Luxembourg	Around Venice	Aline Bouvy	Stilbé Schroeder	
Malta	Arsenale	Adrian MM Abela, Charlie Cauchi, Raphael Vella	Margerita Pulè	
Nauru	Around Venice	Kauw Tsitsi, CPS-Chamber of Public Secrets, Patricia Jacomella Bonola, Tedo Rekhviashvili, Sylvia Grace Borda, Ron Laboray, Dorian Batycka, Khaled Hafez, Iv Toshain, Stefano Cagol	Khaled Ramadan, Camilla Boemio, Stefano Cagol	
Nordic pavilion	Giardini	Benjamin Orlow, Klara Kristalova, Tori Wrånes	Anna Mustonen	
Poland	Giardini	Daniel Kotowski, Bogna Burska	Ewa Chomicka, Jolanta Woszczenko	
Portugal	Palacio Fondaco Marcello	Alexandre Estrela	Ana Baliza and Ricardo Nicolau	
Romania	Giardini	Anca Benera, Arnold Estefán	Corina Oprea, Diana Marincu	
Saudi Arabia	Giardini	Dana Awartani	Antonia Carver	
Syria	Around Venice	Sara Shamma	Yuko Hasegawa	
Switzerland	Giardini	Miriam Laura Leonardi, Yul Tomatala, Nina Wakeford	Gianmaria Andreetta, Luca Beeler	
Taiwan	Around Venice	Li Yi-Fan		
United States of America	Giardini	Alma Allen	Jeffrey Uslip	
Uruguay	Giardini	Margaret Whyte	Patricia Bentancur	

=== Belarusian independent participation ===
Although Belarus did not have an official state-sponsored national pavilion due to the political aftermath of the 2020 protests, the country was represented by an independent collateral event titled "Official. Unofficial. Belarus." Organized by the Belarus Free Theatre and curated by Natalia Kaliada and Daniela Kaliada, the immersive exhibition took place in the Chiesa di San Giovanni Evangelista. The project aimed to recreate the atmosphere of totalitarian control, censorship, and political repression. The opening of the exhibition was attended by prominent Belarusian democratic leaders and figures of the 2020 protests, including Sviatlana Tsikhanouskaya, Maria Kalesnikava, and Viktar Babaryka.

Among the featured artworks were a 2.5-meter sphere conceptualized by Mikalai Khalezin made of 336 books banned in Belarus, a cross constructed from CCTV cameras, and traditional Belarusian straw amulets (pavuki) made from metal prison bars by Vladimir Tsesler. The exhibition also included monumental paintings by Siarhiej Hrynievič, a 20-minute organ soundscape by composer Volha Padhajskaja, and a culinary metaphor of imprisonment—a tasteless wafer causing temporary facial numbness—created by the Michelin-starred Danish chef Rasmus Munk.
