= Cecilia Canziani =

Cecilia Canziani (born 1976) is an Italian art historian, curator and educator. Born and based in Rome, she co-directed the Nomas Foundation from 2009 to 2016 and later co-founded the contemporary art research centre IUNO. In 2026, she curated the Italian Pavilion at the 61st Venice Biennale.

== Early life and education ==
Canziani was born in Rome in 1976. She graduated from Sapienza University of Rome and attended the School of Specialisation in Art History at the University of Siena. She received a master's degree in curating from Goldsmiths, University of London, and a PhD in art history from the University of Naples Federico II.

== Career ==
Canziani was a founding member of the Rome curatorial collective, the 1:1 Project. From 2009 to 2016, she co-directed the Nomas Foundation in Rome with Ilaria Gianni. Their projects included A Performance Cycle (2010), which commissioned performances by Ryan Gander, Pierre Leguillon, Tris Vonna-Michell and Patrizio Di Massimo.

From 2011 to 2014, Canziani worked with Simone Menegoi and Andrea Zegna on ZegnArt, a public-art program established by the Ermenegildo Zegna Group. She was a research fellow at the Henry Moore Foundation in Leeds in 2014.

Canziani has curated exhibitions at institutions including the Galleria Nazionale d'Arte Moderna e Contemporanea, MAXXI L'Aquila and Palazzo delle Esposizioni. In 2021, she co-curated Io dico io - I say I at the Galleria Nazionale in Rome with Lara Conte and Paola Ugolini. She curated a retrospective of Linda Fregni Nagler at GAM Torino in 2025.

With Gianni, Canziani co-founded IUNO, a research centre for contemporary art in Rome. She also co-founded Les Cerises, a publishing project devoted to artists' books for children.

Canziani was selected by the Italian Ministry of Culture to curate the Italian Pavilion at the 61st Venice Biennale in 2026. Her exhibition, Con te con tutto, presented work by Chiara Camoni in the Tese delle Vergini at the Arsenale. Canziani had previously curated Camoni's work and edited her first monograph, published by NERO in 2017.

Canziani teaches Phenomenology of Contemporary Art at the Academy of fine arts in L'Aquila and is a member of the doctoral commission at the Academy of Fine Arts in Naples.

== Selected works ==
- A Performance Cycle, Nomas Foundation and Accademia di Belle Arti di Roma (2010), co-curator
- ZegnArt public art program (2011–2014), co-curator
- Io dico io - I say I, Galleria Nazionale d'Arte Moderna e Contemporanea, Rome (2021), co-curator
- Linda Fregni Nagler retrospective, GAM Torino (2025)
- Con te con tutto, Italian Pavilion, 61st Venice Biennale (2026)
