= American Arts Conservancy =

American non-profit organization

The American Arts Conservancy (AAC) is a Tampa, Florida-based non-profit established in 2025 whose stated mission is to “identify and fund the restoration and conservation of historic American paintings, drawings and sculpture.” It is the official sponsor of the American Pavilion at the 2026 Venice Biennale.

== People ==
The executive director is Jenni Parido. The president of the board of directors is Frank Bardonaro, CEO of the Houston-based Brock Group.

Advisors include Jeffrey Uslip, an art curator; Mackenzie Brumberg; Nicola Verses; Nicole McGraw, a Palm Beach art dealer and U.S. ambassador to Croatia; artist Brendan Murphy; and artist Brandon Ralph.

== History ==
The organization became a nonprofit in June 2025. Barndonaro was named president of the AAC board of directors in late August. The initial press release repeated a quote by its Parido.
