= Andreas Angelidakis =

Greek sculptor (born 1968)

- Angelidakis at the 2026 Venice Biennale
- Born: 1968 (age 57–58); Athens, Greece
- Education: Southern California Institute of Architecture (BArch, 1992); Columbia University (master's, 1995)
- Known for: Installation art, architecture
- Notable work: Demos (2017); Escape Room (2026)
- Website: angelidakis.com

Andreas Angelidakis (born 1968) is a Greek artist and architect based in Athens. He works in installation, sculpture, architecture, writing and

exhibition design. His work has been presented at documenta 14, the Liverpool Biennial and the Chicago Architecture Biennial.

== Early life and education ==
Angelidakis was born in Athens in 1968. He studied architecture at the Southern California Institute of Architecture (SCI-Arc), receiving a Bachelor of Architecture in 1992. He later studied at Columbia University in New York, where he received a master's degree in advanced architectural design in 1995.

== Career ==
Angelidakis began using digital environments and the internet in his architectural work during the 1990s and early 2000s. Rather than concentrating on constructed buildings, he produced digital models, videos, installations and architectural proposals.

In 2014, the National Museum of Contemporary Art in Athens presented Every End is a Beginning, a survey of his work. The following year, he participated in the inaugural Chicago Architecture Biennial. For the Liverpool Biennial in 2016, he created Collider, an architectural installation inside the former Cains Brewery.

Angelidakis participated in documenta 14 in Athens and Kassel in 2017. His works included Demos, an installation made from lightweight foam modules that visitors could move and rearrange.

In 2022, Angelidakis created Center for the Critical Appreciation of Antiquity, commissioned by Audemars Piguet Contemporary and first presented at Espace Niemeyer in Paris. The installation included a reconstructed column, movable furniture, and videos based on his research into the Temple of Olympian Zeus in Athens. A version of the work was subsequently exhibited at the National Museum of Contemporary Art in Athens.

In 2026, Angelidakis represented Greece at the 61st Venice Biennale with Escape Room, curated by George Bekirakis. The installation transformed the Greek Pavilion into an escape room and incorporated architectural elements, video, lighting and inflatable sculptures.

== Selected works ==
- Hand House (2010), architectural project
- Demos (2017), installation
- Center for the Critical Appreciation of Antiquity (2022), installation
- Anarchaeological Anaparastasis (2025), installation
- Escape Room (2026), installation
