= Aline Bouvy =

Aline Bouvy (born 1974) is a Belgian-Luxembourgish contemporary visual artist who lives and works between Brussels and Luxembourg. She works in sculpture, drawing, photography, and sound, among other media disciplines. In 2026, she represented Luxembourg at the 61st Venice Biennale.

== Early life and education ==
Bouvy was born in Watermael-Boitsfort, Belgium, in 1974. She studied visual arts at the École de Recherche Graphique (ERG) in Brussels from 1995 to 1999 and subsequently attended the Jan van Eyck Academie in Maastricht.

After completing her studies, Bouvy lived in Berlin and London before returning to Brussels. She later began dividing her time between Brussels and Luxembourg.

== Career ==
From 2000 to 2013, Bouvy worked in collaboration with artist John Gillis. Their work is represented in the collection of Mudam Luxembourg. Bouvy began working independently in 2013.

Her solo exhibitions have included The Future of Not Working at CIAP in Hasselt in 2017 and PUP - The Cabaret Version, developed during a residency at Künstlerhaus Bethanien in Berlin in 2019 and later shown at IKOB Museum of Contemporary Art in Eupen in 2020. In 2022, the Musée des Arts Contemporains in Grand-Hornu presented Cruising Bye, her largest solo exhibition to that date.

In 2025, Casino Luxembourg presented Hot Flashes, a solo exhibition that included sculpture, installation and video. The exhibition preceded Bouvy's selection to represent Luxembourg at the Venice Biennale.

Bouvy represented Luxembourg at the 61st Venice Biennale in 2026 with La Merde, curated by Stilbé Schroeder. The installation included E.T. The Excremential (2025), a life-size sculpture combining the figure of E.T. with Bouvy's own body, and La Merde (2026), her first film.

== Selected exhibitions ==
- The Future of Not Working, CIAP, Hasselt (2017)
- PUP – The Cabaret Version, Künstlerhaus Bethanien, Berlin (2019); IKOB, Eupen (2020)
- Cruising Bye, MACS, Grand-Hornu (2022)
- Hot Flashes, Casino Luxembourg (2025)
- La Merde, Luxembourg Pavilion, 61st Venice Biennale (2026)
