= Ese Onojeruo =

British curator and film producer

Ese Onojeruo is a British curator and film producer based in London. She has worked at the Tate as Assistant Curator of the Young People’s Programme, as well as the Chisenhale Gallery and South London Gallery. She has also produced films and moving-image projects with contemporary artists. In 2026, she curated Lubaina Himid's exhibition Predicting History: Testing Translation for the British Pavilion at the 61st Venice Biennale.

== Career ==
Onojeruo worked with the South London Gallery's Narration Group, a collective of women and non-binary people of colour. She also developed Curating Black Art, a course with Black Blossoms School of Art.

She later worked as a studio associate for artist Anthea Hamilton. In that role, Onojeruo produced primetime (2022), a 24-hour video commissioned by the Hayward Gallery for its outdoor screen at London's Southbank Centre. She also worked on The Only Good System is a Sound System (2021) by Black Obsidian Sound System, which was presented as part of the collective's Turner Prize nomination.

Onojeruo subsequently became Assistant Curator of Young People's Programmes at Tate. Her work there included programming the evening series Late at Tate Britain and Creative Space, a year-long project developed during Lubaina Himid's 2021–2022 exhibition at Tate Modern.

As a film producer, Onojeruo has worked on projects by Evan Ifekoya, Shamica Ruddock, Arwa Aburawa and Turab Shah. She produced Ifekoya's short documentary Modupe, which received support from the BFI Doc Society Made of Truth Fund.

In October 2025, the British Council appointed Onojeruo as Shane Akeroyd Associate Curator for its 2026 Venice Biennale commission. She curated Himid's Predicting History: Testing Translation for the British Pavilion, comprising new multi-panel paintings and a soundscape by Magda Stawarska. The exhibition opened in May 2026.

== Selected projects ==
- Narration Group, South London Gallery
- The Only Good System is a Sound System, Black Obsidian Sound System (2021), production
- primetime, Anthea Hamilton (2022), production
- Creative Space, Tate Modern, curatorial program
- Modupe, Evan Ifekoya, film production
- Predicting History: Testing Translation, British Pavilion, Venice Biennale (2026), curator
