= Ei Arakawa-Nash =

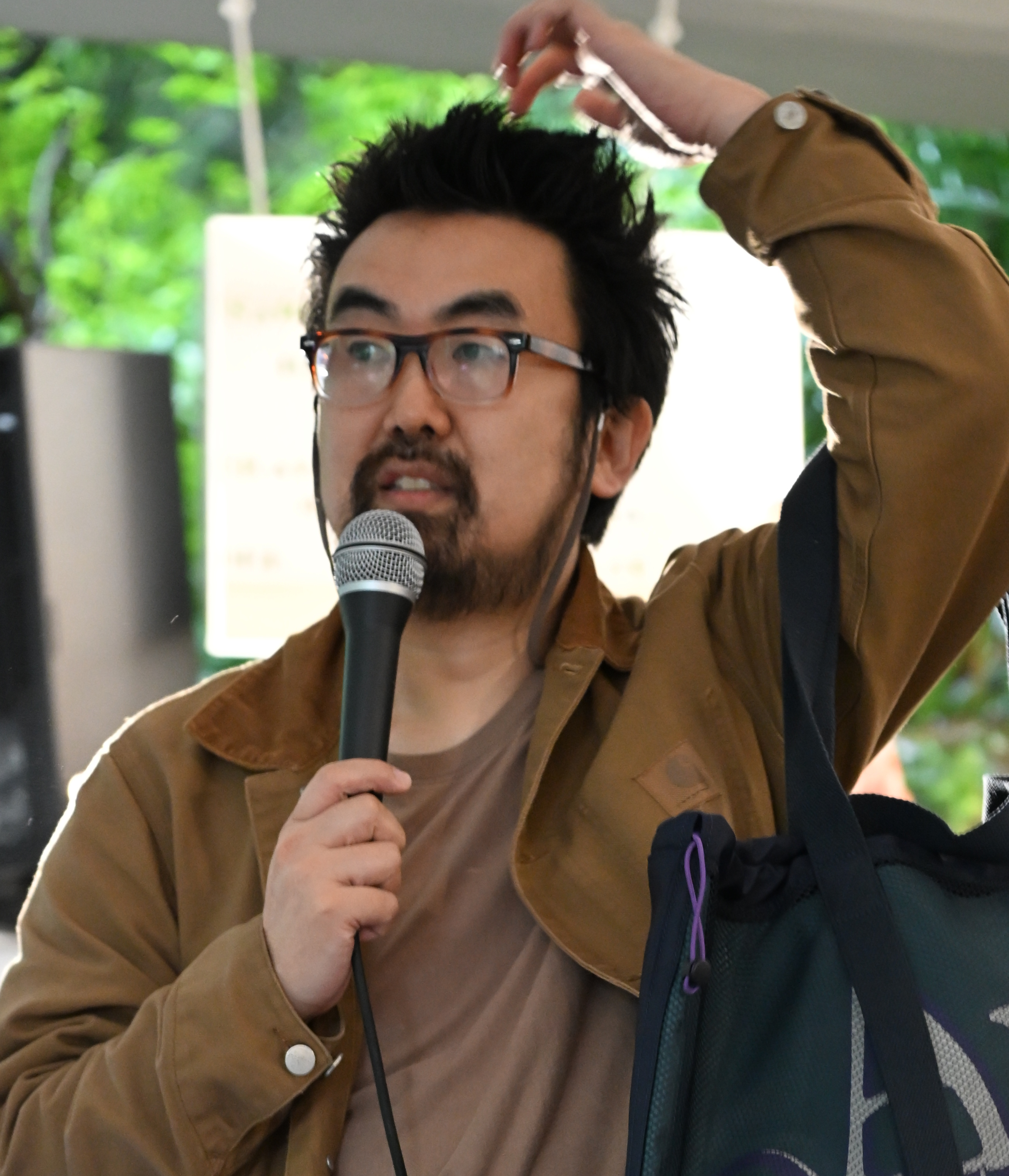
- Arakawa-Nash at the 2026 Venice Biennale
- Born: Fukushima, Japan
- Notable work: Mid-Yuming as Reconstruction Mood, Paintings Are Popstars, Grass Babies, Moon Babies

Ei Arakawa-Nash is a Japanese-American artist known for humorous and playful research-based collaborative performance works. Arakawa-Nash represented Japan at the 2026 Venice Biennale.

== Career ==
In 2004, Arakawa-Nash staged their performance of Mid-Yuming as Reconstruction Mood at New York's Reena Spaulings Fine Art. Their first solo museum-exhibition was Paintings Are Popstars held at Tokyo's National Art Center in 2024. They are is a faculty member of ArtCenter College of Design’s graduate art program, in Pasadena, California, a position which he started in 2022.

== 2026 Venice Biennale ==
His solo exhibition Grass Babies, Moon Babies consists of two hundred baby dolls which weigh approximately the same as four-month old babies, each wearing reflective sunglasses.

He selected 57 dates to serve as the birthdates of the dolls. The dates relate to the history of nationalism, wars, as well as women's reproductive rights, queer history and labour politics in Japan. The dates are drawn from Europe, the United States and across Asia, including Southeast Asia.

The pavilion also features contributions from artists Jae-eun Choi, composer Sergei Tcherepnin, art collective FAC XTRA RETREAT, astrologer Yukari Ishii, tea master Reijiro Izumi, illustrator R. Kikuo Johnson and Goen Choi. There is a significant dimension of collaboration with the neighboring South Korea Pavilion.

== Personal life ==
Arakawa-Nash was born in Fukushima, Japan. He was naturalized as an American citizen in 2019 giving up his Japanese citizenship.

Along with his husband, Arakawa-Nash is a parent to twins.
