= Miet Warlop =

Belgian visual and performance artist (born 1978)

- Born: 1978 (age 47–48); Torhout, Belgium
- Education: Royal Academy of Fine Arts
- Occupations: Visual and performance artist

Miet Warlop (born 1978) is a Belgian visual and performance artist. Born in Torhout, Belgium, she lives and works between Ghent and Brussels. She works across theatre, installation, sculpture and live performance. In 2026, she represented Belgium at the 61st Venice Biennale.

== Early life and education ==
Warlop was born in Torhout in 1978. She studied three-dimensional art at the Royal Academy of Fine Arts (KASK) in Ghent, graduating with a master's degree in visual arts in 2003.

Her graduation project, Huilend Hert, Aangeschoten Wild, included six different tableaux vivants and a crawling performer. The work received the KASK Franciscus Pycke Jury Prize in 2003 and a young theatre award at Theater Aan Zee in Ostend in 2004.

== Career ==
In 2005, Warlop presented Sportband, Afgetrainde Klanken, a performance concert combining music and athleticism. From 2006 to 2007, she participated in DE BANK, an artist-development programme at CAMPO in Ghent. Her production Springville premiered in 2009.

Warlop presented Mystery Magnet at Kunstenfestivaldesarts in Brussels in 2012. The performance included oversized costumes, moving objects and custom staged visual effects. The performance received the Stückemarkt Prize at the Berliner Theatertreffen in 2014.

Her solo performance Dragging the Bone premiered in 2014. In 2015, KIOSK in Ghent presented Crumbling Down the Circle of My Iconoclasm, a solo exhibition of objects, with a live performance in the middle of the act. She later created Fruits of Labor (2016), which combined live music and choreography. In 2017, HAU Hebbel am Ufer in Berlin presented a retrospective featuring Mystery Magnet, Dragging the Bone and Fruits of Labor.

In 2021, she premiered After All Springville, a new version of her 2009 production. The following year, Warlop directed ONE SONG: Histoire(s) du Théâtre IV, commissioned by NTGent and premiering at the Festival d'Avignon. The performance featured musicians playing a composition by Maarten van Cauwenberghe repeatedly while also performing physical exercises onstage. It received the VSCD Mime and Performance Prize in 2023.

In 2025, Warlop premiered INHALE DELIRIUM EXHALE, a production presented by Kunstenfestivaldesarts, Kaaitheater and Les Halles de Schaerbeek in Brussels.

She represented Belgium at the 61st Venice Biennale in 2026 with IT NEVER SSST, curated by Caroline Dumalin. The installation took place at the Belgian Pavilion in the Giardini and included plaster words, musicians and dancers. Performers carried, rearranged and broke the plaster objects during scheduled performances.

== Selected works ==
- Huilend Hert, Aangeschoten Wild (2003–2004)
- Sportband, Afgetrainde Klanken (2005)
- Springville (2009)
- Mystery Magnet (2012)
- Fruits of Labor (2016)
- After All Springville (2021)
- ONE SONG: Histoire(s) du Théâtre IV (2022)
- INHALE DELIRIUM EXHALE (2025)
- IT NEVER SSST (2026)
