= Jenni Parido =

American non-profit executive

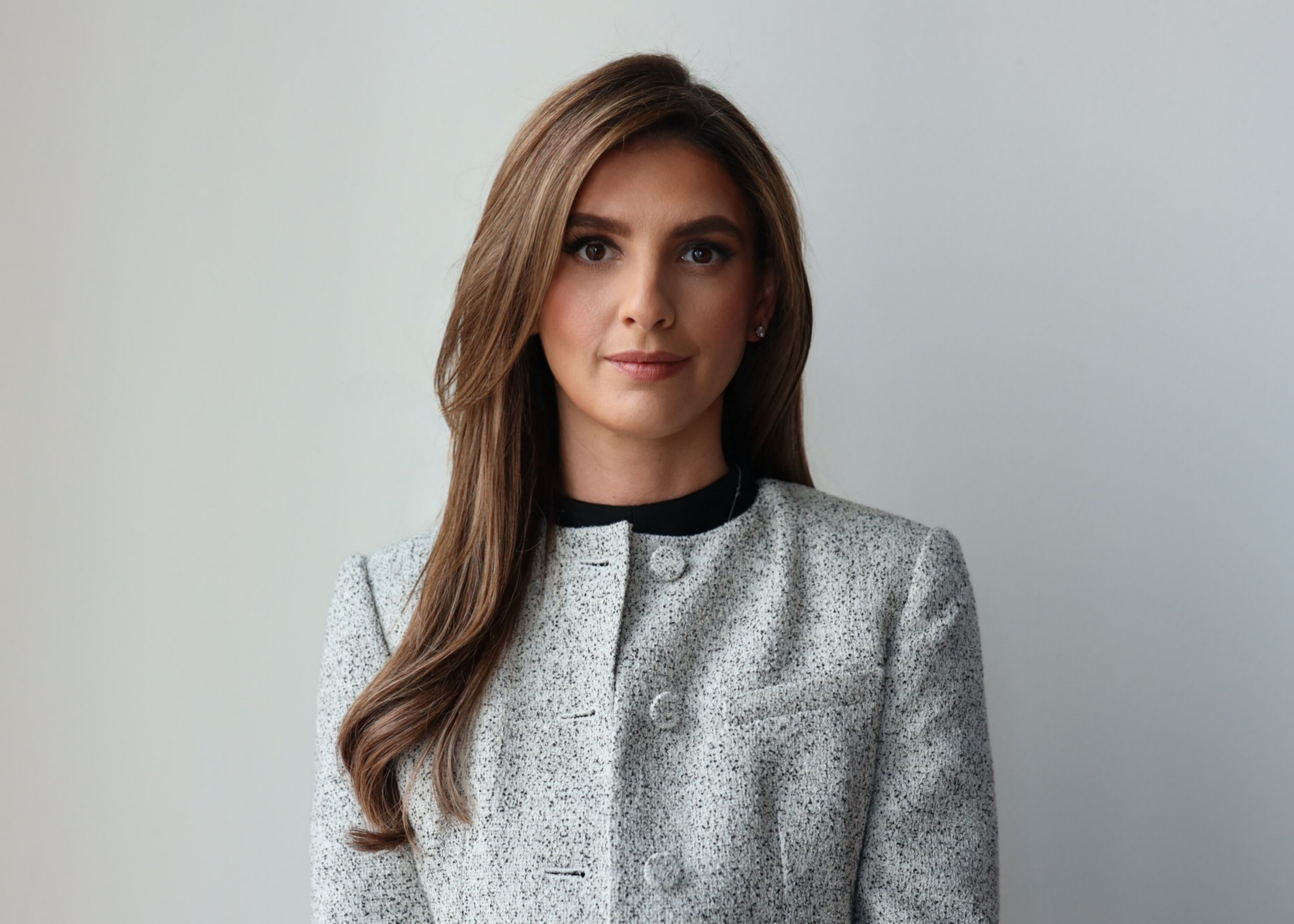
- Parido in 2026
- Education: University of Tampa
- Occupation: Nonprofit executive
- Employer: American Arts Conservancy
- Known for: Commissioner of the American Pavilion at the 2026 Venice Biennale, co-founder of Feed Pet Purveyor

Jenni Parido is the commissioner of the American Pavilion at the 2026 Venice Biennale and the executive director of the American Arts Conservancy.

== Career ==
Parido studied graphic design at the University of Tampa.

From 2014 to 2023, Parido operated a Tampa-based boutique pet store called Feed Pet Purveyor, which was described online as “a healthy lifestyle market for pets and their people.”

Prior to her appointment as the commissioner, she was largely unknown in the art world. When asked by CNN about her previous arts experience, Parido pointed to her interest in the arts since college.

== American Arts Conservancy ==
Parido founded the American Arts Conservancy, which became a non-profit in June 2025, which described its mission is to “identify and fund the restoration and conservation of historic American paintings, drawings and sculpture.”
