= Tori Wrånes =

Norwegian artist

Tori Wrånes (born 19 March 1978, Kristiansand, Norway) is a Norwegian conceptual artist and vocalist.

== Career ==
Based in Oslo, she is internationally recognized for her dynamic performances and installations. Wrånes has presented solo exhibitions and commissions at institutions including the Helsinki Art Museum (HAM), Kunsthal Charlottenborg, and the Ujazdowski Castle Center for Contemporary Art in Warsaw. She has participated in major international exhibitions and biennials such as Performa 13 (New York), the Sydney Biennale, and the Bangkok Art Biennale. In 2026, she represented Norway at the Nordic pavilion of the Venice Biennale alongside Klara Kristalova and Benjamin Orlow.
