= Faig Ahmed =

Azerbaijani artist (born 1982)

- Faiq Əhməd
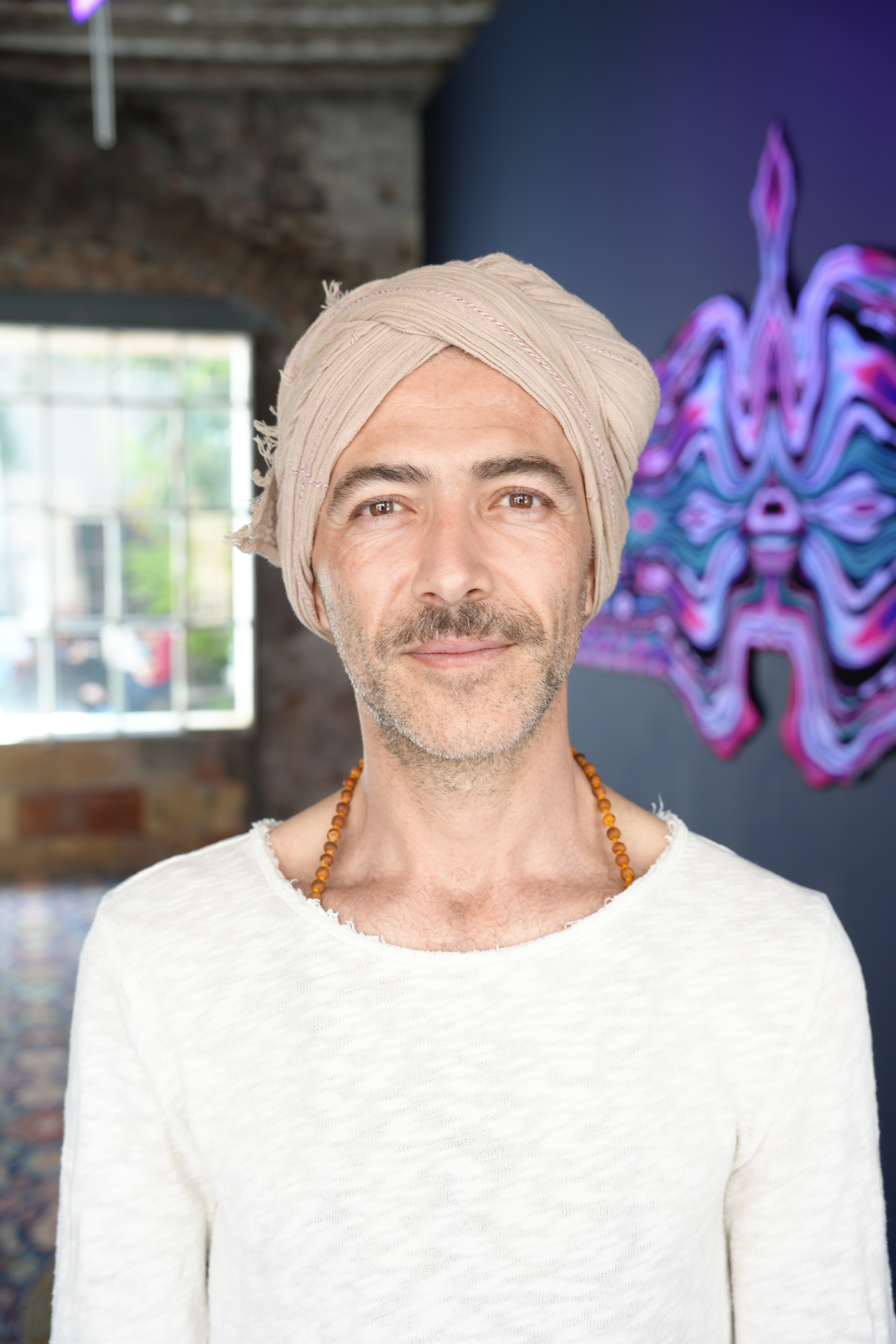
- Ahmed at 2026 Venice Biennale
- Born: 1982 (age 43–44); Sumqayit, Azerbaijan
- Occupation: Visual artist
- Website: https://faigahmed.com/

Faig Ahmed (Azerbaijani: Faiq Əhməd) (born 1982 in Sumqayit, Azerbaijan) is an Azerbaijani contemporary visual artist who is best known for his surrealist weavings, which integrate visual distortions into traditional oriental rugs.

Ahmed graduated from the sculpture program at the Azerbaijan State Academy of Fine Arts in Baku in 2004. In 2007, Ahmed's work was included in Azerbaijan's first pavilion in the Venice Biennalle in 2013 he participated in the show “Love Me, Love Me Not” and the 11th Mercosul Visual Arts Biennial in 2018.

While Ahmed has created artworks in multiple media, including sculpture, video, and installation, he is best known for his surrealist sculptural textiles, which apply optical illusions in the form of often psychedelic visual manipulations (including warping, glitching, melting, pixelating, and unraveling) to traditional Islamic rugs. The textiles are manufactured by a group of skilled weavers who follow Ahmed's designs paying strict attention to traditional Azerbaijani weaving techniques.

== Exhibitions ==
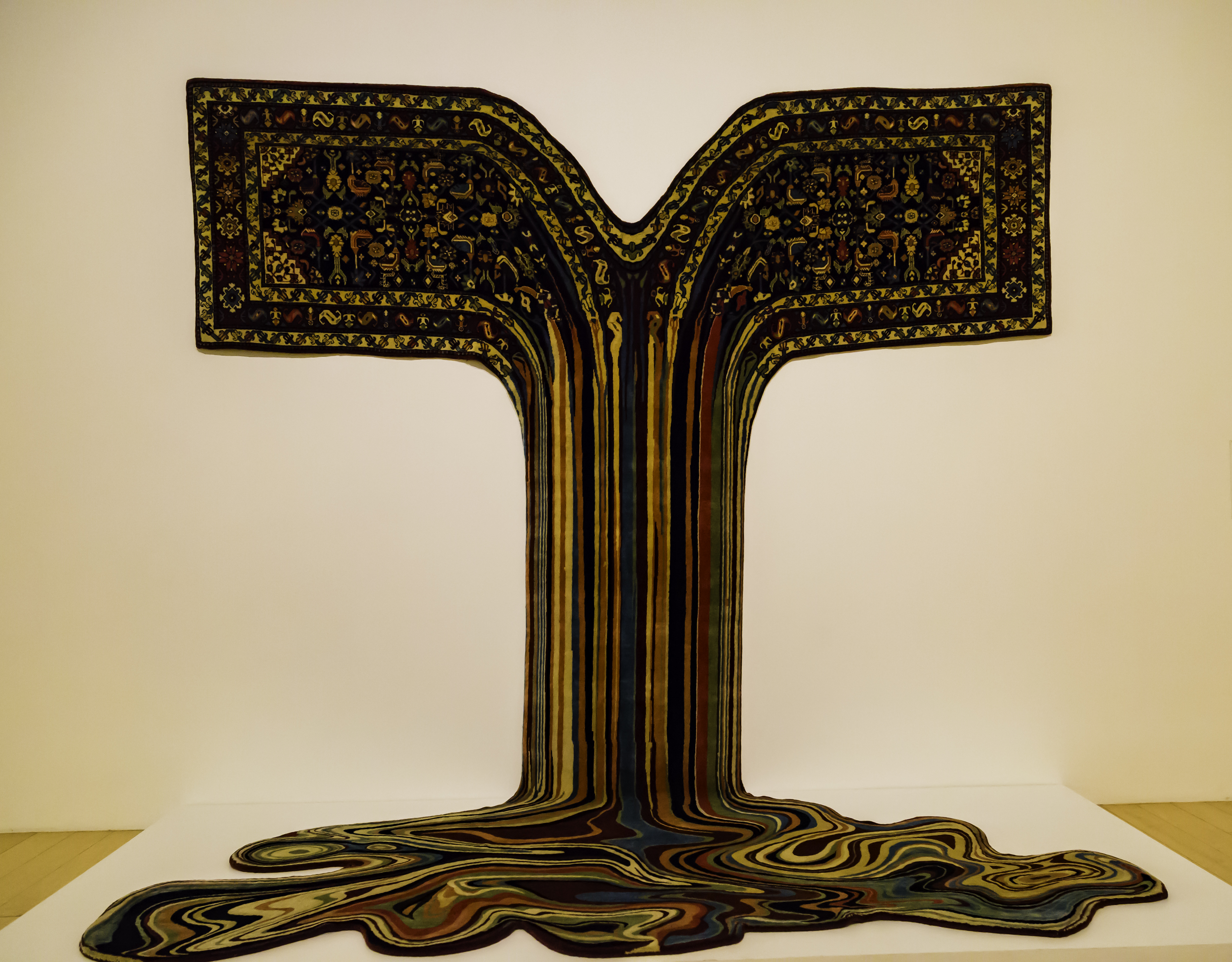
Faig Ahmed's "Osho" displayed at LACMA

Ahmed has exhibited his works worldwide, including group and solo exhibitions in New York, Paris, London, Berlin, Moscow, Dubai, Sharjah, Mumbai, Rome, Venice, Washington D.C., Hong Kong, Mumbai, Moscow, Azerbaijan, Sweden, Norway, Honolulu, Melbourne, and Sydney.

In the past few years, Ahmed's works have been exhibited in several museums, including the Museum of Fine Art Boston, Los Angeles County Museum, Bellevue Art Museum, Milwaukee Institute of Art & Design, MOCA Cleveland, Museum of Old and New Art, Tasmania, the Museum of Contemporary Art of Rome (MACRO), Pennsylvania College of Art and Design, Shangri La Museum of Islamic Art, NYU Abu Dhabi, the Textile Museum of Sweden, the Projective Eye Gallery at UNC Charlotte, New Tretyakov Gallery, Istanbul Modern, and others.

Additionally, in 2013, he was nominated for the Jameel Prize 3 at the Victoria and Albert Museum in London.

== Collections ==
Ahmed's rug sculptures are held in notable public collections, including the Los Angeles County Museum of Art, Seattle Art Museum, RISD Museum, Art Institute of Chicago, Seattle Art Museum, Palm Springs Museum of Art, Chrysler Museum of Art, Currier Museum of Art, Rhode Island School of Design Museum (RISD), Wake Forest University Museum, George Washington University, Brooks Museum of Art, Currier Museum of Art, Museum of Fine Arts, de Young Museum; Bargoin Museum, France; MOCAK Museum of Contemporary Art, Poland; The National Gallery of Victoria, Australia; Arsenal art contemporain Montréal, Canada; The National Museum of Art, Architecture and Design, Norway; Istanbul Modern, Turkey; Maraya Art Centre, UAE.

His works have also been placed in private collections such as the West Collection, Philadelphia; the collection of Beth Rudin DeWoody, New York City; Galila Barzilaï-Hollander's collection, Brussels, Espacio SOLO, Puerta de Alcalá, Madrid; and the private collection of Sheikh Zayed bin Sultan bin Khalifa al-Nahyan, United Arab Emirates among others.
