= John Beadle =

English clergyman and writer

John Beadle (died 1667), was an English clergyman, known as a diarist.

== Life ==
Beadle matriculated at Pembroke College, Cambridge on 8 July 1613, and graduated BA in 1617. He was first rector of Little Leighs, in which capacity he signed a petition to Laud in favour of Thomas Hooker, afterwards a famous New England divine. He was presented by Laud to the rectory of Barnstone in May 1632, at the recommendation of Samuel Collins, who describes him as 'a young man' of a 'conformable way.' In Laud's account of his ' Province for 1633'there occurs the following entry: 'I did likewise convent Mr. John Beedle, rector of Barnstone in Essex, for omitting some part of the divine service and refusing conformity. But upon his submission and promise of reformation, I dismissed him with a canonical admonition.' Later, in 1638, another entry shows that Laud had an eye upon him.

Beadle was one of the 'classis' for the county of Essex. He was also one of the signatories to the historical' Essex Testimony.' In 1650, he is returned as 'an able preacher.' When the Act of Uniformity was passed in 1662, he elected to remain in his rectory. He died in 1667. The following entry is in the parish register: 'Beginning at the east end and north side lye interred the body of Mr. John Bedle 30 years rector of the parish, buried 11 May 1667.' His widow survived him many years, being buried 14 July 1676. There are entries of seven children of theirs baptised between 1632 and 1646.

== Works ==
He was the author of the Journal or Diary of a Thankful Christian. Presented in some Meditations upon Numbers xxxiii. 2. By John Beadle, Master of Arts, and Minister of the Gospel at Barnstone in Essex, 1656.' In Arthur Wilson's 'Autobiography' there is this entry under 21 July 1644: 'Mr. Beedle, of Barnstone, preached at Leez [Leighs]. His text was Numbers xxxiii. 2, insisting upon this, that every Christian ought to keep a record of his own actions and ways. This made me run back to the beginning of my life, assisted by my memories and some small notes, wherein I have given a true, though a meane, delineation of eight and forty years progress in the world.' On 25 April 1656, he published his 'Journal or Diary' dedicated to Robert Rich, 2nd Earl of Warwick, and to the countess.
