= Dana Awartani =

Palestinian-Saudi artist

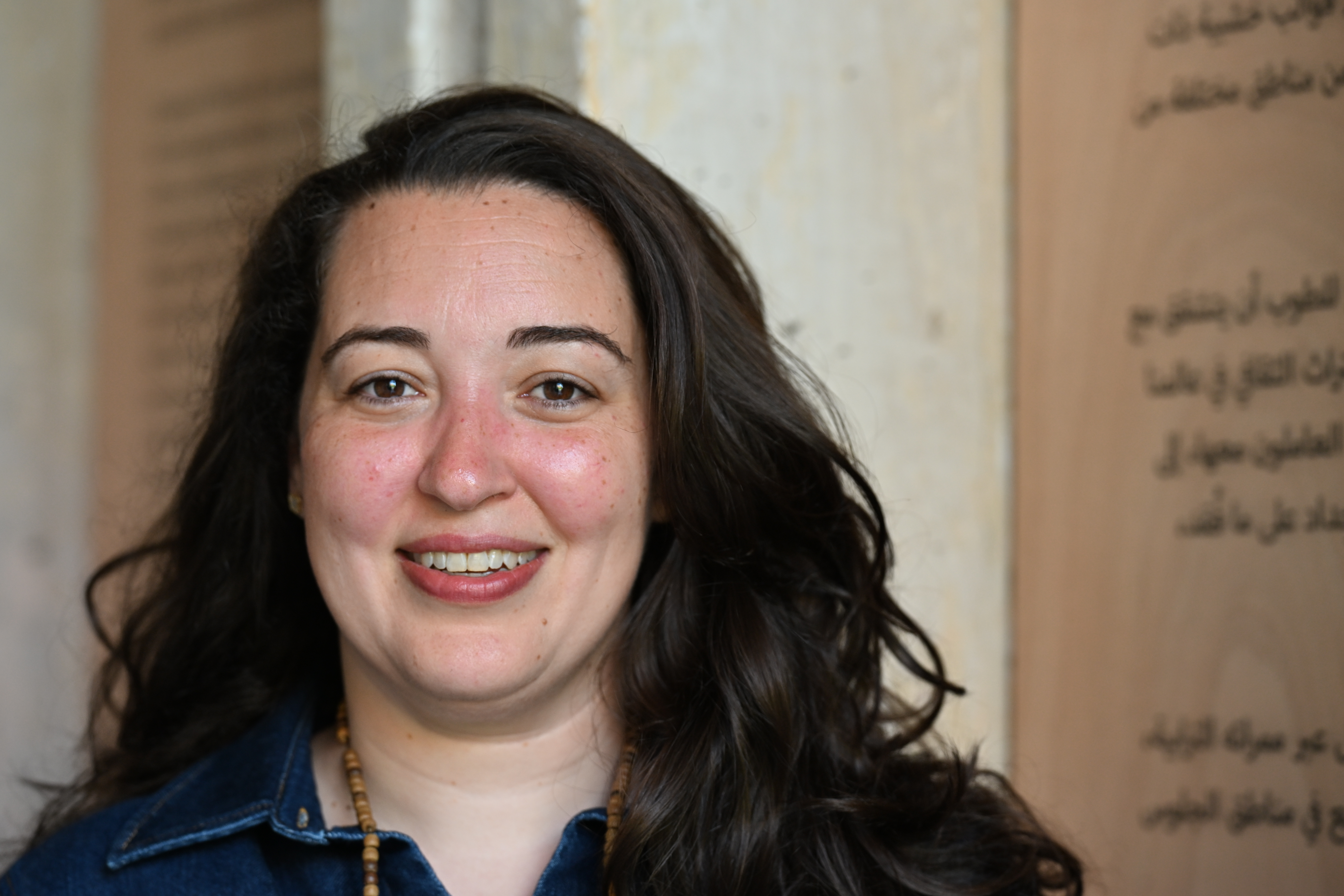
- Dana Awartani (2026)
- Born: 1987 (age 38–39)
- Website: https://danaawartani.com/

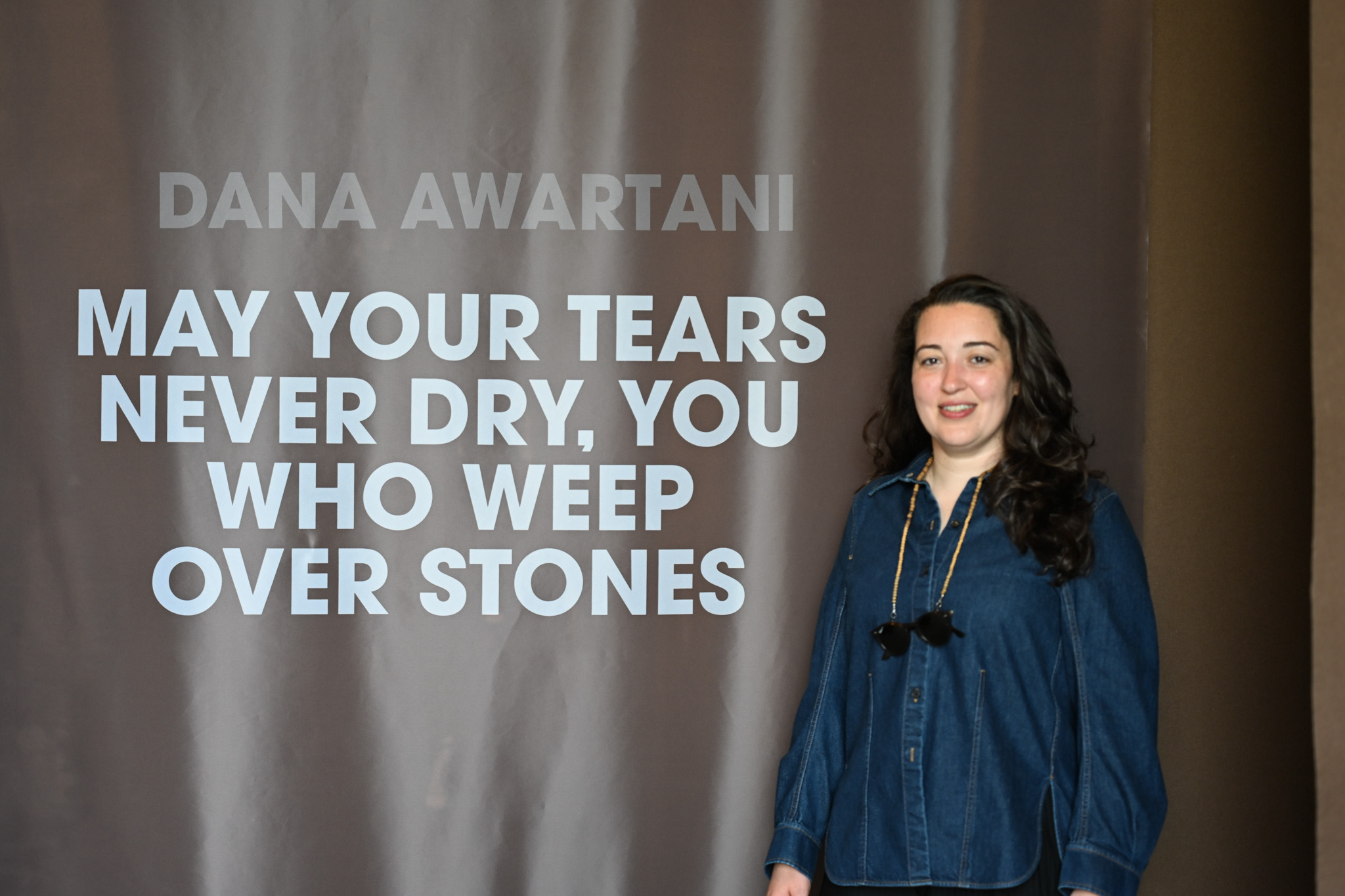
Dana Awartani at the Biennale di Venezia 2026

Dana Awartani (Arabic: دانا عورتاني; born 1987) is a Saudi visual artist, of Palestinian ethnicity. She works in various mediums including painting, video art, and sand mosaic; and incorporates traditional methods of Islamic art. Awartani was born and raised in Jeddah, Saudi Arabia where she lives today.

== Education ==
Awartani received a Foundation Degree (2006) in Art and Design from the Byam Shaw School of Art. Then graduated with a bachelor's degree (2009) in fine art from Central Saint Martins, London. She then received a master's degree (2011) in traditional arts from The Prince's School, London. At The Prince’s School she learned how to work in stained glass, miniature painting, and gilding; various traditional techniques from cultures all over the world. However, she couldn’t gain a degree in the traditional illumination of texts there, so she found an instructor in Turkey to help her to master this discipline.

== Work ==
Awartani employs a variety of media in her work, including painting, video and sand mosaics. Her work is unique in that it seeks to incorporate the traditional methods of Islamic art into a contemporary world. Rich in geometric patterning and the most intricate of details, Dana’s work often integrates the patterning styles of Islamic art. Specialising in geometry as well as illumination, tile-work and parquetry, Awartani's work explores the relationship between geometry and nature, as well as how truths can be translated through art using geometric principles, visualising a sacred language through a symbolic and multi-layered aesthetic. Her method that emerged over 1,000 years ago as a substitute for the forbidden depiction of divine figures. It is still being practiced, although less and less, today, by specialists such as Dana.

On Arabs and art Dana said: ″As Arabs we’re raised around this fine art, we’re surrounded by it in every corner but we’re not aware of it. You can see geometry all around you like in mosques for example. I was looking for a track to follow and looking deep down inside I felt a yearning for it until I’ve discovered it. There is an inner and outer beauty behind it telling a story behind every structured piece, there is no randomness when it comes to creating such pieces.″ On the Islamic art, she said: ″Islamic Art is firstly not made for the sake of making art. It is a sacred spiritual practice that is used as a way to worship God and for God. It teaches one sabr (patience) and respect and as an Islamic artist, my work is a form of prayer and dhikr (remembrance). I need to be 100% focused and in a good mood to be able to do it, otherwise it doesn’t work."

Awartani was included in the Rhizoma project of the 55th Venice Biennale in 2013. Her work is in the collection of the Hirshhorn Museum and Sculpture Garden, Washington D.C. and the British Museum, London.
