= Patrizio di Massimo =

Contemporary artist biography

- Born: 1983 (age 42–43)
- Education: Brera Academy, Slade School of Fine Art, De Ateliers
- Style: Painting

Patrizio di Massimo (born 1983, Jesi, Italy) is a contemporary artist based in London. He is recognised for his self-portraits and paintings depicting family and friends.

== Early life and education ==
Di Massimo was born in Jesi, in the Italian region of Marche. He received his bachelor’s degree from the Brera Academy in Milan and later graduated from the Slade School of Fine Art in London.

== Work ==
Di Massimo's work is influenced by early 20th-century art movements, particularly the Italian Return to Order and the German New Objectivity. His portraiture explores themes of power, seduction, consensus, and co-optation. His subjects include self-portraits where he appears in various disguises, as well as portraits of family and friends depicted in intimate, theatrical scenes. His work has been noted for its engagement with masculinity and queerness, often incorporating erotic undertones that challenge conventional representations of the male body and the male gaze.

Di Massimo employs the glazing technique. Before focusing exclusively on painting, he experimented with performance art, video, and installation. Between 2012 and 2015, his work incorporated decorative elements such as cushions, tassels, curtains, and trimmings.

== Exhibitions ==
Di Massimo has held solo exhibitions at institutions including Castello di Rivoli, Rivoli-Turin (2021), Kunsthalle Lissabon, Lisbon (2014), Gasworks, London (2013), Stedelijk Museum, Amsterdam (2012), and Whitechapel Art Gallery (2009), London (2009). Writing for Artforum, Pier Paolo Pancotto described his 2014 solo show "Are Ere Ire" as "an astonishing anthology of visual and intellectual interpretations of [identity and the continuous mutation to which it can be subjected]."

His work has also been featured in group exhibitions at Hangar Bicocca, Milan (2017), Fiorucci Art Trust, London (2015), Triennale di Milano, Milan (2015), Fondazione Sandretto Re Rebaudengo, Turin (2013), MAXXI, Rome (2012). He was one of eight artists featured in I'm Here But You're Gone, a scent-based art exhibition at the Fiorucci Art Trust.

From 25 February 2026 - 12 April 2026, the Estorick Collection of Modern Italian Art exhibited Patrizio di Massimo: Between Us. The exhibit featured works created from 2020 to 2026 and was co-organised with the Consulate General of Italy.
