= Pierre Leguillon =

French conceptual artist

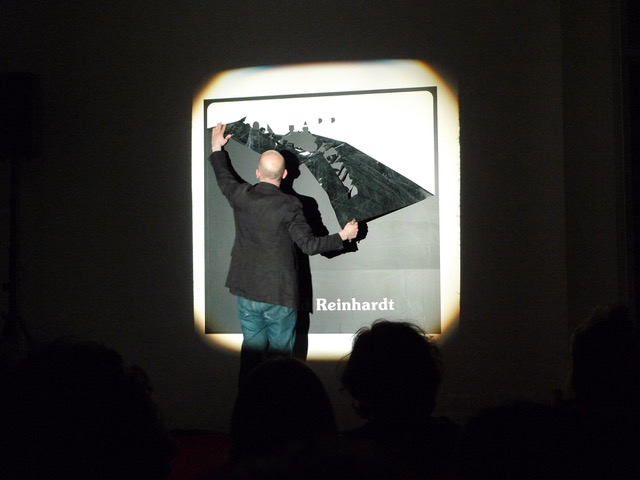
- Performance by Pierre Leguillon in Paris (2011).
- Born: 23 May 1969; Nogent-sur-Marne, France
- Known for: Installation, video, artist museum
- Notable work: Diaporama (1993–2006), The Promise of the Screen (2007–), Diane Arbus (2008), The Great Escape (2011), The Museum of Mistakes (2013–)
- Movement: Conceptual art
- Awards: Bob Calle Prize (2021)

Pierre Leguillon (born 23 May 1969) is a French conceptual artist living in Brussels, Belgium. His multidisciplinary practice centers on the circulation, reproduction, and contextual framing of images, often through unconventional formats such as slide lectures, artist's books, and curated collections of ephemera.

A former art critic and editor, Leguillon has exhibited internationally and taught at HEAD-Genève. He is known for La promesse de l'écran ('The Promise of the Screen'), an ongoing film-screening project, and for founding The Museum of Mistakes, an independent, anti-hierarchical institution devoted to the overlooked and the incidental in art. His artist books, including Ads. and Oracles, combine design, archival material, and typographic experimentation. In 2021, he was awarded the Bob Calle Prize for the Artist's Book.

== Biography ==
Pierre Leguillon was born on 23 May 1969 in Nogent-sur-Marne, France. He studied visual arts at the University of Paris 1 Panthéon-Sorbonne from 1989 to 1992. In 1991, then a student, Pierre Leguillon launched the single-page magazine Sommaire. In the early 1990s, he began his career as an art critic and editor, writing for Art Press, Le Journal des Arts, and Purple. In 1992, he organised the exhibition Des hauts et des bas in Paris in a small maid's room. The following year, he photographed Hans Ulrich Obrist's exhibition Hôtel Carlton Palace Chambre 763.

With his first slide show in 1993, Leguillon described his visits to exhibitions using carefully framed, medium-format (4.5 x 6 cm) slides, supplemented by photos from publications. By 1999, he had removed spoken commentary entirely, focusing solely on the manipulation of images and sounds, adjusting each presentation with props, voice-overs, and positioning of the screen. Until 2006, he identified as a diaporamist or "slide artist".

In 2001, he edited the publication accompanying Raymond Hains' retrospective at the Centre Pompidou. Known for his wordplay, Hains influenced Leguillon's Museum of Mistakes, founded in Brussels in 2013, a collection that challenges traditional museum hierarchies and art-historical structures. The exhibition was launched at WIELS Contemporary Art Centre in Brussels in January 2015, where he cultivated a playful approach to art and curation.

In 2003, he was a resident at the French Academy in Rome (Villa Medici). In 2010, he became a lecturer at HEAD-Genève in Switzerland.

In 2021, Leguillon was awarded the Bob Calle Prize for the Artist's Book for Ads., published by Triangle Books in Brussels. The book compiles 70 pages of advertisements featuring artists endorsing commercial brands, which forms part of his Museum of Mistakes collection.

== Works ==
Leguillon's work is deeply connected to photography and the accumulation of images. He often collects, classifies, and arranges images in various configurations, challenging traditional notions of artistic hierarchy and linearity. His early work involved photographing shop window displays, which he equated with the concept of a vitrine—a glass display case that, much like a camera, captures and frames its subject. One of his early works, created in 1989 in Prague, depicted an uninhabited vivarium, emphasising the absence of its subject.

His 2008 exhibition Diane Arbus: A Printed Retrospective 1960–1971 at Kadist Art Foundation in Paris examined Diane Arbus's editorial photography by presenting the original magazine pages behind glass, challenging notions of authenticity and aura. Similarly, his 2013 project Dubuffet Typographer showcased samples of Jean Dubuffet's handwriting as geological strata, disrupting conventional museum displays.

According to Jenelle Porter, Leguillon resists the traditional white-cube gallery model, often presenting his works in unconventional formats. His Prelinger Drawings (2011/15) utilised framed frottages within a free-hanging textile structure, inspired by the geospatial taxonomy of the Prelinger Library in San Francisco. Another major work, The Great Escape (2012), involved a multimedia performance featuring dance imagery and music by Amy Winehouse, creating a dynamic interplay between images and movement.

=== Diaporama (Slideshow) ===
For approximately 15 years, Leguillon employed the slide-lecture format as a poetic and performative means of exploring images. In 1993, he premiered his lecture-performance series Diaporama, in which he presented photographic slides of exhibitions, books, artworks, and performances. Over time, he refined this approach, incorporating sound and textual fragments to transform Diaporama into an autonomous art form. One notable evolution of this work was Diaporama/Vestiaire (2006), screened at Louvre in Paris (2009), an interactive event in which attendees' coats were incorporated into the performance, creating a visual and conceptual interplay between audience and screen.

=== The Promise of the Screen ===
In 2007, Leguillon initiated La promesse de l'écran ('The Promise of the Screen'), a project that began as a speakeasy in Paris featuring a flip-up film screen that concealed a bar. The project expanded into an ongoing series of screenings featuring unconventional and marginal films, often structured as thematic montages or guest presentations. This work exemplifies Leguillon's engagement with paratexts—the contextual elements surrounding artworks, such as invitations, transport crates, and exhibition materials.

Inspired by Gilles Deleuze's notion that cinema "surrounds images with a world", Leguillon manipulates screening formats to explore how context shapes perception. The project traveled across Europe, adopting a 4:3 screen set before a wine bar, ensuring an interactive and captive audience. Leguillon prioritises site-specificity, preferring marginal contexts over institutional settings. Notable iterations included projections of Josef Albers' Homage to the Square alongside LP covers he designed and John Baldessari's Six Colourful Inside Jobs (1971), emphasising projection's materiality. Later versions featured sculptural elements, such as Cécile Bart's translucent canvases, which refracted projected images to reinforce Deleuze's concept of the image as both actual and virtual. Among several venues, the project was presented at Centre Pompidou, Paris (2009), Palais de Chaillot, Paris (2011), and CIVA, Brussels (2021).

=== The Museum of Mistakes ===
In 2013, Leguillon established The Museum of Mistakes in Brussels, an institution dedicated to challenging art-historical norms and dismantling traditional museological structures. A collection of seemingly disparate ephemera, including postcards, posters, magazines, and everyday objects, stored in his kitchen cabinet, the museum deconstructs the idea of modernist progression and includes a shop and a rotating set of guides, reinforcing its anti-market stance.

His 2019 exhibition Learning from Looking at the Fondation Pernod Ricard in Paris featured a work created with Kyozo Shimogawa, a Japanese master of the Kasuri weaving technique, Merida, a painting sold by the meter. It employs natural fibers and pigments while incorporating Jacquard looms motorized by Toyota, and adapted to the dimensions of kimono fabric strips. Through this collaboration, Leguillon continues to explore the intersections of tradition and modernity, as well as the transmission of artistic techniques across cultures.

In 2025, Leguillon presented Erratum Musical at the Manoir de la Ville de Martigny, a museum-like exhibition exploring art and music through the concept of error.

=== Artist's books ===
Pierre Leguillon has produced several artist books, which he treats as autonomous artworks rather than simple mediums. He maintains control over all aspects of their design and production, often collaborating with graphic designers to create coherent, materially rich objects. Notable examples include The Museum of Mistakes (2020), conceived as a portable, ideal museum, and Ads., which received the 2021 Bob Calle Prize for the Artist's Book. His work emphasizes the book as a space of freedom, intimacy, and interaction, inspired by conceptual art and figures like Bruno Munari.

Dubuffet Typographer (2013) is a typographic anti-manual based on Jean Dubuffet's ephemera. Through fictive categories and visual analysis, Leguillon reveals how Dubuffet subverted conventional layout and typographic norms.

Oracles, published in 2017, features 123 facsimile calling cards from artists and cultural figures, spanning the 18th century to today. Combining archival material with essays, it offers a microhistorical view of art through personal networks and graphic identity, forming what he calls a "pocket museum".

La légende punaisée dans le ciel (2021) is a hybrid publication translating a slide projection into book form. Conceived at the Villa Medici in 2003–2004 and realized 17 years later, it combines a facsimile manuscript with a printed manual, using repurposed materials and mixed printing techniques to explore alternative publishing models.

== Exhibitions ==
Leguillon's work has been exhibited at the Louvre, Paris (2009); MAMCO, Geneva (2010); Moderna Museet, Malmö (2010); WIELS, Brussels (2015); and Frye Art Museum, Seattle (2019).

He has participated in several international biennials, including the Tirana International Contemporary Art Biennial, the Taipei Biennial, and the Carnegie International.

== Lectures and performances ==
Leguillon has given lectures/performances at Kadist (2011), Raven Row (2011), Dia Art Foundation (2015), École Nationale Supérieure de la Photographie (2021), Columbia University (2023).

== Published books ==
- Tifaifai. Berlin/Mexico: Bom Dia. 2013. ISBN 978-3-943514-15-5.
- Dubuffet Typographer. Brussels: (SIC). 2013. ISBN 978-2-490077-63-2.
- Le Tapis. Amsterdam: ROMA. 2015. ISBN 978-9491843273.
- Oracles: Artists' Calling Cards. Zurich: Edition Patrick Frey. 2017. ISBN 978-3-906803-16-6.
- Ads. Brussels: Triangle Books. 2019. ISBN 978-2-930777-32-0.
- The Museum of Mistakes. Zurich: Edition Patrick Frey. 2020. ISBN 978-3-906803-94-4.
- La légende punaisée dans le ciel: Manuel pour un livre. Brussels: Surfaces Utiles. 2021. ISBN 978-2931110-02-7.
- The Barefoot Promise. Brussels: Triangle Books. 2022. ISBN 978-2-930777-48-1.
