= Sergey Grinevich =

Belarusian painter (born 1960)

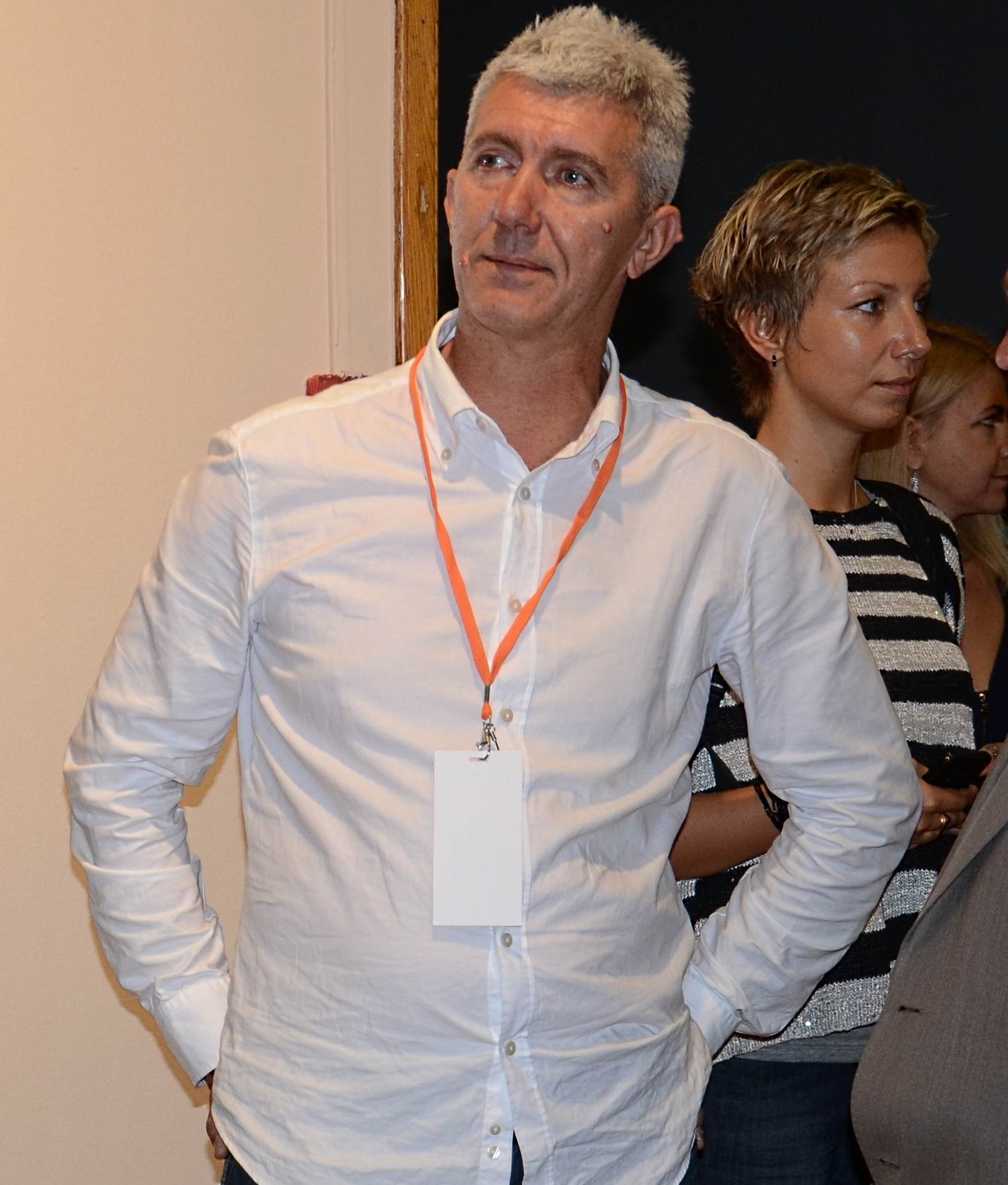
- Born: 25 February 1960 (age 66); Grodno, Belarusian SSR, USSR

Sergey Grinevich (Belarusian: Сяргей Грыневіч; born 25 February 1960, in Grodno) is a Belarusian painter.

== Biography ==
Grinevich was born in 1960 in the Byelorussian Soviet Socialist Republic near Grodno. From 1971 to 1978 he was a student in the city's Republican school of Fine Art. In 1978 he began his studies at the Belarusian State Academy of Arts (Department of monumental painting), where he graduated in 1983. He has taken part in art exhibitions since 1982.

== Work ==
Sergey Grinevich is now one of the most influential artists in Belarus. Together with Juri Jacovenko, Valentina Choba, Vladimir Panteleev and Victoria Iliyna, he is a member of an artist group there.

- Artist about himself: I have painted all my life and, oddly enough, with every year there appear more and more mysteries in this profession for me. Perhaps this permanent intrigue, and the desire to get closer to the unknown keeps me in the profession, which in the great scheme of things is not actually a profession, but my life choice ...

== Notable exhibitions (group and solo) ==
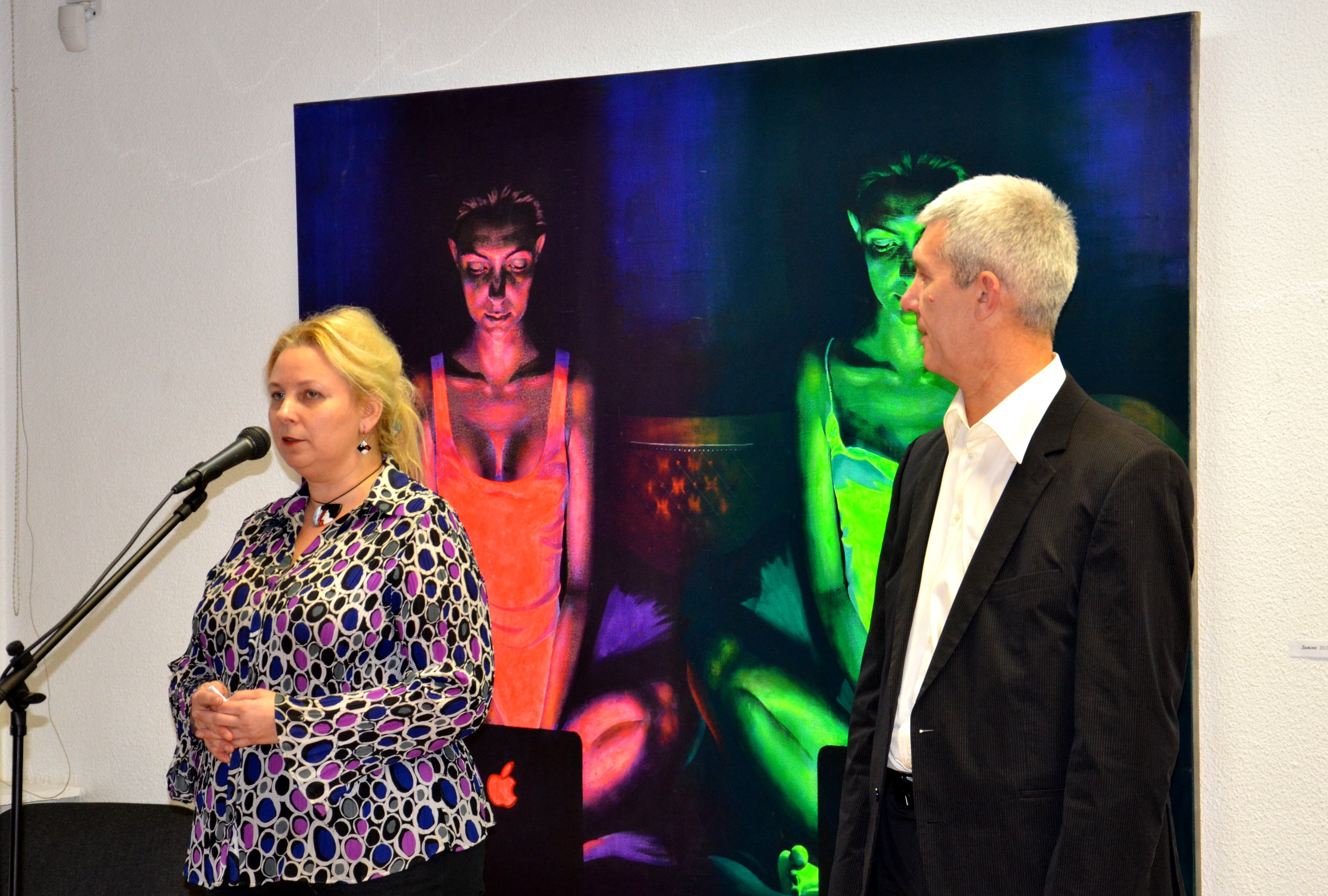
Natalya Sharangovich, The Director of Museum of Contemporary Art, Minsk and Sergey Grinevich. Solo Show in Museum of Contemporary Art, Minsk 2013

2019

- Beijing International Art Biennale, China.

== Literature ==
- Friedrich Kisters: Sergey Grinevich Blick und Richtung, published in Switzerland by Human Bios GmbH, Kreuzlingen (2013) Language: German ISBN 3-03742-002-2; ISBN 978-3-03742-002-7 Hardcover: 200 pages
