= Ron Laboray =

American painter

- Born: 1970 (age 55–56)
- Occupation: visual artist

Ron Laboray (born 1970) is a visual artist best known for conceptual art and painting.

== Studio history ==
The work of Ron Laboray has been displayed in museums, special project spaces, not for profits and galleries in cities such as Los Angeles, Chicago, Taiwan, Japan, Memphis, Tennessee Sadalia, and St. Louis, Missouri.

His exhibition "After The C.E." at the University of Missouri was reviewed in Art in America magazine.

The website of Peter Miller Gallery in Chicago describes Laboray's art as merging abstract painting and a pseudoscientific method to create a visual archive of popular culture. This method appropriates existing laws found in sciences, like the Law of Superposition, and the artist's sculptural mixed media mechanisms. The mediums used range from the digital to plastic, aluminum, auto lacquer, decals and marker which are all metaphoric of popular culture. Abstract painting's beautiful object collides with a color-coded archive based on mass culture elements like television, cinema. comic books and advertising.

Major group exhibition have included Terra Incognita at The Contemporary Art Museum, St Louis included in the exhibition were Julie Mahretu, Lordy Rodriguez, and Mark Lombardi.

Transpolyblu a Digital Exhibition including Wil Mentor, Sabina Ott, and Chuck Close.

In December 2024, Laboray exhibited Pretty Power at AOC F58 Galleria Bruno Lisi in Rome, curated by Camilla Boemio. The exhibition featured three large-scale layered drawings exploring the relationship between power and beauty, alongside animated music videos produced by Little Richard's Almanac, a creative collective Laboray founded with his partner Niki Elliott in 2023. In October 2025, Laboray presented Time and Random Data in Sequence at De Bouwput in Amsterdam, also curated by Boemio, which included works from the Pretty Power series.

== Bibliography ==
Reviews and description of Ron Laboray's work and exhibitions can be seen in the following publications:

- St Louis Magazine – Cameo: A Peek into the Studio of Ron Laboray- November 2010 – by Hesse Caplinger
- Art in America - April 2006 - review “ Ron Laboray at UMSL St Louis” Mel Watkins
- Chicago Tribune - May 13, 2005- “Ron Laboray Lets Data Drive His Abstractions” Alan G. Artner
- River Front Times - Current Art- Review -Ron Laboray: After the C.E. Sept 2005
- St. Louis Post Dispatch - July 14, 2002 Arts and Entertainment-Putting Art on the Map by Jeff Daniels
- Chicago Sun-Times - February 2, 2001 Gallery Glance by Margaret Hawkins
- New Art Examiner -May/June, 2001 Vol.28 # 8/9 Chicago's West Loop Gate by Lori Waxman
- Art Papers magazine - May/June, 2001 Vol.25.3 Reviews Central - St. Louis by Jeffrey Huges
