= Klara Kristalova =

Swedish sculptor of Czech origin

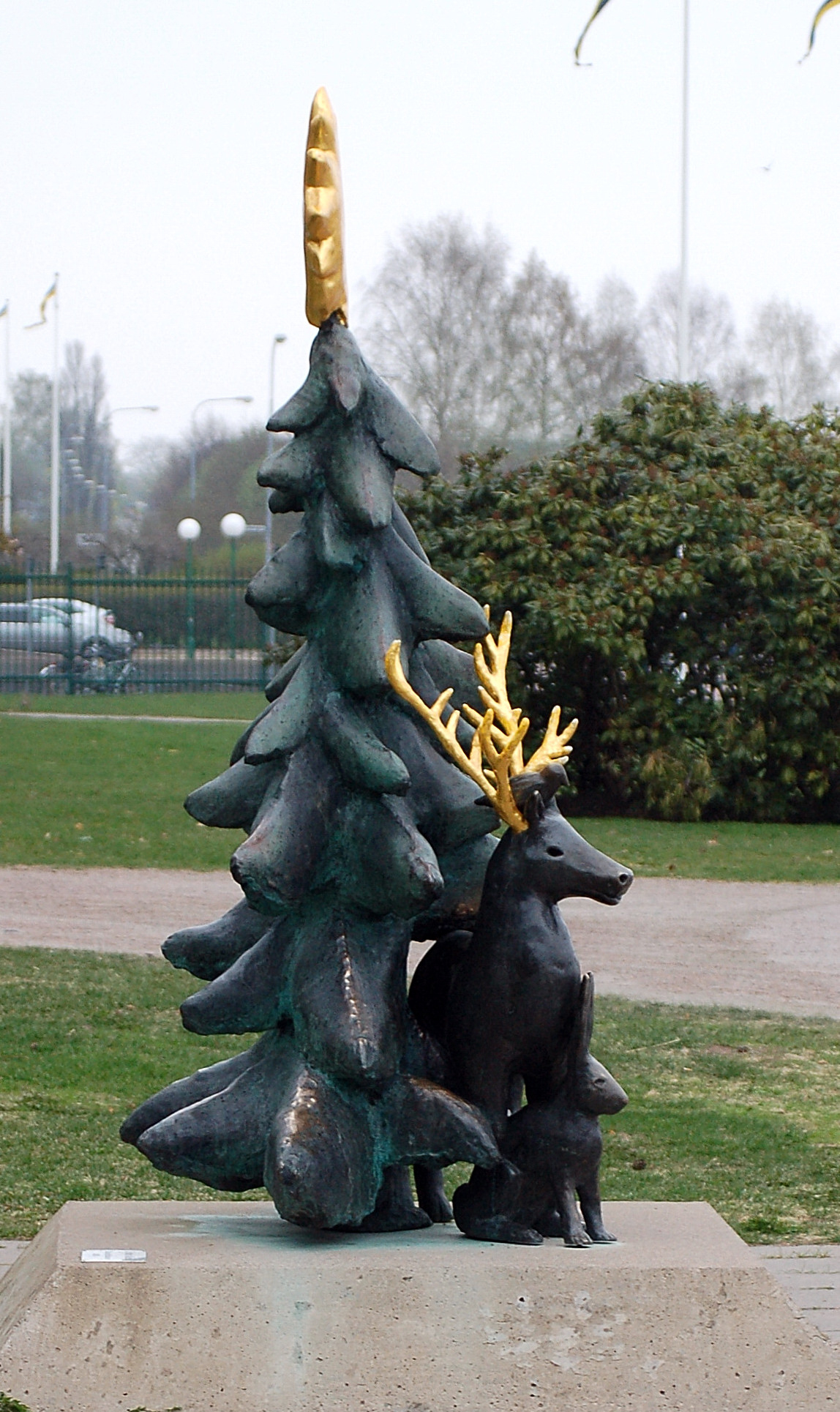
Under solen by Klara Kristalova at Mariebergsskogen Karlstad, Sweden

Klara Kristalova (born 1967) is a sculptor who works predominantly in ceramics and stoneware. She employs a deliberately imperfect Meissen porcelain technique, working in a similar fashion but with larger forms and figures. She lives and works in Sweden. Kristalova has exhibited internationally in solo and group shows in London, Paris, Miami, New York, Tokyo, Amsterdam, Santa Fe as part of Museum Site Santa Fe, Stockholm at the National Museum, West Palm Beach at the Norton Museum of Art, and Santa Barbara in the Santa Barbara Contemporary Arts Forum.

== Personal background ==
Klara Kristalova was born in Czechoslovakia and raised in Sweden; she currently lives and works in Norrtälje, Sweden. Her father is Czech artist Eugen Krajcik, and her mother was Helena Kristalova. She attended the Royal University College of Fine Arts, Stockholm, 1988-93.

== Professional background ==
Kristalova is known for her ceramic sculptures that have a fantastical quality while exploring darker narratives. Traditional myths, fairy tales, and other literary sources, such as Hans Christian Andersen, Selma Lagerlöf, Gösta Berling, old DC comics, and Oscar Wilde, serve as an inspiration to her work. By using these works and adding her own twist, Kristalova explores memory, trauma, and the lost territory of childhood. Her characters are mostly girls who morph into flora, fauna, and other natural elements.

According to art critic Anders Olofsson, "Klara Kristalova is a storyteller who uses the plasticity of sculpture to build micro worlds, where something peculiar has just happened or is about to happen. Here she relates to a sculpture tradition that has its roots several hundred years in the past. In this tradition the three-dimensional artwork is seen as a means of three-dimensionally "educating" the viewer in a realm inhabited by both the viewer and the artwork simultaneously through their common physical relationship to the room."

Kristalova has exhibited internationally in solo and group shows in London, Paris, Miami, New York, Tokyo, Amsterdam, Santa Fe as part of Site Santa Fe, Stockholm at the Nationalmuseum, West Palm Beach at the Norton Museum of Art, and Santa Barbara in the Santa Barbara Contemporary Arts Forum. In 2011, she had a solo exhibition at Lehmann Maupin Gallery. Kristalova’s first survey at an American Museum was exhibited in 2014 at the Norton Museum of Art, West Palm Beach, Florida. She has created numerous public commissions in Sweden, such as the memorial in the public garden park in Tungelsta, Stockholm; the entrance to Karlstad public park; and sculptures at Ostersunds University. Her work is part of public collections, including the Moderna Museet, Stockholm, Sweden, and the Nationalmuseum, Stockholm, Sweden.
