= Andil Gosine =

Trinidadian Canadian artist, curator, and academic

- Born: 1973 (age 52–53); Trinidad and Tobago
- Occupations: artist, academic, curator
- Known for: creating and curating art related to the Asian Caribbean experience
- Awards: Getty Scholar

Academic background
- Education: PhD in Sociology from York University, 2002

Academic work
- Discipline: Environmental Art and Justice
- Institutions: York University
- Notable works: Nature’s Wild: Love, Sex, and Law in the Caribbean (2021); "Everything Slackens in a Wreck" (2022)
- Website: Andil Gosine

Andil Gosine is a Trinidadian Canadian artist, curator, and academic. Raised in a rural area of Trinidad, he moved to Canada as a teenager. He completed his PhD in Sociology and became a professor at York University. His book Nature's Wild (2021) deals with questions of sexuality, dehumanization, and human-animal relations in the Caribbean. While on fellowship at the Fashion Institute of Technology, he created WARDROBES, a series of art pieces that he later developed into performance art. He has curated several exhibitions, including "Everything Slackens in a Wreck" (2022), which featured Asian Caribbean artists. His "Nature's Wild" show was unexpectedly cancelled by the Art Museum of the Americas in 2025 at the beginning of Donald Trump's second presidency.

== Early life and education ==
Gosine was born in 1973 in Trinidad and raised in the rural area of George Village, Tableland. His ancestors were Indian indentured laborers brought to Trinidad and Tobago to replace African slaves as cheap labor. As a teen he attended an all-boys Catholic school in San Fernando. At age 14, his family moved to Oshawa, Ontario, a city near Toronto. There Gosine felt watched by authority figures and like he needed to prove that he was "not wild, not an animal". In his senior year of high school, Gosine interned at the New Democratic Party (NDP) where he wrote about the negative impacts of free trade.

Gosine attended college at York University. He published an interview with John Beck in the student newspaper. Beck, a far-right candidate in Reform Party in the 1993 Canadian federal election, made statements against gay marriage and immigration. The Reform Party denounced Beck, forcing him to withdraw from the election. After graduating, Gosine entered into a longterm relationship and travelled frequently to Paris to visit his boyfriend. Ed Broadbent encouraged him to become an NDP politician, but Gosine ultimately decided against it. His master's thesis, "All the Wrong Places: Looking for Love in Third World Poverty" (1998), seeks to challenge common views about sexuality in the Caribbean. In 2002, Gosine completed his PhD in sociology at York University with a dissertation about the French Green Party.

== Career ==
For two years, Gosine worked on LGBTQ policy at the World Bank, eventually returning to York University to serve as an assistant professor of sociology. After breaking up with his partner, Gosine moved to New York City to start a fellowship at the Fashion Institute of Technology in 2010. While there, he met several artists including Geoffrey Hendricks, Alison Knowles, Lorraine O’Grady, and Karen Finley. Although he did not consider himself an artist at the time, he felt an affinity with the artists he met, particularly O'Grady. In June 2010, Gosine and O'Grady worked on a recording to be used for the audio track for O'Grady's video installation, Landscape (Western Hemisphere). They spoke about several topics including love and human-animal relations. Ultimately their conversation was not included in O'Grady's piece but was later released as an interview. O'Grady's art and thought deeply influenced Gosine. At FIT, Gosine first worked on WARDROBES, several pieces related to clothing.

Gosine continued working as both a scholar and an artist, eventually becoming a Professor of Environmental Arts and Justice at York. He also serves on the editorial committee of the Small Axe journal.

=== WARDROBES (2011-2015) ===
Initially, Gosine created WARDROBES as four objects: Cutlass, Orhni, Rum and Roti, and Scrubs. The objects symbolize both beauty and violence. In Cutlass and Ohrni, Gosine reproduced traditional Indo-Caribbean objects, calling them "as much markers of oppression as they are evidence of the creative agency of women who lived through miserable conditions". Gosine later developed WARDROBES into performance art: Cutlass, Orhni, Rum and Roti, and (Made in Love). In his 2012 Cutlass performance, the audience heard a recording of Gosine talking about his childhood memories about cutlasses, including killing a snake and cutting coconuts. Then Gosine came to the front of the gallery and prepared a memorial of candles and flowers, in honor of his great-grandmother. Afterwards, Mélissa Laveaux performed several songs, including "My Boat" and Tina Turner's "Private Dancer".

In Cane Portraiture, Gosine took photos of Caribbean immigrants in New York in front of a picture of sugar cane fields. Afterwards, the subjects took their photos home. With this series, Gosine sought to undermine the idea that European photographers were completely in control while creating Victorian era postcards of Caribbean women. He stated: "I don’t think we should strip the subjects of all their agency. When I look at his images, I see possibilities that perhaps they were choosing how they were wanting to be represented as well". According to scholar Matthew Ryan Smith, the sugar cane represents both the suffering of indentured laborers and "home" for Caribbeans: "at once an act of mourning and a source of strength".

=== "All the Flowers" and "Coolie Coolie Viens" (2018) ===
"All the Flowers", a solo show of Gosine's art, opened in Oshawa, Ontario in early 2018. Gosine travelled to Trinidad to collect flowers for the show. The show was referred to as: "an autobiography in flora." A recurring image in the show is the Ixora flower, an Indian plant that was brought to Trinidad. After a visitor criticized a "mature content" warning sign as homophobic, the gallery removed it and apologized.

Later that year, Gosine's collaborative show "Coolie Coolie Viens" opened at Western University. The title references “coolie, coolie, come for curry”, a derogatory chant directed at Indo–Trinidadians and Tobagonians. The exhibit included art that represents the merging of both Indian and Caribbean culture. One artwork was a video installation called (Made in Love) that features a photo of Gosine's parents that is gradually covered by a photo of Gosine and Vivek Shraya. A cover of the song "A Whiter Shade of Pale" plays in the background. Scholar Nalini Mohabir stated that the artwork "suggests a latent knowledge of 'home' for me, one not completely disappeared by migration, but under cover." Another artwork was "Our Holy Waters, and Mine", video of a performance piece by Gosine in which he pours water into mason jars that are labeled with "kala pani" and the names of 12 bodies of water that Gosine's ancestors or Gosine himself travelled on. "Our holy waters are not the Ganges" is chanted 108 times. The piece was performed at the Queens Museum in 2014 and the Museum of Latin American Art in 2018.

=== "rêvenir" (2020) ===
In February 2020, "rêvenir", Gosine's first show in the Caribbean opened in Trinidad. The show included a series of photographs of random objects that Gosine took while dating a closeted man who did not want his photo taken. Another piece, Stories, is a video of Gosine kissing a man while staring at the camera. In his review, Colin Robinson wrote: "Gosine’s art is about small, evocative gestures. With lots of meaning loaded under them". That month, Gosine also published an essay about the end of a long-term relationship, due in part to his family's inability to accept his queerness.

=== Nature’s Wild: Love, Sex, and Law in the Caribbean (2021) ===
In his book Nature’s Wild: Love, Sex, and Law in the Caribbean (2021), Gosine describes the impact of the colonial depiction of Caribbean people as animals and uncivilized, which seeks to distinguish between colonizer and colonized people. The dehumanization of some Caribbeans extended after independence to marginalized groups including poor and queer people. According to Gosine, the book's primary message is that "we carry anxieties about the line between human and non-human nature. In a lot of what we do, culturally we have been tasked with showing our distance from animals even though, scientifically, humans are animal." An article in n+1 summarized the book's premise as: "We are animals. So what?" Within the book, Gosine discusses queer culture and history in the Caribbean, including the criminalization of homosexuality, the activism of Colin Robinson, and the art of Kelly Sinnapah Mary. The book was given the Duke University Press Scholars of Color First Book Award.

=== "Everything Slackens in a Wreck" (2022) ===
In 2012, Gosine attended a Caribbean art exhibit in New York City. He noticed a lack of Indo-Caribbean representation, and it inspired him to curate his own exhibitions of Asian Caribbean art. For several years he worked on a project entitled Visual Arts After Indenture, researching artists descended from Asian-Caribbean indentured laborers. As part of this project, he curated a retrospective of Wendy Nanan at the Art Museum of the Americas.

"Everything Slackens in a Wreck" opened in 2022 at the Ford Foundation and featured art by Margaret Chen, Andrea Chung, Wendy Nanan, and Kelly Sinnapah Mary. Additionally, Gosine collaborated with the organization Jahajee Sisters on a sound installation featuring members talking about what brings them joy and comfort. The exhibit's title is from a poem by Khal Torabully, which Gosine interprets as "the kind of loosening that often accompanies disaster", noting that caste was abolished and gender roles evolved amid the suffering of Indian indentured laborers in the Caribbean. Gosine aimed to highlight the strength and resilience of Indo-Caribbean people despite the brutality of their history. Art scholar Vanessa Godden stated that the exhibit "showcases artwork that contends with the legacies of Asian indentureship in the Caribbean, addresses the trauma of this history, and envisions these legacies beyond traumatic impact."

=== "The Plural of He" (2024) ===
In 2024, Gosine curated "The Plural of He", an exhibit about deceased queer activist Colin Robinson, at the Leslie-Lohman Museum of Art. Five artists, including Devan Shimoyama and Natalie Wood, completed a residency at the museum and created artwork inspired by material from Robinson's personal archives. Richard Fung also contributed to the show. The exhibit included essays by people who knew Robinson, including poet Shivanee Ramlochan.

=== "Nature's Wild" (2025) ===
For three years, Gosine worked on a show called "Nature's Wild" at Art Museum of the Americas. The exhibit, inspired by his book of the same title, included artwork from Lorraine O’Grady and several other artists. One piece, Lifetime Achievement, was a collaboration between Gosine, Romy Ceppetelli, and Zachari Logan. It features a photo of Gosine on all fours and naked except for a saddle on his back and a cross necklace. Another piece was Magna Carta, a childhood photo of Gosine wearing sparkling shoes near some chickens.

The museum, which is run by the Organization of American States, unexpectedly called off the show in February 2025 before it opened. The cancellation came after President Donald Trump issued directives to eliminate DEI initiatives and review US funding for international organizations. The funding for "Nature's Wild" was not at risk because it was almost entirely funded by grants, Canada Council for the Arts, WorldPride, and the Canadian mission to the OAS. A reworked version of the show opened in October 2025 at Paul Petro Contemporary Art in Toronto. It featured collaborations between Gosine and other artists, including Deborah Root's painting of Tim McCaskell and Richard Fung and Magna Carta.

=== Coolie Créole: Art For and Against ‘Us’ (2026) ===
In 2026, Gosine was a Getty Scholar and worked on a project called Coolie Créole: Art For and Against ‘Us’.
