= Zachari =

Zachari is a masculine given name. Notable people with the name include:

- Zachari Bankolé, Ivorian actor
- Zachari Logan (born 1980), Canadian visual artist
- Zachari Zachariev (1904–1987), Bulgarian military pilot and commander
- Zachari Zeegelaar (born 1989), Surinamese football assistant referee

== See also ==
- Zachary, masculine given name
