= Nanan =

Nanan may refer to:

== Places ==
=== India ===
- Nanan, Bilara, a village in Bilara Tehsil, Jodhpur District, Rajasthan

=== China ===
- Nan'an, Fujian (南安市), county-level city of Quanzhou, Fujian
- Nan'an, Dayu County (南安镇), town in Dayu County, Shanxi
- Nan'an, Wenshui County (南安镇), a village in Wenshui County, Shanxi
- Nan'an District (南岸区), Chongqing

== People ==
- Rangy Nanan (1953–2016), former West Indian cricketer
- Wendy Nanan (born 1955), artist from Trinidad and Tobago
