= Claire Tancons =

Guadeloupean art historian

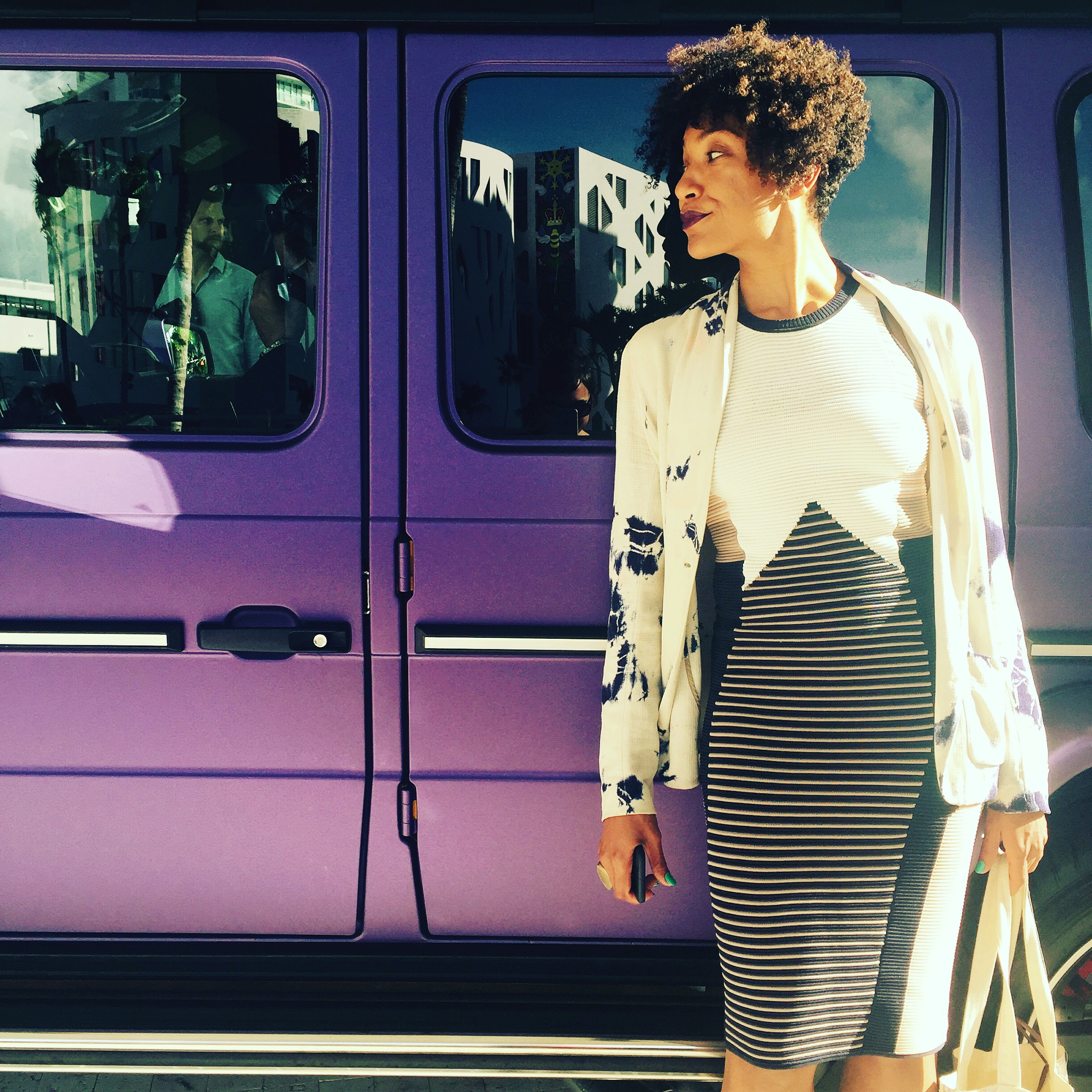
- Tancons in 2016
- Born: Guadeloupe
- Education: Lycée Henri-IV's Hypochartes; École du Louvre BA in History of Art (1998) and MA in Museum Studies (1999); Courtauld Institute of Art MA in History of Art (2000)
- Occupations: Art histrian, curator and critic
- Known for: Artistic Director of Nuit Blanche 2024

Claire Tancons is a curator, critic, and historian of art. She was born in Guadeloupe and is currently based in Paris, after living for nearly two decades between the Caribbean, primarily in Trinidad & Tobago, and the United States, mostly in New York and New Orleans.

== Education ==
Following a background in history at the Lycée Henri-IV's Hypochartes (preparatory course for the École des Chartes, one of France's Grandes Écoles), Tancons completed a BA degree in History of Art (1998) and MA in Museum Studies (1999) at the École du Louvre in Paris, and in 2000 received an MA in History of Art at the Courtauld Institute of Art in London. She was a Helena Rubenstein Curatorial Fellow at the Whitney Museum of American Art's Independent Study Program in New York City from 2000 to 2001.

== Career ==
=== Early work ===
In her early years in New York City, following the Whitney fellowship, Tancons worked as a personal assistant and curatorial research assistant for artist Coco Fusco on the exhibition Only Skin Deep: Changing Visions of the American Self (2003). She also became involved with Lorna Simpson, with the artist featuring Tancons in her video work 31 (2002). She subsequently did a one-year curatorial fellowship at the Walker Art Center, where she assisted with the major exhibition How Latitudes Become Forms: Art in a Global Age, curated by Philippe Vergne, Douglas Fogle, and Kemi Ilesanmi.

Increasingly interested in performance art, Tancons curated the first solo exhibitions in New York City for South African artist Robin Rhode and choreographer Ralph Lemon, both of whom she met while at the Walker Art Center: Robin Rhode: The Score (Artists Space, New York City, 2004), and Ralph Lemon: (The efflorescence of) Walter (The Kitchen, New York City, 2007), co-curated with Anthony Allen and later traveling in expanded form to the Contemporary Arts Center (New Orleans). During this time, Tancons also did a brief stint at Paula Cooper Gallery, where she curated the Paul D. Miller (DJ Spooky) exhibition Path is Prologue (2004), based on his multimedia performance piece DJ Spooky's Rebirth of a Nation.

=== Carnival and Processional Performance ===
Tancons' work of the past decade has focused on histories and contemporary practices of carnival and processional performance – particularly among the African diaspora – as well as public ceremonial culture, civic ritual, and popular protest movements. Tancons has notably postulated an alternative genealogy of performance art that is routed in Africa, its diaspora, and the legacy of slavery rather than in the European avant-garde. Her curatorial work has gained recognition for exploring ways of curating outside traditional exhibitory modes - namely, procession, carnival, the second line, walking, marching, parading, and other forms of public ceremony - and for popularizing the term and practice of processional performance. She has also contributed to the anti-capitalism discourse following the Occupy movement and other protest movements, incorporating protest into her curatorial approach and reclaiming, in her words, the "rebellious potential" of the carnavalesque - "as a medium of emancipation and a catalyst for civil disobedience" - in writings such as "Occupy Wall Street: Carnival Against Capital? Carnivalesque as Protest Sensibility."

During a 2004 residency at the Trinidadian contemporary arts center CCA7, which led to the exhibition Lighting the Shadow: Trinidad In and Out of Light, Tancons began to explore carnival as a contemporary art practice. The residency led to Tancons' collaborations with Trinidadian contemporary artist Marlon Griffith, as well as famed carnival artist, or mas-man, Peter Minshall and his carnival production team The Callaloo Company. A subsequent engagement with carnival and procession was the exhibition Mas': From Process to Procession? Caribbean Carnival as Art Practice, which Tancons curated in 2007 at the BRIC Rotunda Gallery, New York. The exhibition featured artists with ties to the Caribbean whose work recognized carnival as a vital contemporary art form. In 2014 she organized Up Hill Down Hall: An Indoor Carnival as part of the BMW Tate Live Series at Tate Modern. Described by Tancons as "a mass public processional performance," the project drew on carnival as a ritual of resistance. Performances by artists Marlon Griffith and Hew Locke, along with hundreds of participants, were staged in Tate Modern's Turbine Hall. In 2015, the exhibition EN MAS': Carnival and Performance Art of the Caribbean, which Tancons initiated and curated with art historian Krista Thompson, opened at the Contemporary Arts Center (New Orleans), before traveling to various locations in the Caribbean and the United States with Independent Curators International. EN MAS' had won the Emily Hall Tremaine Exhibition Award in 2012. Tancons has also collaborated with New Orleans Airlift Artistic Director Delaney Martin to organize the performances Public Practice: An Anti-Violence Community Ceremony (2014) and Rally Under the Bridge (2014) in New Orleans, Louisiana.

=== International biennials and festivals ===
Active in the field of international contemporary art biennials, Tancons was most recently a curator for Sharjah Biennial 14: Leaving the Echo Chamber (with Zoe Butt and Omar Kholeif) for which she curated the "Look for Me All Around You", a platform dedicated to problematizing the politics of performance under globalizing conditions of dispossession and diasporization.

She was Associate Curator for the inaugural edition of Prospect New Orleans, from 2007-2009. In 2008, she organized the processional performance SPRING for the 7th Gwangju Biennial, under the direction of Okwui Enwezor, which received numerous positive reviews. SPRING merged the forms of carnival parade, political demonstration, and funeral procession with performances in the streets of Gwangju by Mario Benjamin, Marlon Griffith, Jin Won Lee, Jarbas Lopes, MAP Office, Karyn Olivier, and Caecilia Tripp. Additionally, Tancons was a guest curator for CAPE 09 in 2009; an associate curator with Anne Szefer Karlsen and Olivier Marbœuf, for Biennale Bénin 2012: Inventing the World. The Artist as Citizen under the artistic direction of Abdellah Karroum; and a curator, with Ragnar Kjartansson & Andjeas Ejiksson, Katerina Gregos, and Joanna Warza, of the 2013 Göteborg International Biennial for Contemporary Art, PLAY!: Recapturing the Radical Imagination, under the artistic direction of Edi Muka and Stina Edblom.

Tancons was also a curator for Printemps de Septembre, working with Mohamed Bourouissa and Christophe Chassol on Etcetera: Un Rituel Civique in 2016 and 2017; a curator (with Johanna Auguiac) of Hétéronomonde, the first edition of Tout-Monde Festival organized by the Cultural Services of the French Embassy in Miami, presenting works by artist Julien Creuzet, Kelly Sinnapah Mary, Kenny Dunkan, Jean-François Boclé among others and the Artistic Director of Tide by Side, the opening ceremony of the Faena District in Miami Beach working with Arto Lindsay as Musical Director and Gia Wolff as Architectural Director, featuring Marinela Senatore, Miralda, and Los Carpinteros.

== Recent work ==
Since moving to Europe, Tancons was a curator of Ceremony (Burial of an Undead World) at Haus der Kulturen der Welt, Berlin, under the direction of Anselm Franke along with Elisa Giuliano, Denise Ryner and Zairong Xiang (2022).

In Paris, she has been actively working on Van Lévé: Visions Souveraines des Amériques et de l'Amazonie Créoles et Marronnes, the first collective exhibition on the emerging generation of Caribbean French artists for which she received a Ford Foundation research fellowship.

She is the Artistic Director of Nuit Blanche 2024 slated for June 1, 2024, the twenty-third edition of the original Nuit Blanche born in Paris, a format, and brand, that has since gone on to becoming global.

== Publications ==
Tancons' writings have appeared in numerous journals, including: Nka: Journal of Contemporary African Art, Third Text, e-flux journal, and Small Axe: A Caribbean Journal of Criticism. Earlier monographic writings on artists Robin Rhode, David Hammons, and Chris Ofili appeared in Nka with texts on Rhode later published in monographs such as Robin Rhode: Catch Air (Columbus, OH: Wexner Center for the Arts, 2009) and on Hammons in the catalogue of 2004 Dak'Art Biennale and reprinted in Third Text. A text on Marlon Griffith was recently published in his first monograph, Marlon Griffith: Symbols of Endurance (Toronto: Art Gallery of York University, 2018).

Tancons' "Occupy Wall Street: Carnival Against Capital? Carnivalesque as Protest Sensibility," which first appeared in e-flux journal, has been translated and re-published many times, including in the anthology The Political Aesthetics of Global Protest: The Arab Spring and Beyond (Edinburgh: Edinburgh University Press, 2014), while "Curating Carnival: Performance in Contemporary Caribbean Art," another oft-cited paper, was published in Curating in the Caribbean (Berlin: The Greenbox, 2012).

In 2016, Tancons co-edited EN MAS': Carnival and Performance Art of the Caribbean with Krista Thompson, the catalogue of the eponymous exhibition, featuring essays from Thompson and herself as well as Shannon Jackson and Kobena Mercer, and monographic texts from Annie Paul, Paul Goodwin, and Thomas Lax, among others. That same year, Tancons was listed as one of the "20 Most Influential Young Curators in the US" by Artsy.

She has also been featured in interviews and essays in curatorial anthologies such as Truth is Concrete: A Handbook for Artistic Strategies in Real Politics (Berlin: Sternberg Press, 2014), The New Curator (London: Laurence King Publishing, 2016), Perform, Experience, Re-live: BMW Tate Live Program (London: Tate Publishing, 2016) and, also in 2016, and in the online glossary "In Terms of Performance", from the Pew Center for Arts and Heritage and University of California, Berkeley.

Her work is featured in Why I Do What I Do: Twenty Global Curators Speak, forthcoming at Sternberg Press (Fall 2024).

== Grants and awards (selected) ==
- Ford Foundation Travel & Research Fellowship for Van Lévé: Visions Souveraines des Amériques et de l'Amazonie Créoles et Marronnes (2023)
- Creative Capital / Andy Warhol Foundation Book Writing Grant (2018) for Roadworks: Processional Performance in the New Millennium
- Emily Hall Tremaine Exhibition Award, Emily Hall Tremaine Foundation, New Haven, CT (2012)
- Curatorial Research Fellowship, Institut Français, France (2011)
- Curatorial Research Fellowship, Andy Warhol Foundation for the Visual Arts, New York (2008)
- Travel and Research Grant, Foundation for Arts Initiatives (2008)
- Artistic Production Grant, Prince Claus Fund, The Netherlands (2008)
- Fund for Arts Research Grant, Foundation for Arts Initiatives (2007)
