= Colin Robinson =

Colin Robinson may refer to:

- Colin Robinson (footballer) (born 1960)
- Colin Robinson (activist) (1963–2021)
- Colin Robinson, an energy vampire character from the 2019 TV series What We Do in the Shadows
