= Lady Tambourine =

American gospel musician from Louisiana

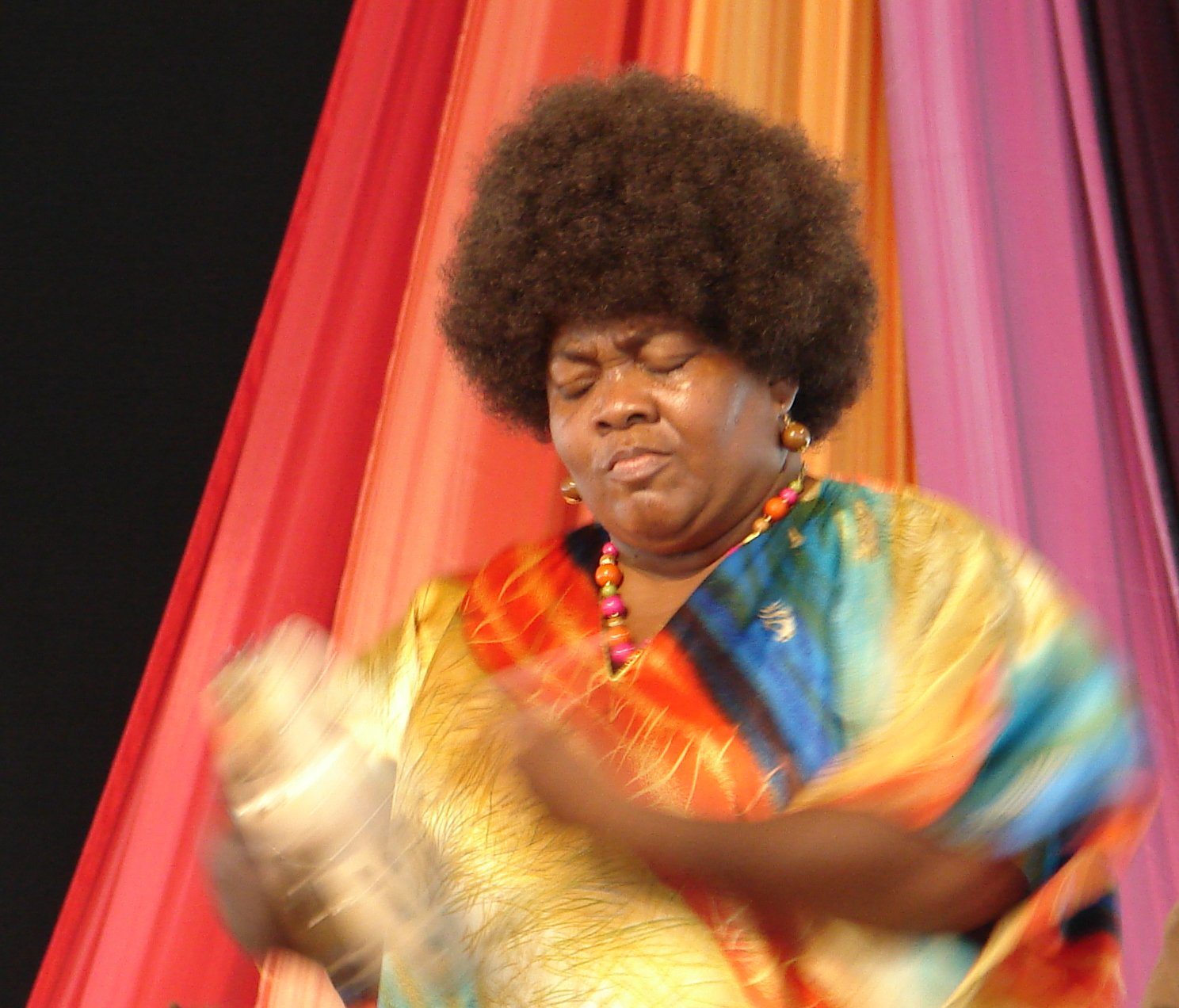
- 2008 at New Orleans Jazz & Heritage Festival

Background information
- Also known as: Rosalie Washington
- Born: 1957 (age 68–69); Denham Springs, Louisiana, US
- Origin: New Orleans
- Genres: Gospel, zydeco
- Occupation: Musician
- Instrument: Tambourine
- Years active: 1993–present

Rosalie Marie Ashton-Washington (born 1957), known as Lady Tambourine, is an American gospel musician from Louisiana, known for her skill at the tambourine.

Washington enjoys impromptu tambourine performances with gospel and zydeco groups, seeking out collaborations and invitations at live shows to join whoever is on stage. She hits the tambourine with her hands, elbows and knees so enthusiastically that she is in the habit of breaking her tambourines, and must carry spares. Funk bandleader Charmaine Neville says that Washington joins her on stage occasionally, "beating the hell out of the tambourine."

== Early life ==
Washington was born in Denham Springs, Louisiana, in 1957. When she was five years old, she witnessed her second cousin and godmother Wilhomenia Jackson Landry in church singing along with the congregation, playing the tambourine by a window, the instrument appearing surrounded by an aura of fire. Washington wished that she could play like that. She said later, "It took me years to realize that I had received the gift from heaven..."

At the age of 13, she sang in the local youth choir under director Kenneth Mitchell and then was accepted into the Louisiana All-State Youth Choir. In school, she learned how to play drums, congas, saxophone, trumpet, organ and other keyboards. Washington graduated from Denham Springs High School and then from Southern University in Baton Rouge in 1977 with a degree in journalism.

== Gospel music ==
Washington's first appearance at the New Orleans Jazz & Heritage Festival was on April 29, 1993, when she accompanied her friends the Banks Family, a gospel group from Violet, Louisiana, where she lived at the time. She had encouraged the Banks Family to apply to the festival, promising she would play tambourine with them. After the Banks Family performance in the festival's gospel tent, other gospel groups spontaneously asked Washington to play with them that same day or the next. After that, she returned to the gospel tent each year as a paid percussionist, available upon request. In that role she accompanied many famous gospel artists including Charles G. Hayes, Dottie Peoples, Richard Smallwood and Shirley Caesar.

In 2003, Washington joined Stevie Wonder on stage at the Essence Music Festival in New Orleans. She was in the audience at the Essence Fest in 2016 while French Montana was performing "Pop That" when another attendee recorded her playing the tambourine in the audience. He uploaded the video to Twitter and it went viral.

In 2003 at the New Orleans Jazz & Heritage Festival, Washington was rejected by several gospel groups who did not want her stage presence to take attention away from themselves. In 2007 she was physically prevented from entering the stage to accompany Bobby Jones and the Nashville Super Choir. A female police officer blocked the stairs up to the stage. Washington said later, "I used to play with every act, but I was getting all the attention, and all the pictures were being taken of me, so they put me off. Now I play in the Gospel Tent by invitation only." One of her performances in front of a gospel choir in 2007 was reviewed as channeling "uproarious joy".

The festival organizers knew that Washington was popular with the crowds, so in 2008 they gave her a third headliner set in the gospel tent, backed by the Greater Mount Calvary Missionary Baptist Church choir. Washington showed up 40 minutes late for her own set on April 25. A week later at the same Jazz Fest, she was invited on stage by country music star Tim McGraw to help him on the song "I Like It, I Love It." McGraw said, "It sorta happened organically... She was around, and I thought it was a cool thing." Washington also joined guitarist and singer Ruthie Foster in the blues tent for an electrifying song that was met with a standing ovation from an overflow audience. Foster said that Washington "was really, really gracious about waiting for me to let her know when I wanted her to come onstage. She took it to another level." In 2011, Washington jumped up on stage with Eric Lindell and his band to energize the Bo Diddley song "You Can't Judge a Book by the Cover", engaging Lindell's drummer Will McMains, with Lindell grinning the whole time. Singer-songwriter Dayna Kurtz said in 2012 about the Jazz Festival in New Orleans, "Look for the tambourine lady. If she's on stage in the gospel tent then you know the band is worthwhile."

Washington was honored as the featured performer in May 2017 at Gospel in the Park in Gonzales, Louisiana, backed by the Hosea Reddit Family. She performed at the first annual Riverfront Jazz Festival in Dallas, Texas, in September 2017, at the blues and soul main stage, joining the New Orleans Soul Band.

== Other music ==
Washington has played with many other artists including Rockin' Dopsie and the Zydeco Twisters in 2007 at the New Orleans Jazz & Heritage Festival. Washington has also joined New Orleans brass bands marching in town, and Mardi Gras Indians. She performed with an eclectic group of musicians led by Quintron in 2012 at the nonprofit collective New Orleans Airlift. She appears regularly with Charmaine Neville's funk band at Snug Harbor. Neville's veteran keyboard player Amasa Miller said about Washington, "She's one of those people who defy category. There's nobody doing what she does. There are musicians that forge their own little place. It becomes their own little calling card... the kind of no-category category."

Jazz and rock drummer Steve Gadd wrote a song inspired by Washington titled "Lady Tambourine".

== Acting ==
Washington appeared on stage in the community theatre musical Purlie, produced in New Orleans at Le Petit Theatre du Vieux Carre. Other stage plays include A Raisin in the Sun, To Kill a Mockingbird, The Rose Tattoo, and Tambourines to Glory. In 1995 she had a small part in the film Dead Man Walking and in 2003 she played gospel choir member Faye Jenkins in The Fighting Temptations. Other movies include the made-for-television Bump in the Night (1991), and the major studio films Runaway Jury (2003), Last Holiday (2006), American Violet (2008) and The Butler (2013). In the mid-2000s, she was seen in a series of television commercials for Winn-Dixie.

In April 2008, Washington took part in The Vagina Monologues musical stage production mounted inside the Mercedes-Benz Superdome in New Orleans as a benefit against violence. She accompanied Reverend Louis Dejean and the Voices of New Orleans Gospel Choir in a rousing number that sparked a barefoot dancing celebration from country music star Faith Hill.

== Personal life ==
After college in Baton Rouge, Washington married in 1980 and set up home in St. Bernard Parish, Louisiana. She and her husband had three children: Danny Jr, Danitra and Dantonio. After the marriage dissolved, she lived in various locations including Violet and Uptown New Orleans. In 2005, her Uptown residence was flooded by Hurricane Katrina, and she moved back to Baton Rouge.

Washington is known for her tambourine playing in support of Southern Jaguars football and LSU Tigers football games where she performs unrehearsed in the crowd along with the cheerleaders and marching band. Videos of her tambourine enthusiasm at football games went viral on Facebook in November and December 2017, leading to a profile about her on ABC News.
