= Norr Cohan =

James Cohan
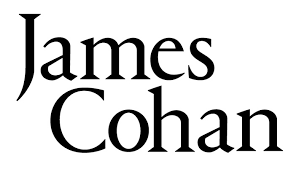
- Established: 1999
- Location: 48 Walker Street (Tribeca); 52 Walker Street (Tribeca)
- Coordinates: 40.7192°N 74.0034°W
- Type: Art gallery
- Founders: James and Jane Cohan
- Website: jamescohan.com

Norr Cohan, formerly James Cohan Gallery, is a contemporary art gallery in Tribeca, Manhattan, New York City. James and Jane Cohan founded the gallery in 1999. The gallery adopted its current name in July 2026 when David Norr assumed sole ownership.

== Locations ==
The gallery has had six primary locations in its history: an initial space on West 57th Street in Manhattan (1999–2002); a subsequent space at West 26th Street in Chelsea (2002–summer 2019); a second location in Shanghai, China (2008–15); a third satellite space at 291 Grand Street on the Lower East Side (November 2015–19; 2023–2025); a new main space relocation to Tribeca at 48 Walker Street (September 2019–present); and a second Tribeca space at 52 Walker Street (October 2021–present).

== History ==
James Cohan began his career as an art dealer after moving to New York from Cleveland in the 1980s with his wife Jane. He worked for over a decade, becoming the director of the John Weber Gallery and the Paula Cooper Gallery in SoHo, before working for Anthony d'Offay Gallery in London for most of the 1990s. His first exposure to art dealing came as a child through his uncle, the late Carl Solway, who operated a (still active) gallery for avant-garde work for over fifty years in Cincinnati, Ohio.

James and Jane Cohan founded their gallery in the fall of 1999 on West 57th Street with a show of late-1970s "photopieces" by the London-based collaborative duo Gilbert and George, followed by exhibitions featuring Robert Smithson and Trenton Doyle Hancock. The gallery moved to West 26th Street in Chelsea in 2002, where it represented a roster that included Chinese-American painter Yun-Fei Ji, British sculptor Richard Long, British-Nigerian artist Yinka Shonibare, painter Fred Tomaselli, video artist Bill Viola, and Chinese conceptualist Xu Zhen, among others.

In 2008, James Cohan opened a second space in Shanghai, China in a 1936 Art Deco villa once occupied by the military in the city's French Concession. Directed by Arthur Solway, the gallery sought to introduce American and European contemporary art to Chinese audiences and Chinese artists to the Cohan's New York programming. The Shanghai location operated through 2015. The gallery opened a third, satellite branch in November 2015 in a former fish market at 291 Grand Street on the Lower East Side (now closed). Directed by David Norr (formerly senior curator at the Wexner Center and MOCA Cleveland), the space was inaugurated with an exhibition of Robert Smithson's seldom-seen Pop works created between 1961 through 1964. Norr became an equity partner in the gallery five years later.

In September 2019, James Cohan Gallery relocated its main location from Chelsea to Tribeca, in a new 9,000-square-foot, two-level space at 50 Walker Street. It was inaugurated with an exhibition of Josiah McElheny's work, largely focused on glass, reflection optics and the nocturnal. The gallery opened an additional Tribeca space in October 2021 at 52 Walker Street.

In 2024, James Cohan Gallery joined with five other Manhattan art galleries—Bortolami, Kaufmann Repetto, Anton Kern, Andrew Kreps and Kurimanzutto—in the collaborative purchase of a 78,000-square-foot abandoned school and its surrounding land in Columbia County, N.Y., outside Hudson; the site was inaugurated as a new collective art space called "The Campus" in June 2024.

In 2026, Jane Cohan retired from her role at the gallery, while James Cohan announced he would continue to work with artists and collectors on a smaller scale. David Norr assumed sole ownership and leadership.

== Artists ==
In 2003, Observer described the gallery's programming approach as eclectic, with "a flair for presenting off-beat, curiously titled theme exhibitions that combine serious, established avant-garde artists of the past with attention-getting newer artists." Noting the mix of artists on the gallery's roster in 2018, ARTnews wrote that it suggested "a policy of inclusivity."

While in its Chelsea location in the 2000s, the gallery showed work by Yun-Fei Ji, video artist Hiraki Sawa, Yinka Shonibare, the collaborative duo Simon Evans, Japanese animation artist Tabaimo, marquetry artist Alison Elizabeth Taylor, Fred Tomaselli, Bill Viola and Xu Zhen, among others.

In the 2010s, the gallery began representing sculptor Kathy Butterly, conceptual artists Spencer Finch, Michelle Grabner and Katie Paterson, painters Federico Herrero, Byron Kim, Mernet Larsen, the late Lee Mullican and Scott Olson, Josiah McElheny, Vietnamese art collective The Propeller Group, Matthew Ritchie and Ethiopian artist Elias Sime. In 2017, an exhibit by then-gallery artist Omer Fast generated controversy when a coalition of Asian-American groups entered and protested the installation, making claims that the work was orientalist, gentrifying, colonizing and that it traded in stereotypes of Chinatown aesthetics. In a statement, Fast wrote that in re-creating the appearance of the building before the gallery moved in, he sought to heighten "the tension between appearance and essence" of the immigrant experience, which he related to his own as an Israel-born naturalized American.

Since moving to Tribeca, the gallery has begun to represent sculptors Alexandre da Cunha and Kennedy Yanko, the late Iranian artist Monir Shahroudy Farmanfarmaian, Delhi-based artist Gauri Gill, conceptualist Teresa Margolles, painters Kelly Sinnapah Mary, Jesse Mockrin, Eamon Ore-Giron, Kaloki Nyamai and Naudline Pierre, interdisciplinary artists Christopher Myers and Tuan Andrew Nguyen, textile artist Jordan Nassar and Diane Simpson.
