= Krista Thompson (art historian) =

Art historian

- Title: Weinberg College Board of Visitors Professor; Professor in the Department of Art History

Krista Thompson is an art historian. She serves as Weinberg College Board of Visitors Professor and Professor in the Department of Art History at Northwestern University. Her work focuses on modern and contemporary art and visual culture of the Africa diaspora, particularly the medium of photography.

Thompson earned her PhD in 2002 from Emory University.

In 2009 Thompson won the Driskell Prize from the High Museum of Art in Atlanta, recognizing "an original and important contribution to the field of African American art or art history."

In 2014, she creates an exhibition entitled En Mas’: Carnival and Performance Art of the Caribbean in collaboration with art curator Claire Tancons.

== Works ==
- An Eye for the Tropics: Photography, Tourism, and Framing the Caribbean Picturesque (Duke University Press, 2006)
- Developing Blackness: Studio Photographs of “Over the Hill” Nassau in the Independence Era (National Art Gallery of the Bahamas, 2008)
- Shine: The Visual Economy of Light in African Diasporic Aesthetic Practice (Duke University Press, 2015)
- with Claire Tancons, En Mas': Carnival and Performance Art of the Caribbean (Independent Curators International, 2015)
