= Lorraine O'Grady =

American artist (1934–2024)

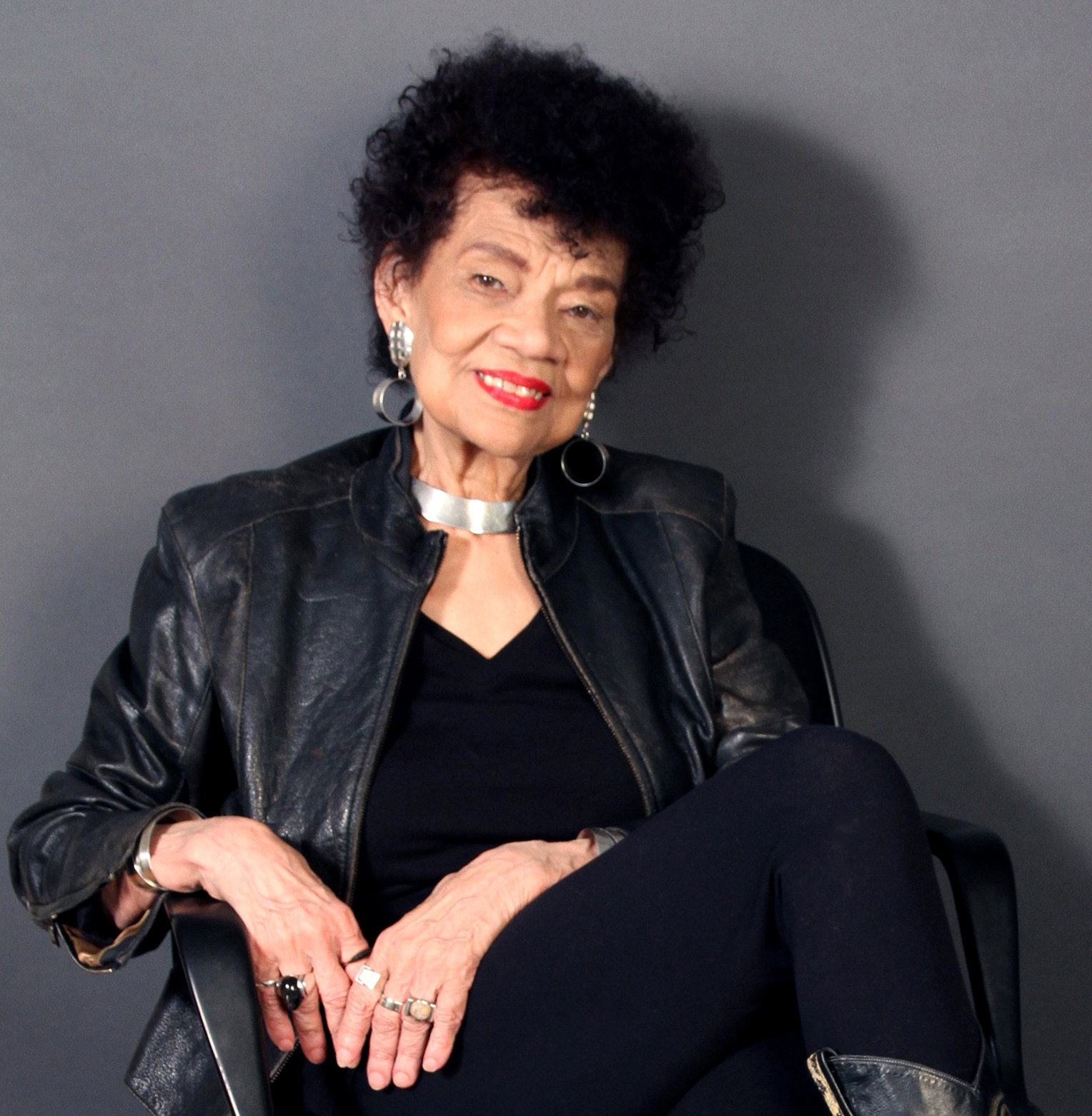
- O'Grady in 2014
- Born: September 21, 1934; Boston, Massachusetts, U.S.
- Died: December 13, 2024 (aged 90); New York City, U.S.
- Other name: Mlle Bourgeoise Noire
- Known for: Criticism, Conceptual Art, Performance Art
- Website: lorraineogrady.com

Lorraine O'Grady (September 21, 1934 – December 13, 2024) was an American artist, writer, translator, and critic. Working in conceptual art and performance art that integrates photo and video installation, she explored the cultural construction of identity – particularly that of Black female subjectivity – as shaped by the experience of diaspora and hybridity. O'Grady studied at Wellesley College and the University of Iowa Writers' Workshop before becoming an artist at the age of 45. Regarding the purpose of art, O'Grady said in 2016: "I think art's first goal is to remind us that we are human, whatever that is. I suppose the politics in my art could be to remind us that we are all human."

== Life and work ==
O'Grady was born in Boston, Massachusetts, on September 21, 1934, to Jamaican parents, Edwin and Lena O'Grady, who helped establish St. Cyprian's, the first West Indian Episcopal church in Boston. Drawn to the form and aesthetics of the "high church" of nearby St. John's of Roxbury Crossing, O'Grady recalled: "I was permanently formed by the aesthetics of that experience, of the rituals, which are a more stately and elegant version of Roman Catholicism. I did believe until my mid-twenties, until my sister [Devonia] died, then I stopped believing."

In 1955, O'Grady graduated from Wellesley College, where she majored in economics and minored in Spanish literature. While at Wellesley, she was one of three Black women in her class; she told The New York Times that this trio of girls was "totally invisible". She married her first husband, Robert Jones, with whom she had a son, while she was in school. She was later honored with a Wellesley College Alumnae Achievement Award in 2017. After graduating from Wellesley, O'Grady worked in the Labor and State Departments as an intelligence analyst.

She pursued a master's degree in fiction from the University of Iowa Writers' Workshop before becoming an artist in 1980. While in Iowa, she met her second husband, Chappelle Freeman Jr. The two moved to Chicago in 1967, consequently forcing her to drop out of the MFA program. While in Chicago, O’Grady operated a translation agency, specializing in seven languages. Her clients included Playboy and the Encyclopedia Britannica.

O’Grady then moved to New York in 1973, becoming a music critic for Rolling Stone and the Village Voice.

O'Grady died at her home in New York City on December 13, 2024, at the age of 90. She was eulogized by Andil Gosine as "a singular force".

== Artistic practice and career ==
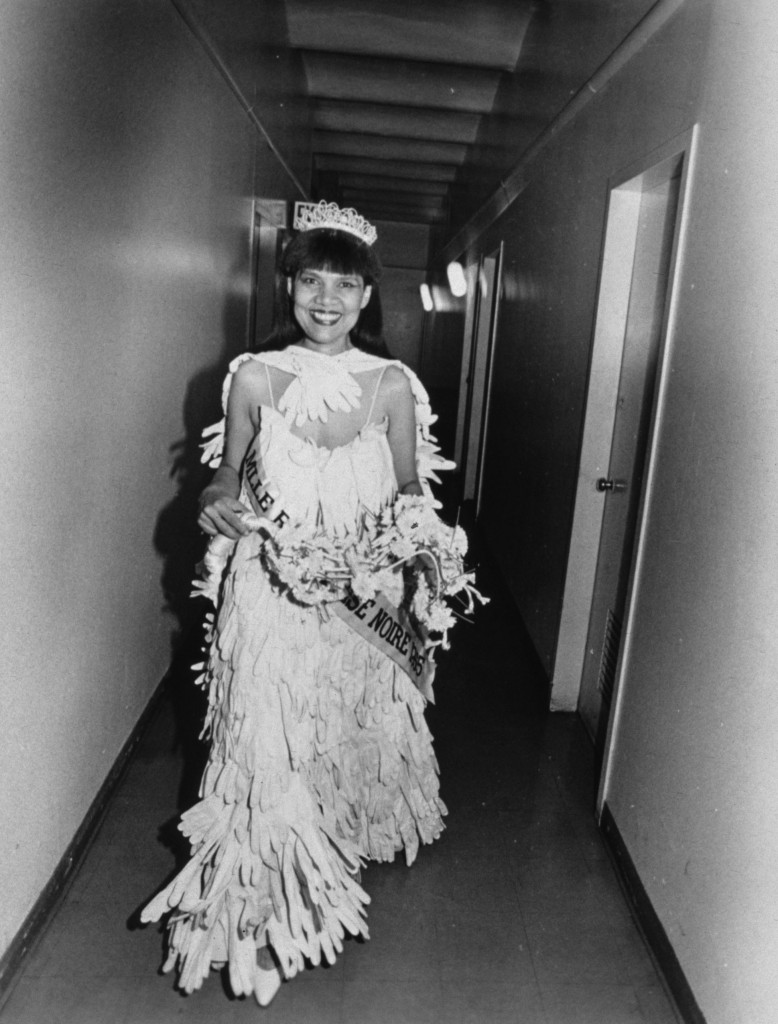
O'Grady as Mlle Bourgeoise Noire

In 1977, O’Grady began her “Cutting Out the New York Times” works: she collaged together clipped phrases from the newspaper; the rearranged words took on different meanings and formed miniature poems.

In the early 1980s, O'Grady created the persona of Mlle Bourgeoise Noire, who invaded art openings wearing a gown and a cape made of 180 pairs of white gloves, first giving away flowers, then beating herself with a white studded whip, which she often referred to as, "the whip-that-made-the-plantations-move". While doing this, she would often shout in protest poems railing against a segregated art world that excluded black individuals from the world of mainstream art, and which she perceived as not looking beyond a small circle of friends. Her first performance as Mlle Bourgeoise Noire was in 1980 at the Linda Goode Bryant's Just Above Midtown gallery in Tribeca.

O'Grady also credited Mlle Bourgeoise Noire for curating exhibitions, such as The Black and White Show in 1983 at Kenkeleba House, a black-run gallery situated in Manhattan's East Village. The concept for this event was to show the work of 30 black artists alongside that of 30 white artists. Beginning in 1991, she added photo installations to her conceptually based work.

In 1983, she choreographed a final participatory performance as Mlle Bourgeoise Noire called Art Is..., which consisted of a parade float she entered in the annual African American Day Parade in Harlem. It has become known as "O'Grady's most immediately successful piece". The float was shepherded up Adam Clayton Powell Boulevard by "O'Grady [in character as Mlle Bourgeoise Noire] and a troupe of 15 African-American and Latino performers, dressed all in white, [who] walked around the float carrying empty gold picture frames." Art critic Jillian Steinhauer described Art Is... as a float that consisted of an "empty nine-by-fifteen foot-gold-wooden wooden picture frame… O’Grady had [also] hired 15 young Black performers who walked and danced alongside it, carrying smaller golden frames that they held up before members of the crowd.” The performance not only encouraged onlookers – primarily people of color – to consider themselves art, but also drew attention to racism in the artworld. Published for the first time more than three decades later, O'Grady's photographs from the performance continue to celebrate Blackness, and to claim avant-garde art as a Black medium.

From 2015 to 2016, Art Is... was featured at the Studio Museum in Harlem, where assistant curator Amanda Hunt asserted that O’Grady's performance "affirmed the readiness of Harlem's residents to see themselves as works of art." In January 2020, four of O'Grady's Art Is... photographs were featured in Artpace’s exhibit titledVisibilities: Intrepid Women of Artpace. As a past summer 2007 International Artist-in-Residence at Artpace, O'Grady's series was included in a show celebrating female-identifying artists. The Crystal Bridges Museum of American Art argued that the event made an impact for the Black community by describing how there were people everywhere shouting things such as "That's right. That's what art is. We're the art!" and "Frame me, make me art!"

O'Grady worked on a performance in which she focused on Knights in the year 2020, with "O'Grady herself, outfitted in a custom-made, plated-steel suit of armor, poses against a black backdrop with her sword, jousting poles and ornate helmet, which in some images sprouts different varieties of palm trees". Titled Announcement of New Persona (Performances to Come!), the performance had its debut at the Brooklyn Museum.

O'Grady was profiled at the age of 88 in an article in The New Yorker magazine in September 2022.

=== Exhibitions ===
O'Grady first exhibited at the age of 45, after successful careers among others as a government intelligence analyst, literary and commercial translator, and rock critic. Her strongly feminist work has been widely exhibited, particularly in New York City and Europe. O'Grady's early Mlle Bourgeoise Noire performance was given new recognition when it was made an entry-point to the landmark exhibit WACK! Art and the Feminist Revolution, the first mainstream museum show of this groundbreaking art movement. Her practice, seemingly located at and defining the cusp between modernism and a "not-quite-post-modernist" present, has been the subject of steadily increasing interest since it received a two-article cover feature in the May 2009 issue of Artforum magazine. In December 2009, it was given a one-person exhibit in the U.S.'s most important contemporary art fair, Art Basel Miami Beach. Subsequently, O'Grady was one of 55 artists selected for inclusion in the 2010 Whitney Biennial. Her work has since featured in many seminal exhibitions, including: This Will Have Been: Art, Love & Politics in the 1980s; Radical Presence: Black Performance in Contemporary Art, and En Mas': Carnival and Performance Art of the Caribbean.

She was featured in We Wanted a Revolution: Black Radical Women 1965–85, an exhibition organized by Catherine Morris, Sackler Family Senior Curator for the Elizabeth A. Sackler Center for Feminist Art, and Rujeko Hockley, former Assistant Curator of Contemporary Art, Brooklyn Museum. The exhibit was shown at the Brooklyn Museum April 21–September 17, 2017, at the California African American Museum October 13, 2017 – January 14, 2018, and at The Institute of Contemporary Art/Boston June 27–September 30, 2018. It explores Black feminist art where the ideas come first, and then through multiple mediums including, video, sculpture, performance, photography and painting she decided which will portray her expression best. The work of each artist is placed in the historical context of cultural movements during 1965-85. She engaged frequently in dialogue with contemporary artists, such as Juliana Huxtable.

A retrospective of the artist's work, Lorraine O'Grady: Both/And, was on view at the Brooklyn Museum from March 5, 2021, to July 18, 2021. For this exhibition, she collaborated on an anthology of her writings with the art historian and critic Aruna D'Souza. Following its exhibition at the Brooklyn Museum, Both/And was on display at the Davis Museum at Wellesley College, on the campus of O'Grady's alma mater, from February 8 to June 2, 2024.

== Writings ==
O'Grady's collected writings were published by Duke University Press in 2020 and were edited with Aruna D'Souza. In addition to the articles O'Grady wrote for Artforum magazine and Art Lies, her essay "Olympia's Maid: Reclaiming Black Female Subjectivity" has been anthologized numerous times, most recently in Amelia Jones (ed.), The Feminism and Visual Culture Reader (2nd edition, Routledge, 2010). Reflecting on the great care apparent in the artist's writing, D'Souza observes: "O'Grady's words are a gift, a call to action, and a vision of a world as it could be."

=== Rock criticism ===
An early review by O'Grady of the night Bob Marley and the Wailers opened for Bruce Springsteen at Max's Upstairs in Manhattan, July 18, 1973, was rejected at the time by her Village Voice editor, who said: "It's too soon for these two." The review was first published nearly 40 years later in Max's Kansas City: Art, Glamour, Rock and Roll, 2010, a photo book with texts by O'Grady, Lou Reed, Lenny Kaye, and Danny Fields, among others, and was recently reprinted in Writing In Space.

=== "Olympia's Maid" ===
"Olympia's Maid: Reclaiming Black Female Subjectivity" is an essay originally published in 1992 in the book New Feminist Criticism: Art, Identity, Action. The first part of the essay was published in Afterimage 20 (Summer 1992). Widely referenced in scholarly works, "Olympia's Maid" is a cultural critique of the representation of Black female bodies, and the reclamation of the body as a site of black female subjectivity. On the importance of self-expression, O'Grady wrote that "to name ourselves rather than be named we must first see ourselves".

O'Grady uses the painting Olympia by Édouard Manet as an example of the Eurocentric depiction of Black womanhood. The painting features a nude prostitute, modeled by Victorine Meurent, with her black maidservant, modeled by Laure, in the background. "The image of the black female constructed in this period reflected everything the white female was not." The West, she writes, has constructed the not-white woman as unseen.

The metaphors of both the prostitute and feminist psychoanalysis' the female eunuch as a way of describing Olympia’s maid’s positionality as a Black woman are used by O'Grady. The white body of Olympia is the only object of male gaze, and Laure's inclusion is subconsciously critiqued through the reading of the white figure. In a damaging critique of the painting from when it was originally shown, Amedee Cantaloube describes as "a kind of female gorilla, a grotesque rubber figure surrounded by black, a monkey on a bed, completely nude".

"O'Grady specifically refers to a tradition of iconography of black female sexuality that casts black women as simplistic stereotypes, such as the 'Hottentot Venus,' 'Jezebel,' 'mammy,' 'Sapphire,' 'welfare queen,' and more recently 'quota queen' and 'baby mama.'" Quoting Patricia Hill Collins, Janelle Hobson states that these stereotypes are products of the systems of power, meant to control those without white skin privilege and "distort the way black women see themselves and each other". They also create the process of "unmirroring". Where mirroring in terms of psychology refers to the imitating of one by another, unmirroring refers to the process in which a subjected figure imitates the distorted image of themselves, projected by the authority of the status quo.

O’Grady references African-American artist Adrian Piper's art practice, specifically her performance Food for the Spirit (1971), as an example of the proper representation of the subjective Black nude, though this is problematic because as of September 2012, Piper has "retired from being black".

Conceptual artist Renée Greene's work Seen (1990) is also mentioned as representation based on Black female subjectivity, except according to O’Grady, the work falls short "because it is addressed more to the other than to the self" O'lGrady discusses the struggle in depicting race, identity and proper representation as a Black female artist, drawing examples from her own artwork: the politics of skin color, hair texture and facial features. In privileging a facial feature that looks a particular way over another or in pairing light and dark skin tones, hierarchies of difference are created. These hierarchies of difference exist because of historical ideologies and they have difficulty breaking down because they are supported by the preconceived importance of the whiteness in the West. O'Grady states:

"to win back that position for the African-American female will require balancing in mental solution a subversion of two objects which may appear specifically distinct: on one hand, phallocentric theory; and on the other, the lived realities of Western imperialist history"

It comes from the understanding of the structures put in place by these two theories and an overall restructuring of these theories for progress to be made. Social change cannot happen, she writes, without the reorientation of the systems that exist to subjugate Black people.

O'Grady picks out psychoanalysis as the "linchpin of Western (male) [sic] cultural theory." She quotes Jacqueline Rose's description of psychoanalysis and race: "To say that psychoanalysis does not, or cannot, refer to non-European cultures, is to constitute those cultures in total 'otherness' or 'difference'; to say, or to try to demonstrate, that it can, is to constitute them as the 'same.'"

"The creation of a black feminist aesthetic must challenge dominant culture's discourse of the black body [as] grotesque and articulate a black liberation discourse on the black body [as] beautiful." European and European-American society has historically viewed Blackness as ugly. It is up to those working within Black feminist theory and critique to reinvent a new positionality. This, O'Grady argues, comes at a time when subjectivity itself has been problematized by ideology. Ideology is a patriarchal practice and theory is what substantiates it; theories of the political and social as well as the ideological/intellectual aided in the creation of the devalued Black figure. Out of ideology, she writes, came the notion of binary logic: either/or-ism.

As a standard, the Western mode of thinking, as proposed by many feminists, is "either:or-ism". It describes two modes of thought or plans of action that can be reached, but never can the two be reached together. "The binary logic of the west takes on an added dimension when confronted with the presence of a black woman." Behind the binary logic of science in the 19th century, literature and art situates the representations of Black woman at both the site and sight of violation. Either/or logic fragments that which it is applied to. Riffing off this logical ideology, O'Grady makes mention of a contrasting Eastern mode of thinking: "both/and" logic. It describes dialogical thinking and living, implying the functioning of both options within a scenario, and suggests the abandonment of the either/or hierarchy.

== Awards ==
In 1995–96, O'Grady held the Bunting Fellowship in Visual Art at Harvard University's Radcliffe Institute for Independent Study. There, she became immersed in the internet during its early years.

In 1997–98, she was a Senior Fellow of the Vera List Center for Art and Politics, New School University. In 2009, she received the "Anonymous Was A Woman" award, a United States Artists Rockefeller Fellowship in Visual Art in 2011, the College Art Association's Distinguished Feminist Award in 2014, and a Creative Capital Award in Visual Art in 2015.

In October 2017, she received the Alumnae Achievement Award, the highest honor given to Wellesley College alumnae.

In 2024, O'Grady was awarded a Guggenheim Fellowship in Fine Arts.

== Collections ==
O'Grady's work is in the permanent collections of the Museum of Modern Art, New York; the Art Institute of Chicago, Illinois; the Brooklyn Museum, New York; the Davis Museum and Cultural Center, Wellesley, Massachusetts; the Fogg Museum at Harvard, Cambridge, Massachusetts; the Los Angeles County Museum of Art, California; the Rose Art Museum, Brandeis University, Waltham, Massachusetts; the Studio Museum in Harlem, New York; the Wadsworth Atheneum, Hartford, Connecticut; the Walker Art Center, Minneapolis, Minnesota; the Worcester Art Museum, Massachusetts, and Pérez Art Museum Miami.

== Pop culture references ==
In 2016, O'Grady was the subject of musician Anohni's video "Marrow" from the Hopelessness album.

O'Grady's Art is…, performed in 1983, was referenced in the 2020 presidential election for Joe Biden. In an article by Alex Greenberger, he argues that the artist was "a key inspiration for a video put out by Biden and Kamala Harris… [in which] in the video, [there were] shots of people of various races holding empty picture frames."

Her name appears in the lyrics of the Le Tigre song "Hot Topic".
