= Jesse Mockrin =

American artist (born 1981)

Jesse Mockrin (born 1981, Silver Spring, Maryland) is an American artist who lives and works in Los Angeles. Her work primarily consists of figurative paintings.

== Education ==
In 2003, Mockrin received her Bachelor's of Arts at Barnard College. She continued her education, and in 2011 received her MFA at the University of California, San Diego.

== Career ==
Mockrin is represented by Night Gallery in Los Angeles, where she had solo exhibitions in 2014 and 2016. Her 2016 show, titled “The Progress of Love,” included paintings inspired by Rococo and men's fashion; the resulting works demonstrated the artist's interest in “the fluidity of gender.” In November 2016, she presented a solo exhibition at Nathalie Karg Gallery in New York, titled “The Pleasures of Dance.” In March 2017, she presented a solo show titled “XOXO” at Galerie Perrotin, Seoul, in collaboration with Night Gallery, which consisted of a new series of tondo paintings depicting the K-Pop group EXO. Her work has been written about in The New Yorker, T Magazine, Modern Painters, Art Agenda, and The Paris Review, among other publications.

== Exhibitions ==
=== Solo Exhibitions ===
- Midnight sun - Night Gallery, 2014
- Progress of Love - Night Gallery, 2016
- Pleasures of the Dance- Nathalie Karg Gallery, 2016
- XOXO - Perrotin Gallery, 2017
- Syrinx - Night Gallery, 2018-2019
- Artissima- Solo presentation with Night Gallery, Turin Italy, 2019
- The marks of a stranger - Nathalie Karg Gallery, 2019
- X - Two-person exhibition with Elsa Sahal, Nathalie Karg Gallery, 2021
- Reliquary - Night Gallery, 2022
- Succession - Center of International Contemporary Art, 2022
- The Venus Effect- James Cohan Gallery, 2023
- Jesse Mockrin: Echo, Art Gallery of Ontario, 2025-2026

=== Group Exhibitions ===
- Made in Space-Night Gallery, 2013
- Made in Space - Gavin Brown’s Enterprise and Venus Over Manhattan, 2013
- Sunburn- Night Gallery, 2013
- Sargent’s Daughters- Sargent’s Daughters, 2014
- High Anxiety -Rubell Family Collection, 2016
- Engender - Kohn Gallery
- Cursives -Marinaro Gallery
- European Collection Special Presentation- Dallas Museum of Art, 2019
- The natural-Franklin Parrasch Gallery, 2019
- Endless lows, breaking high - Galerie Rolando Anselmi, 2020
- Majeure Force-Night Gallery - Night Gallery, 2020
- Human is a five letter word - Galerie Droste, 2020* A Few Small Nips - Mrs, 2022
- Singular Views : 25 Artists- Rubell Museum 2023-2024

== Awards ==
Some of her awards are as follows: In 2002, she received the Joyce Krosh Kaiser Fine Arts Grant; in 2008, the Russell Foundation Grant; and in 2009, the Alumnae Association of Barnard College Fellowship for Graduate Study.
