= Kathy Butterly =

American sculptor

Kathy Butterly is an American sculptor born in Amityville, New York, in 1963. She lives and works in New York City. Butterly received her Bachelor of Fine Arts from Moore College of Art in Philadelphia, Pennsylvania, in 1986 and her Master of Fine Arts from University of California, Davis in 1990.

== Career ==
Butterly's work consists of multi-layered glazed ceramic sculptures presented on pedestals or plinths specific to the works in question. Peter Schjeldahl has called her "today’s liveliest master of clay." Her work has been compared to that of George Ohr because of its "penchant for crumpled shapes, twisted and pinched openings." Among Butterly's vast library of visual references to historical ceramics, her particular invocation of Ohr in her "thin-walled, manipulated pieces" has also been noted by Roberta Smith. She contorts traditional ceramic forms before adding layer upon layer of glaze, even to the point of adding volume in some cases, firing the works repeatedly. Butterly is very well known for her glaze development and use of color, deploying a range of materials to achieve various finishes from translucent varnishes to puddles of neon color. She eschews large-scale formats, preferring concise compositions expressing various moods.

Major solo exhibitions include: ColorForm (2019) at Manetti Shrem Museum of Art; Thought Presence (2018) at James Cohan Gallery; Kathy Butterly- The Quality of a Line at The Armory Fair (2017); The Weight of Color at Shoshana Wayne Gallery (2015); Enter at Tibor de Nagy Gallery (2014); Freaks and Beauties: Opener 10: Kathy Butterly at The Frances Young Tang Teaching Museum. Her work was included in the 54th Carnegie International. She is represented by James Cohan Gallery in New York, and the Shoshana Wayne Gallery in Santa Monica.

In 2018, Butterly's work was included in a gift of modern ceramics by Robert A. Ellison Jr. to the Metropolitan Museum of Art.

From November 4, 2022 to March 5, 2023, the Portland Museum of Art exhibited Kathy Butterly: Out of one, many / Headscapes; an exhibition that displayed small ceramic sculptures she created over three decades.
