= Naudline Pierre =

American artist (b. 1989)

Naudline Cluvie Pierre
- Born: 1989 (age 36–37); Leominster, Massachusetts, United States
- Education: Andrews University (BFA), New York Academy of Art (MFA)
- Occupation: Visual artist
- Known for: Painting, drawing
- Website: www.naudline.com

Naudline Cluvie Pierre (born 1989), is an American visual artist working primarily in oil painting and drawing. Pierre's work incorporates traditional art historical references such as Renaissance portraiture, religious iconography, and figuration to create vibrant compositions. She lives in Brooklyn, New York.

== Early life and education ==
Naudline Pierre was born in 1989, in Leominster, Massachusetts. Pierre is the child of Haitian immigrants to the United States, her father is a church minister, and religious storytelling as well as Biblical narratives were ever-present while the artist was growing up.

Pierre received an MFA degree from the New York Academy of Art, New York City (2017), and a BFA degree from Andrews University, a Christian liberal arts school in Michigan. In a 2020 interview, Pierre elected Toni Morrison's Sula and Song of Solomon as well as Octavia E. Butler's the Parable of the Sower as influential readings.

== Work ==
In 2019, Pierre presented the solo show For I Am With You Until the End of Time at Shulamit Nazarian gallery, in Los Angeles. Her interest in Christian iconography and celestial bodies were central in the content of the exhibition.

Pierre's solo institutional solo debut What Could Be Has Not Yet Appeared took stage at the Dallas Museum of Art, Texas, in 2021. The one-person exhibition presenting nine large-scale paintings made between 2017 and 2021 touched on intimacy, the female body and care through celestial figures and altars. In the exhibition review, Frieze Magazine critic Logan Lockner places Pierre's work between Fra Angelico's frescoes and the canvases of late Afro-Cuban painter Belkis Ayón.

Pierre's inaugural exhibition in New York was at the James Cohan gallery in 2022. The exhibition Naudline Pierre: Enter the Realm occupying the two spaces the gallery owns in the Tribeca neighborhood. In the show, oil painted biblical motifs and large scale triptych panels were combined with objects. Pierre joined James Cohan gallery, New York, in 2021.

In 2023, the solo exhibition and accompanying publication This Is Not All There Is at the Drawing Center, New York, featuring her signature world-building imagery on paper, attracted extensive media attention.

The Art Gallery of Ontario in Toronto, Canada, organized the solo presentation Written in the Sky in 2023 and the large scale three-panel painting large-scale of same name produced in 2022 was acquired by the institution in 2024. According to the institutional statement, this acquisition was a joint effort between the Arts of Global Africa and the Diaspora and European Art departments.

The artist's work has been included in group exhibitions at major art events and institutions including shows at the Prospect.5, New Orleans, the Pérez Art Museum Miami, the Museum of Contemporary Art, Chicago, and at the Kemper Museum of Contemporary Art, Kansas City, Hammer Museum, Los Angeles, the California African American Museum, among others.

== Artistic practice ==
Pierre's oil paintings within her body of work are often addressed as fantastical and otherworldly due to its use of warm colors and depiction of celestial-like bodies and commentary on Western art history and vernacular of figurative painting.

In a 2019 interview for Juxtapoz Magazine, Pierre stated, "there are moments in my painting practice when I focus on a specific thought. I daydream about what I want for my life and for the lives of those I love. I cry and I laugh at memories, too. And I always, always express gratitude. I'm essentially leaving remnants of those thoughts in the paint, in the texture and in the intention of it all."

== Artworks in notable collections ==
Pierre's work has entered international museum collections in the United States and abroad.

- Close Quarters, 2018. Pérez Art Museum Miami, Florida
- Don’t You Let Me Down, Don’t You Let Me Go, 2021. Institute of Contemporary Art, Miami, Florida
- Eternal Depth of Love Divine, . Nasher Museum of Art at Duke University, North Carolina
- Lest You Fall, 2019. Dallas Museum of Art, Texas
- Soft and Fragile, 2019. Kemper Museum of Contemporary Art, MissouriSoft and Fragile, 2019. Kemper Museum of Contemporary Art, Missouri
- Though it May Hurt, Thus Shall You Grow, 2022. Brooklyn Museum, New York
- Written in the Sky, 2022. Art Gallery of Ontario, Canada

== Awards ==
Pierre was awarded a Studio Museum in Harlem Artist Residency in 2019–2020, and their work was exhibited in This Longing Vessel at MoMA PS1, a three-person show featuring the residency cohort.
