= Yun-Fei Ji =

Chinese painter (born 1963)

- Born: 1963 (age 61–62); Beijing, China
- Education: University of Arkansas, China Central Academy of Fine Arts
- Known for: Painting, scroll works, works on paper
- Awards: American Academy in Rome, Joan Mitchell Foundation, Pollock-Krasner Foundation

Yun-Fei Ji, Nine Women, mineral pigments and ink on mulberry paper, 24.5" x 54.5", 2006.

Yun-Fei Ji (Chinese: 季云飞; pinyin: Jì Yúnfēi; born 1963) is a Chinese-American painter who lives in New York City and Philadelphia. His art synthesizes old and new representational modes, subverting the classical idealism of centuries-old Chinese scroll and landscape painting traditions to tell contemporary stories of survival amid ecological and social disruption. He employs metaphor, symbolic allusion and devices such as caricature and the grotesque to create tumultuous, Kafka-esque worlds that writers suggest address two cultural revolutions: the first, Communist one and its spiritual repercussions, and a broader capitalist one driven by industrialization and its effects, both in China and the U.S. ARTnews critic Lilly Wei wrote, "Ancestral ghosts and skeletons appear frequently in Ji’s iconography; his work is infused with the supernatural and the folkloric as well as the documentary as he records with fierce, focused intensity the displacement and forced relocation of people, the disappearance of villages, and the environmental upheavals of massive projects like the controversial Three Gorges Dam."

Institutions that Ji has exhibited in included the Museum of Modern Art (MoMA), S.M.A.K. (Ghent), the Whitney Museum, Brooklyn Museum and New Museum, among others. He been awarded the American Academy in Rome Prize, and his work belongs to the art collections of MoMA, the Metropolitan Museum of Art, British Museum, Whitney Museum and Philadelphia Museum of Art.

He is represnted by James Cohan Gallery in New York City.

== Early life and career ==
Ji was born in 1963 in Beijing, China, the son of an army doctor. He grew up amid the decade-long Cultural Revolution (1966–1976), during which his mother was sent to a labor camp for re-education. For those two years he was cared for by his grandparents, who introduced him to calligraphy and ghost stories, both of which have figured in his art; at age ten, he began studies with a military officer who created illustrations for the People's Liberation Army. Ji attended the Central Academy of Fine Arts in Beijing (BFA, 1982), learning oil painting in the still state-sanctioned style of Socialist realism; he was among the first generation to study there after its post-Cultural Revolution reopening.

After graduating, Ji taught for two years at the School of Arts and Crafts in Beijing and secretly studied calligraphy and classical painting in the imperial Song dynasty tradition—both of which were considered bourgeois, obsolete and forbidden. In 1986 he emigrated after winning a Fulbright scholarship to study at the University of Arkansas, where he earned an MFA in 1989. In the U.S., he discovered the German Expressionists and Philip Guston, and integrated elements of their humor and stylized figures into his scroll-style watercolor and ink works.

Ji moved to New York in 1990. Between 1997 and 2004, his work began receiving wider attention through group exhibitions at the Bronx Museum and Aldrich Museum of Contemporary Art, the 2002 Whitney Biennial, and solo shows at Pierogi, Pratt Manhattan Gallery and Contemporary Art Museum St. Louis.

In his later career, Ji has had solo exhibitions at UCCA Center for Contemporary Art (Beijing, 2012), the Wellin Museum of Art (2016), Cleveland Museum of Art (2016) and Kalamazoo Institute of Arts (2021), as well as the James Cohan Gallery (New York, 2006–present) and Zeno X Gallery (Antwerp, 2003–present). He also exhibited in the Lyon Biennale (2011), Biennale of Sydney (2012), Prospect New Orleans (2014), Shanghai Biennale (2014), and the surveys "Displacement: The Three Gorges Dam and Contemporary Chinese Art," (Smart Museum of Art, 2008), "Medals of Dishonour" (British Museum, 2009), and "Show and Tell: Stories in Chinese Paintings" (Metropolitan Museum of Art, 2018).

== Work and reception ==
Ji draws upon personal, historical, cultural and political sources for inspiration: his memories of Maoist rule, classical and folk art, literature and deep research into instances of human displacement and environmental destruction in the name of modernization. For most of his career, he has worked in the scroll-painting traditions of the Tang, Song and Yuan dynasties, using ink, mineral pigments and brushes on xuan paper and washi paper. His paintings often have the weathered, crinkled and creased look of premature age, making a sense of the passage of time physically tangible. He characteristically paints with a wide range of marks derived from observations of nature: supple brushstrokes and line, mottled areas, abstract drips and precise evocations of rock, water, flora and fauna. Compositionally, he employs dissonant perspectives and shifts in scale that undercut the consistency of landscapes, narrative flow, or simple interpretations.

Into these classical approaches Ji has introduced expressionistic figurative modes that have been likened to artists such as George Grosz and James Ensor. His work often derives impact from deliberate juxtapositions of anachronistic techniques and symbols—flattened and stacked perspective, idyllic settings, ghost-like characters inspired by folktales—with contemporary elements such as abstraction and modern events, buildings and technologies. Critics have described the resulting sociopolitical critiques as multilayered, disturbing and fantastical, compassionate, satirical and blackly humorous. John Yau characterized Yi as "a chronicler with a novelist's eye for rich, reverberating detail," whose work evokes the contradictions, ruptures and elisions of both "rapid, irrevocable change and tradition's glacial pace … with immense tenderness and inconsolable mourning."

=== Works and exhibitions, 2001–10 ===
Yun-Fei Ji, The Village and its Ghosts, ink and watercolor on Xian paper, 15.75" x 684.25", 2014. Installation View at Prospect.3:, Contemporary Arts Center New Orleans.

Ji's painting in early solo exhibitions at Pierogi (2001) and Pratt Manhattan (2003) resembled friezelike, all-over fields whose ruptured decorative backdrops and landscapes revealed calamitous scenes of disaster and decay, populated by Goyaesque figures in grotesque masks and costumes. Artforum's Michael Wilson wrote that this work (e.g., Wedding Ballad, 2002) "conjured a world in turmoil that oscillates between the safety of centuries-old tradition and [present-day] mortal terror."

Throughout the 2000s, Ji rooted surreal allegories of modernization in field research he conducted on communities affected by man-made and natural disasters. These included entire Chinese villages involuntarily dislodged by colossal hydroelectric projects and Hurricane Katrina-ravaged New Orleans, which he connected through the theme of government failure. The "Empty City" paintings (Contemporary Art Museum St. Louis, 2004) centered on the Chinese Three Gorges Dam project, specifically, its displacement of an estimated 1,500,000 people (largely minorities) and submergence of thousands of villages and significant archaeological sites, forever altering both landscape and culture. His fractured, panoramic scrolls (e.g., Empty City—calling the dead, 2003) presented multiple perspectives and self-contained vignettes that moved between past, present and future, refusing any easy message.

In exhibitions at James Cohan Gallery ("Water That Floats the Boat Can Also Sink It," 2007; "Mistaking Each Other for Ghosts," 2010), Ji's epic, cautionary scrolls delved further into the project, portraying migration in physical and psychic terms that emphasized loss and a literal haunting of those supplanted by melancholic wraiths and scraggly scavengers (e.g., Last Days Before the Flood, 2006). In the latter show, Ji was inspired by the ghost stories of the 18th-century Chinese writer Pu Songling and the French writer, Marquis de Sade, in several works linking Sade's decadent noblemen to contemporary Chinese political leaders. The show included the ten-foot-wide horizontal scroll, Migrants of the Three Gorges Dam (2009), which was hand-printed from 500 carved woodblocks. It portrayed dispossessed farmers and flooded landscapes alongside calligraphic reports and descriptions of the flooding of the Yangtze River based on Ji's own research, interviews and observations.

=== Later exhibitions ===
Yun-Fei Ji, Bunk Bed, acrylic on canvas, 24" x 30", 2022.

Ji's survey "The Intimate Universe" (Wellin Museum, 2016) and exhibition "Rumors, Ridicules, and Retributions" (James Cohan, 2018) presented more than a decade's work, ranging from sketch studies to his first sculptures (skeletal figures made from paper pulp) to finished paintings and monumental scrolls. The scrolls included the cinematic, nearly 60-foot-long The Village and its Ghosts (2014) and the ironically titled Village Wen’s Progress (2017). Both offered a sense of perpetual transition and history repeating itself through an amalgam of settings and signifiers: the devastation of New Orleans, migrants piled with their meager, worldly goods, details of the Nan Shui Bei Diao megaproject, and scenes of Columbus Park in Manhattan. The imagery of Village Wen’s Progress functioned both literally and symbolically, with collapsing scaffolding, ominous ever-present ghosts and thematic movement from mundane drudgery to hallucinatory chaos that related physical dislocation to mental disintegration. The New York Times called these works subversive in their contradictions, while Artcritical's Robert C. Morgan wrote "Ji draws intentionally and purposefully on the past as a means to exorcise the hidden realities of the present … the brush becomes an indirect signifier of revolt."

Critics noted a significant turn in Ji's exhibition, "The Sunflower Turned Its Back" (James Cohan Gallery, 2022), toward new imagery (flowers, a portrait) and a new medium (acrylic on canvas) that further conveyed the global, universal nature of his subject matter. Stylistically less caricatured or expressionist, these works were painted in thickly applied, dry, chalky colors that exploited the saturation and opacity of acrylic and created interplay between abstraction and representation, flat pattern and volumetric form. In paintings such as Bunk Bed or Satellite Dish on a Bed (both 2023), New Yorker critic Johanna Fateman noted juxtapositions of "dappled light and dynamic clutter [recalling] early Matisse" with the disarray of jumbled belongings on streets and hasty departures, which created tonal shifts between gaiety and gravitas.

== Collections and awards ==
Ji's work belongs to the public art collections of the Asia Society Museum, Baltimore Museum of Art, The British Museum, Brooklyn Museum, Cleveland Museum of Art, Grand Rapids Art Museum, Hammer Museum, Metropolitan Museum of Art, Milwaukee Art Museum, Museum of Modern Art, Norton Museum of Art, Philadelphia Museum of Art, Rose Art Museum, Smart Museum of Art, Toledo Museum of Art, US Department of State, Virginia Museum of Fine Arts, Whitney Museum, and Worcester Art Museum, among others.

He has received fellowships from the American Academy in Rome (Rome Prize, 2005), Sharp Foundation (2004), MoMA PS1 (2003) and Bronx Museum (1996), and grants from the New York Foundation for the Arts (1999), Joan Mitchell Foundation (1998) and Pollock-Krasner Foundation (1997). Ji has been awarded artist residencies by Parasol Unit Foundation for Contemporary Art, Headlands Center for the Arts, Art Omi, Millay Colony for the Arts, Ucross Foundation, Banff Centre for Arts and Creativity and MacDowell, among others.

== Publications ==
- Adler, Tracy L., Robert C. Morgan & Stephen J. Goldberg, Yun-Fei Ji: The Intimate Universe, Prestel Publishing, New York, 2016, ISBN 9783791355634
- Cox, Jessica Lin, Christopher Rawson, & Leo Xu, Yun-Fei Ji: Mistaking Each Other for Ghosts, James Cohan Gallery, 2010 ISBN 0-9675300-8-3
- Chiu, Melissa, Tan Lin, Gregory Volk, Paul Ha & Yun-Fei Ji, Yun-Fei Ji: The Empty City, Shannon Fitzgerald Contemporary Art Museum St. Louis, 2005 ISBN 0971219532
- Tsai, Paula, Yun-Fei Ji: Water Work, Ucca Books, Beijing, 2013 ISBN 9789881622341
