= The Fighting Temptations =

- Theatrical release poster
- Directed by: Jonathan Lynn
- Written by: Elizabeth Hunter; Saladin K. Patterson
- Produced by: David Gale; Loretha C. Jones; Benny Medina; Jeff Pollack
- Starring: Cuba Gooding Jr.; Beyoncé Knowles; Mike Epps; Latanya Richardson
- Cinematography: Affonso Beato
- Edited by: Paul Hirsch
- Music by: Jimmy Jam; Terry Lewis; James Wright
- Production companies: MTV Films; Handprint Films
- Distributed by: Paramount Pictures
- Release date: September 19, 2003
- Running time: 123 minutes
- Country: United States
- Language: English
- Budget: $30 million
- Box office: $32.7 million

The Fighting Temptations is a 2003 American musical comedy film directed by Jonathan Lynn, written by Elizabeth Hunter and Saladin K. Patterson, and distributed by Paramount Pictures and MTV Films. Cuba Gooding Jr. plays a man who returns to his hometown in Georgia and attempts to revive a church choir in order to enter a gospel competition, with the help of his childhood friend, played by Beyoncé Knowles.

The film is notable for its soundtrack and ensemble cast. The film received mixed reviews upon release.

== Plot ==
In 1980, Beulah Baptist Church choir singer Mary Ann Hill is found singing secular R&B music in her fictional hometown of Monte Carlo, Georgia. Though supported by choir leader – and her aunt – Sally Walker, Mary Ann is exiled from the choir and town by the self-righteous Paulina Pritchett, and leaves with her son Darrin Hill to pursue her dream of singing professionally. However, Mary Ann is killed in a traffic accident when Darrin is a teenager. As an adult, Darrin works as a New York City advertising executive, but is dogged by financial problems and a habit of lying that eventually results in his termination. Subsequently tracked down by a private investigator, Darrin learns that Sally has died, and returns to Monte Carlo for her funeral. He befriends local cab driver Lucious and meets Beulah’s pastor, and Paulina’s brother, Reverend Paul Lewis.

Sally’s will leaves Darrin $150,000 of stock in the company producing the annual “Gospel Explosion” competition on the condition he leads the choir to victory in the competition, which itself carries a prize of $10,000. Confronted by a small, poorly trained choir still dominated by Paulina, Darrin lies that he has enjoyed success as a music producer in New York City, and recruits new members with false promises that he will share the prize money. He also reconnects with his childhood friend and crush Lilly, who was also ostracized for being a nightclub singer, and having a son out of wedlock, Dean. Though initially apprehensive, Lilly eventually joins the choir and becomes its new lead singer.

Several weeks later, Paulina reveals Darrin had not entered the choir into the auditions on time. The audition judge, Luther Washington, who is also the town's prison warden, agrees to accept their late entry if they perform for the prison, and also allows several incarcerated men to join the choir. Darrin and Lilly unexpectedly begin guiding the choir to success and local respect, and also begin renewing their romantic feelings for each other. However, when Paulina learns of Darrin’s lies, she exposes him to the congregation, leading to Lilly spurning him and the choir members rejecting his leadership. Darrin quits and returns to New York City, where he has been offered his job back with a promotion, and Paulina assumes leadership of the choir.

Leading an advertising pitch for an alcoholic beverage with imagery inspired by Monte Carlo, Darrin realizes his affluent life means nothing to him without the purpose and love he found in his hometown. Darrin returns to Monte Carlo and reconciles with Lilly; joined by Lucious and Reverend Lewis, the group tries to rejoin the choir at the Gospel Explosion. Paulina attempts to exclude the four, but is met with resistance when Lilly scolds her for insulting Sally’s wishes and Reverend Lewis exposes her as a liar whose husband left her when he tired of her judgmental behavior and married another woman. They convince the rest to oust Paulina, giving Darrin back his position.

Before taking the stage, Darrin tells Lilly she inspired him to name the choir “The Fighting Temptations” as she inspired him to leave his vices behind and live a values-driven life. With their powerful performance, the choir wins the competition. Before ending his acceptance speech, Darrin surprises Lilly with a marriage proposal, which she accepts. Eighteen months later, the two are happily married with a baby of their own; under their leadership, the choir's reputation has grown Beulah’s congregation so much the church will soon be expanding. Having learned from the examples set by the other choir members, Paulina returns to the choir and joins in the harmony.

== Cast ==
- Cuba Gooding Jr. as Darrin Hill
  - Nigel Washington as Young Darrin
- Beyoncé Knowles as Lilly
  - Chloe Bailey as Young Lilly
- Mike Epps as Lucious
- Faith Evans as Mary Ann Hill
- Steve Harvey as Miles Smoke (Local Radio DJ)
- Wendell Pierce as Reverend Paul Lewis
- LaTanya Richardson as Paulina Lewis-Pritchett
- Dave Sheridan as Bill the Mechanic
- Angie Stone as Alma
- Rue McClanahan as Nancy Stringer
- Melba Moore as Bessie Cooley
- Reverend Shirley Caesar as Herself
- Montell Jordan as Mr. Johnson (Convict #1)
- T-Bone as Bee-Z Biggs (Convict #2)
- Dakin Matthews as Mr. Fairchild
- Lou Myers as Homer T.
- Mickey Jones as Scooter
- Zane Copeland Jr. as Derek
- Ann Nesby as Sally Walker
- Lourdes Benedicto as Rosa Lopez
- Mitchah Williams as Jimmy B.
- Eddie LeVert Sr. as Joseph
- Walter Williams Sr. as Frank
- Eric Nolan Grant as Samuel
- Rosalie Washington as Faye Jenkins
- James E. Gaines as Lilly's Grandfather
- Darrell Vanterpool as Dean
- Chris Cole as Lightfoot (Convict #3)
- Mae Middleton as Tasha
- Faizon Love as Luther Washington (Prison Warden)
- Wilbur Fitzgerald as L&G Representative

=== Cameos ===
- The Blind Boys of Alabama as Themselves
- Mary Mary as Themselves
- Ramiyah as Themselves
- Donnie McClurkin as Judge of Gospel Explosion (Himself)
- Yolanda Adams as Judge of Gospel Explosion (Herself)
- Daphne Duplaix as Tiffany, Darrin's girlfriend
- NeNe Leakes as Strip Club Dancer

== Production ==
The film crew used several locations throughout Georgia. The final scene was filmed in Columbus, GA at the RiverCenter for the Performing Arts. Several of the extras were local residents of Columbus, GA. Ken Kwapis had previously been attached to direct.

== Reception ==
=== Critical response ===
On the review aggregator website Rotten Tomatoes, 42% of 109 critics' reviews are positive, with an average rating of 5.3/10. The website's consensus reads: "The music is the only saving grace in this predictable and eager-to-please comedy." Metacritic, which uses a weighted average, assigned the film a score of 53 out of 100, based on 32 critics, indicating "mixed or average" reviews. Audiences polled by CinemaScore gave the film an average grade of "A" on an A+ to F scale.

The music of the film received acclaim, most notably, Beyoncé's cover of "Fever", while the film itself was criticized for its screenplay, rehashed premise and lack of chemistry between actors Gooding and Knowles. Ebert & Roeper reviewed the film and Roger Ebert gave it thumbs up.

=== Box office ===
The Fighting Temptations grossed $30.3 million domestically (United States and Canada), and $3.7 million in other territories, for a worldwide total of $34 million, against a budget of $30 million. It opened at No. 3 in the weekend domestic box office, and spent its first four weeks in the Top 10.

== Soundtrack ==
The soundtrack album The Fighting Temptations (Music From The Motion Picture) accompanied the film and was released by Music World / Columbia / Sony Music on September 9, 2003.

== Cancelled sequel ==
In a 2003 interview, Mickey Jones – who had a supporting role in the film – stated that he hoped the film performed well because all of the principal actors had signed on for a sequel.

== Awards and nominations ==
| Award | Recipients | Category | Result | Ref. |
|---|---|---|---|---|
| BET Comedy Awards | Beyoncé Knowles | Outstanding Actress in a Box-Office Movie | Nominated | |
| BET Comedy Awards | Mike Epps | Outstanding Supporting Actor in a Box-Office Movie | Nominated | |
| Black Reel Awards | Beyoncé Knowles | Best Actress | Nominated | |
| Black Reel Awards | Elizabeth Hunter; Saladin K. Patterson | Best Screenplay Original or Adapted | Nominated | |
| Black Reel Awards | | Best Film | Nominated | |
| Black Reel Awards | | Best Film Soundtrack | Won | |
| Black Reel Awards | "He Still Loves Me" | Best Film Song | Won | |
| Golden Raspberry Awards | Cuba Gooding Jr. | Worst Actor | Nominated | |
| Image Awards | | Outstanding Motion Picture | Won | |
| Image Awards | Beyoncé Knowles | Outstanding Actress in a Motion Picture | Nominated | |
