= Colin Robinson (activist) =

Trinidad and Tobago social justice advocate (1961–2021)

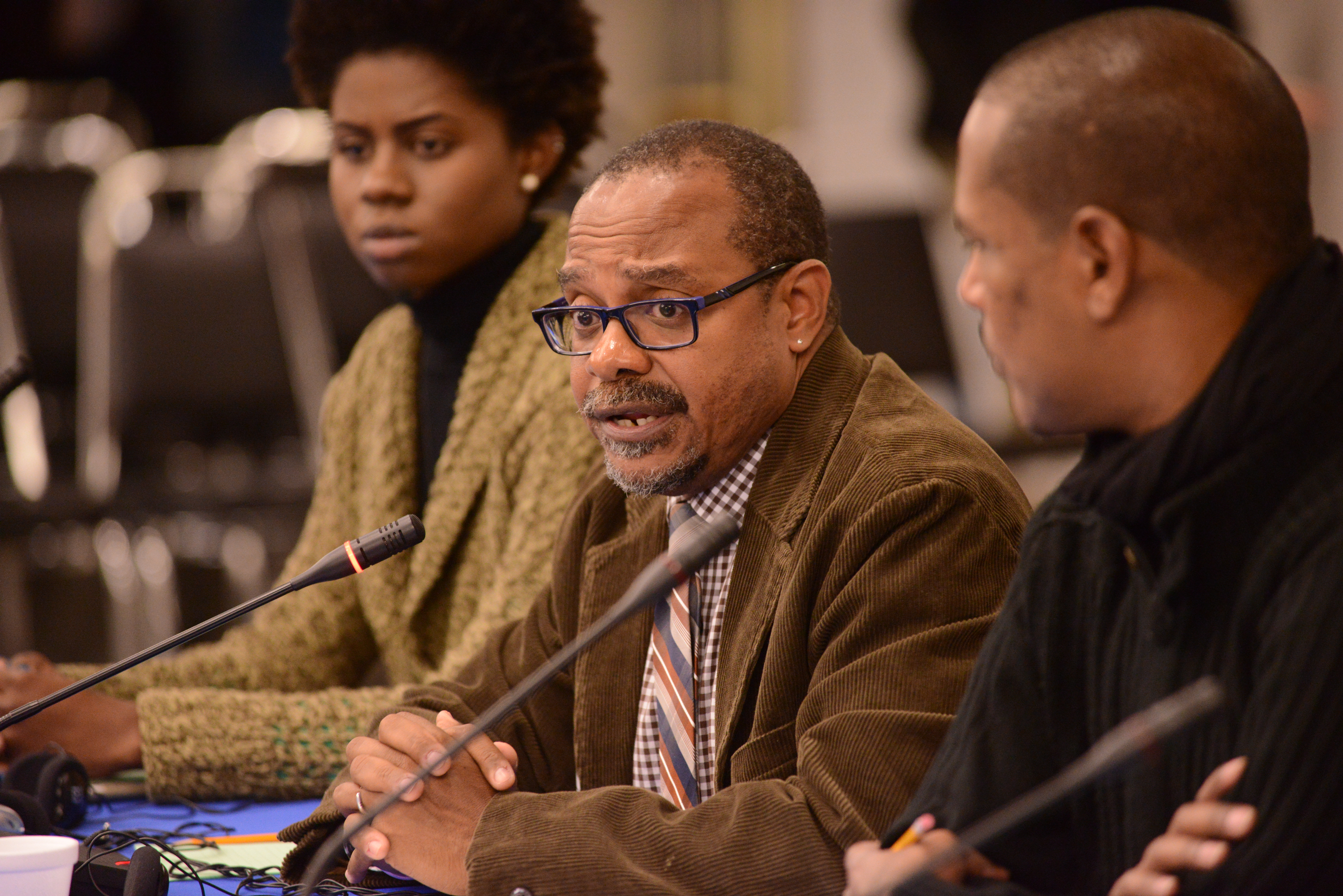
- Born: October 6, 1961; Trinidad and Tobago
- Died: March 4, 2021 (aged 59); Washington, D.C.
- Education: New York University, The New School
- Organization(s): Audre Lorde Project, Gay Men's Health Crisis, New York State Black Gay Network

Colin Robinson (October 8, 1961 – March 4, 2021) was a social justice advocate from Trinidad and Tobago. Robinson's advocacy focused on LGBT+ issues, HIV policy, and health and gender justice.

== Early life and education ==
Colin McNeil Robinson was born on October 8, 1961, to Josceline Stewart-Robinson, an elementary school principal, and Carlton Robinson, a financial manager. He was one of four children, and grew up in Diego Martin and Port of Spain in Trinidad. He graduated from St. Mary's College in 1979, and was awarded a national scholarship in modern languages, which he used to attend Yale University in 1980. He attended Yale for one semester before dropping out and moving to New York City, where he transferred to New York University and studied intermittently beginning in 1981. Robinson completed his degree in anthropology in 1988 and later received a master's degree in health policy and management from the New School.

== Career and activism ==
Upon moving to New York, Robinson found a community among other Black and queer men and women, and became associated with writers and activists such as Essex Hemphill, Ray Melrose, Ron Simmons, Steven Fullwood, Assotto Saint, and Joseph Beam. In 1984, he joined Blackheart Collective, a queer writers' group with members such as Audre Lorde, and served as the editor for the collective's journal. In 1986, Robinson was a news correspondent for Beam's literary magazine, Black/Out and worked extensively for Other Countries, the writing workshop that emerged from Blackheart Collective. In the same year, Charles Angel founded Gay Men of African Descent, with Robinson as the co-chair of the organization. He contributed writing and poetry to Other Countries: Black Gay Voices (1988), Beyond Homophobia: Centring LGBTQ Experience in the Anglophone Caribbean (2020),

Robinson's work in the 1990s largely focused on HIV/AIDs education and prevention with the Gay Men's Health Crisis. In 1994, Robinson and John Manzon-Santos founded the Audre Lorde Project. Around 1997, he founded Caribbean Pride to address the erasure of the immigrant experience in queer movements. From 1998 to 2003, he served as the co-chair of the International Gay and Lesbian Human Rights Commission (IGLHRC).

From 2001 to 2006, Robinson served as the executive director for the New York State Black Gay Network, and helped organize protests against the blackface performances of Shirley Q. Liquor, who performed at gay clubs and had been defended by RuPaul. In 2007, Robinson returned to Trinidad to continue his work supporting LGBTQ Caribbean communities. He founded the Coalition Advocating for Sexual Inclusion (CAISO) in 2009, and served as the executive director until his death. In 2020, CAISO established the Colin Robinson Hard Head Award, which recognizes leaders in equal rights movements. He also co-founded the Caribbean Forum for Liberation and Acceptance of Genders and Sexualities. He was among the first to openly campaign for LGBT+ rights in Trinidad and Tobago and the Caribbean, and initiated the Anti-Violence Project with an early goal of protesting Buju Banton. Robinson was also known for his poetry and his work is considered to be part of the canon of queer Caribbean poetry; in 2016, he published a poetry collection, You Have You Father Hard Head. He contributed writing and poetry to journals and anthologies such as Other Countries: Black Gay Voices (1988), Beyond Homophobia: Centring LGBTQ Experience in the Anglophone Caribbean (2020), Calabash: A Journal of Caribbean Arts and Letters, and Corpus: An HIV Prevention Publication. Robinson also wrote a weekly column for the Trinidad and Tobago Newsday.

Robinson died of colon cancer on March 4, 2021, in Washington, D.C., at age 58. An exhibit of art inspired by his life was curated by Andil Gosine at the Leslie-Lohman Musem of Art in 2024.
