= Xu Zhen =

Chinese artist

Xu Zhen (Chinese 徐震)
- Born: 1977 (age 48–49)
- Education: Shanghai Arts & Crafts Institute

Xu Zhen (Chinese 徐震), born in 1977 in Shanghai, China, is a multimedia artist. Xu Zhen's body of work, which includes photography, installation art and video, entails theatrical humour and social critique. His projects are informed by performance and conceptual art. Xu's work focuses on human sensitivity and dramatizes the humdrum of urban living.

== Biography ==
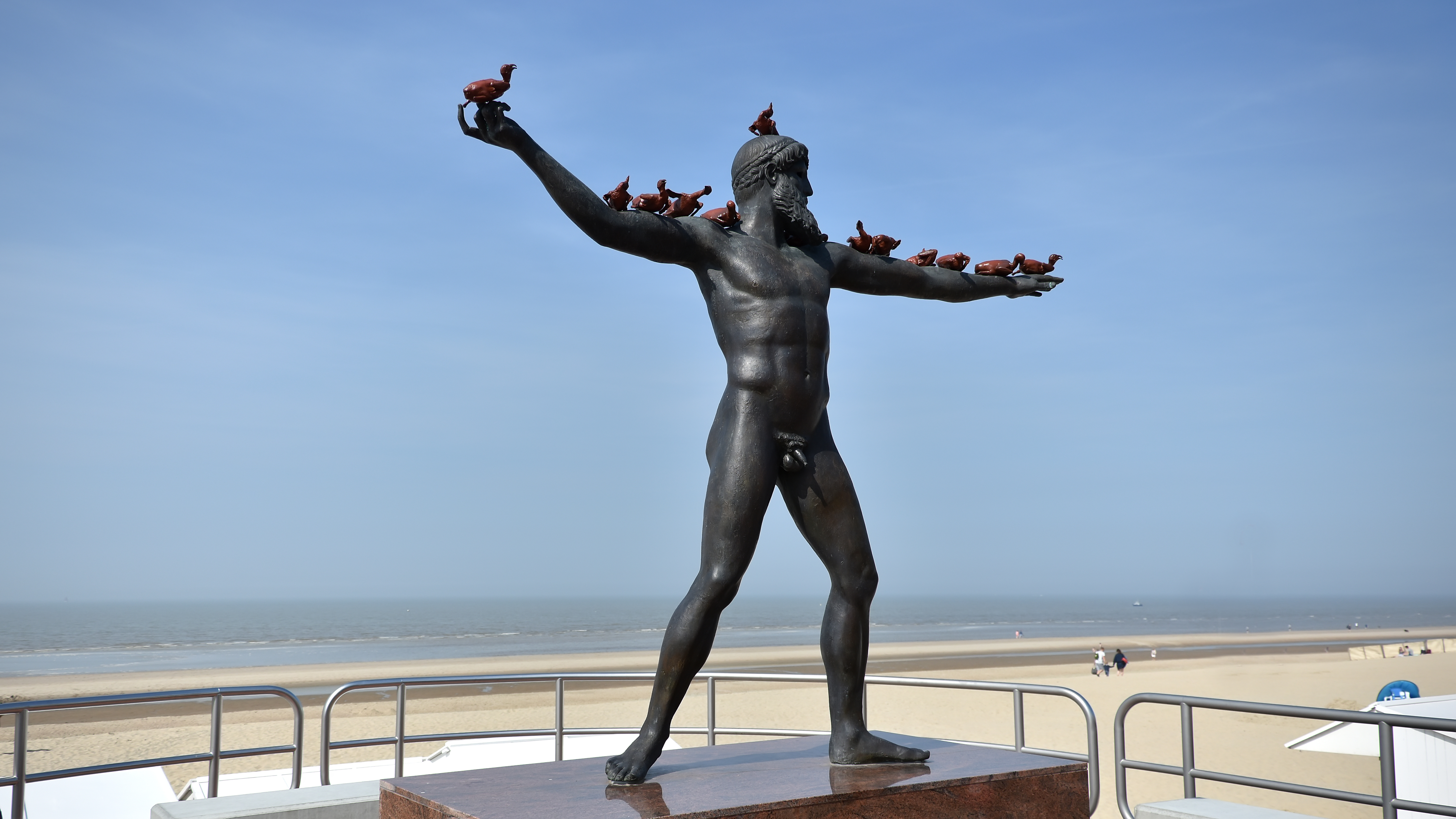
Eternity-Poseidon by Xu Zhen in De Haan, Belgium

Xu Zhen's earlier representative individual works includes the video, Rainbow (1998), which is presented at the 49th Venice Biennial in 2001, displays a whipped naked back turning redder without showing the hand or person beating the figure. The video Shout (2005) exhibited in the first China Pavilion at the 51st Venice Biennial is one of the most representative works in Xu's career according to the art critic Barbara Pollack. As the artist screams on the crowded streets of Shanghai, the lens captures the frightful and bewildered faces of pedestrians momentarily disrupted.

The installation ShanghART Supermarket (2007) recreates a convenience store on-site: the shelves are crammed full of empty products, while the items, sold at their ordinarily marked prices, only have the external shells of their packaging.

His recent pieces survey ancient and new art while fusing Chinese and Western cultures into large scale installations or into new art forms. European Thousand-Hand Classical Sculpture (2014) assembles 19 different Western classical sculptures of various forms; borrowing from the shape of the Thousand-Hand Guanyin (Bodhisattva) in Buddhist iconography. Physique of Consciousness (2011) is a video which comprises movements derived from dance, gymnastics, spiritual and cultural rituals.

== Curation ==
Xu Zhen's curatorial experiments and engagement with an alternative art space, BizArt (closed in 2010), complement and extend practice. Aside from being an artist, Xu Zhen organizes various art activities and co-curates with other artists. Major exhibitions in Shanghai include Art For Sale (1999); Fan Mingzhen & Fan Mingzhu (2002); Dial 62761232-Courier Exhibition (2004); 38 Solo Exhibitions (2006); The Real Thing: Contemporary from Art China (2007), Tate Liverpool; Bourgeoisified Proletariat (2009); and My Communism – Poster Exhibition (2011). He was also one of the creators of the online contemporary art forum, Art-Ba-Ba, in 2006.

== Museum and Biennale Exhibition ==
Xu Zhen has exhibited internationally at museums and biennales, such as, Venice Biennale (2001, 2005), Lyon Biennial (2013), Asia Pacific Triennial (2012), Guangzhou Triennial (2012), The Museum of Modern Art (New York, 2004), ICP (2004), Mori Art Museum (2005), PS1 (2006), Tate Liverpool (2007) etc. Recent exhibitions include Corporate-Xu Zhen (Produced by MadeIn Company), Kunsthaus Graz (Graz, Austria, 2015), Xu Zhen Solo Exhibition, Long Museum (Shanghai, China, 2015), Xu Zhen-Produced by MadeIn Company, Ullens Centre for Contemporary Art (Beijing, China, 2014), 14 Rooms, Foundation Beyeler (Basel, Switzerland, 2014), Art of Change (Hayward Gallery, London, 2012), 11 Rooms (Manchester International Festival, Manchester City Galleries, 2011), 15 Rooms, Long Museum (Shanghai, China, 2015), Corporate, Graz Kunsthaus, (Graz, Austria, 2015), Bentu: Chinese Artists in a Time of Turbulence and Transformation, and Foundation Louis Vuitton (Paris, France, 2016) etc.

Xu Zhen won the prize for ‘Best Artist’ at the China Contemporary Art Award in 2004 and ‘Best Artist of the Year’ at the AAC Award in 2014.

His work has been collected by many institutions and private collections worldwide including the Foundation Louis Vuitton, Paris, the Centre Pompidou, Paris, the Daimler Collection (Berlin, Germany), The White Rabbit Collection (Chippendale, Australia), the Rubell Famil Collection, (Miami, USA), the Musée d'Art Contemporain de Lyon (Lyon, France), the K11 (Shanghai) Collection, the DSL Collection, among others.

== MadeIn Company ==
In 2009, Xu Zhen founded ‘MadeIn Company,’ a contemporary art creation corporate that plays off of the phrase "Made in China". In 2013, MadeIn Company launched the brand "Xu Zhen" and led MadeIn to expand into curatorial production, research and publications.

In 2014, MadeIn Company founded MadeIn Gallery, a gallery dedicated to the promotion of international artists with an accent on contemporary culture development and communication. Located in M50 Shanghai contemporary art district, MadeIn Gallery aims to be a platform for creativity in China, giving access to the latest artworks of established artists as well as younger and lesser-known talents. MadeIn Gallery was featured in the China Focus Section of the Armory Show in New York in March 2014. On this occasion, detailed images of the series Under Heaven by Xu Zhen, commissioned artist of the Armory, were featured in all the visual promotional materials.

== Selected solo exhibitions ==
2015

- Corporate, Graz Kunsthaus, Graz, Austria
- In Light Of 25 Years – One of Us Is On the Wrong Side of History!, Witte de With, Rotterdam, The Netherlands
- Xu Zhen Solo Exhibition, Long Museum, Shanghai, China

2014

- Xu Zhen-Produced by MadeIn Company: Blissful As Gods, ShanghART Gallery, Shanghai, China
- Careful Don’t Get Dirty, Patrick Waldburger Gallery, Brussels, Belgium
- Prey, Galerie Nathalie Obadia, Paris, France
- Xu Zhen-Produced by MadeIn Company, ShanghART Singapore, Singapore
- Xu Zhen-A MadeIn Company Production, Ullens Center for Contemporary Art, Beijing, China

2013

- The Most Important Thing Is Not the Contract, OCT, Shanghai, China
- Turbulent, Bund 18 Temporary Space, Shanghai China
- Movement Field – Xu Zhen Solo Exhibition, produced by MadeIn Company, Long March Space, Beijing China
- Offsite：MadeIn Company, Vancouver Art Gallery, Vancouver, Canada

2012

- Forbidden Castle, Muzeum Montanelli, Prague, Czech Republic
- MadeIn Company, Minsheng Art Museum, Shanghai, China
- Sleeping Life Away, Galerie Nathalie Obadia, Paris, France
- The Last Few Mosquitos, WHERE? , Vancouver Canada

2011

- Action of Consciousness, ShanghART Gallery & H Space, Shanghai
- Physique of Consciousness, Long March Space, Beijing
- Physique of Consciousness, Kunsthalle Bern, Bern, Switzerland

2010

- Don’t Hang Your Faith on The Wall, Long March Space, Beijing
- Seeing One's Own Eyes, IKON Gallery, Birmingham, UK
- There are new species! What do you suppose they are called? , Fabien Fryns Fine Art, Los Angeles, U.S.
- Spread-by MadeIn, ShanghART Beijing, Beijing, China

2009

- Spread—New Exhibition Produced by MadeIn, ShanghART at Huaihai Rd 796, Shanghai, China
- MadeIn -- Seeing One's Own Eyes europalia.china, S.M.A.K., Gent, Belgium
- Lonely Miracle: Middle East Contemporary Art Exhibition, James Cohan Gallery, New York, USA
- Seeing One's Own Eyes—Middle East Contemporary Art Exhibition-Space, ShanghART Gallery and ShanghART H-Space, Shanghai
- The Last Few Mosquitos, Ikon Gallery, Birmingham, UK

2008

- Impossible is Nothing, Long March Space, Beijing, China
- Xu Zhen, Folkert de Jong, Martha Colburn, James Cohan Gallery, New York
- Just Did It, James Cohan Gallery, New York

2007

- In Just the Blink of an Eye, James Cohan Gallery with PERFORMA, New York
- Art '38 Basel, Art Unlimited-Xu Zhen 18 Days (at B3), Art Fair Switzerland

2006

- 8848 – 1.86, ShanghART H-Space, Shanghai
- 8848 – 1.86, Museum Boijmans Van Beuningen, Rotterdam, The Netherlands
- An Animal, 2577 Longhua Road, Xuhui district, Shanghai

2002

- Careful, Don't Get Dirty, Galerie Waldburger, Berlin, Germany
- A Young Man, Bizart, Shanghai
