= Gay Men of African Descent =

Gay Men of African Descent (GMAD) is the largest and oldest African American organization dedicated exclusively to the well being of Black gay men. GMAD was founded in 1986 in New York City by the Reverend Charles Angel. The group worked to address the unique issues to Black gay men in America through educational, social, and political mobilization.

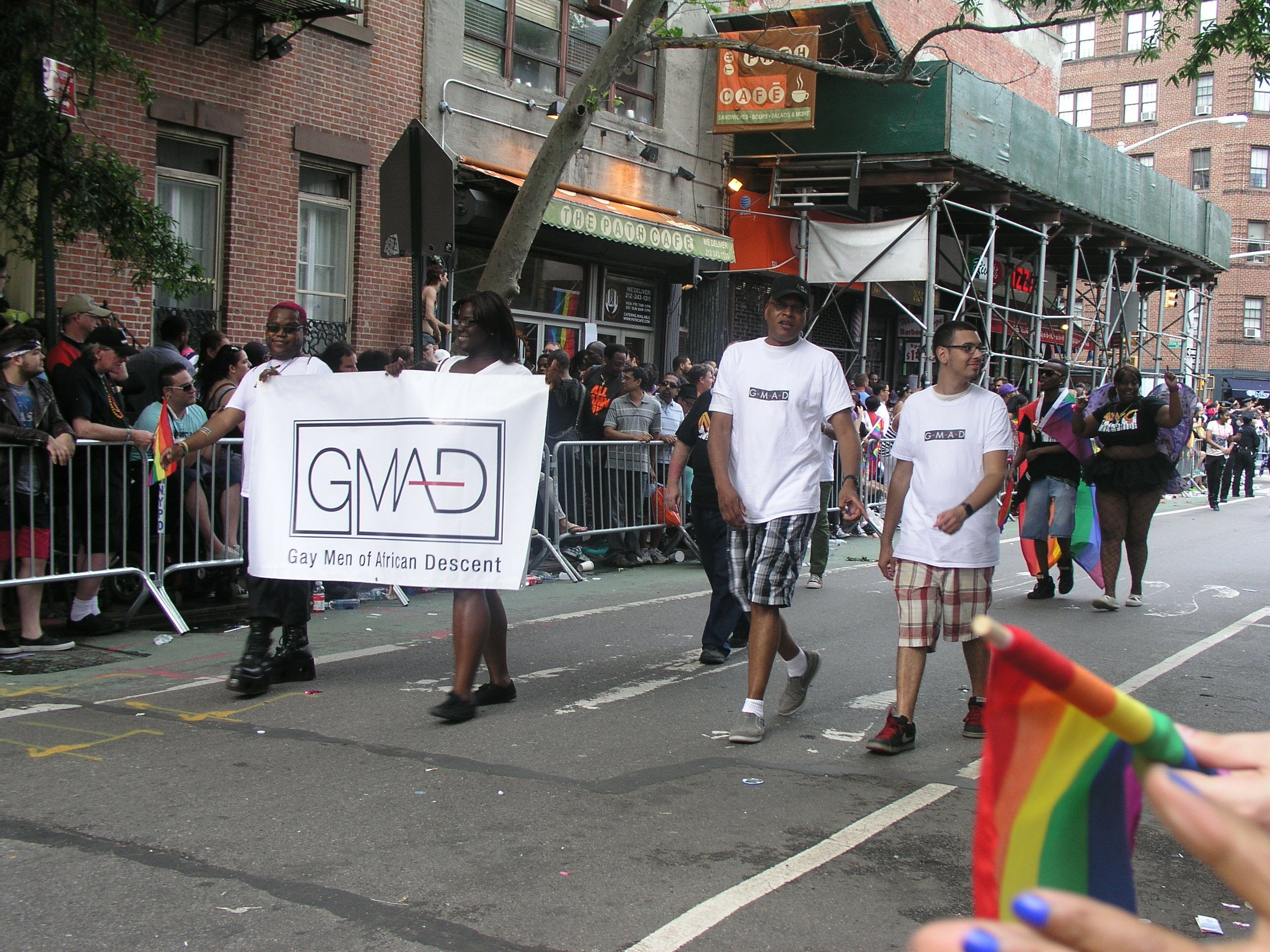
Gay Men of African Descent in New York Pride Parade 2015

== History ==
As a social service organization, GMAD was created to provide community. Since the mid 1980s to present, an ongoing event includes their weekly "Friday Night Forums." This event provides opportunity for community members to dialogue about a number of topics from relationships, aging, sex, HIV/AIDS, parenting, homophobia, and more. Early services also included providing primary prevention services through outreach to the Black gay community. Today the organization continues to provide outreach education, along with HIV testing, syphilis screening, and therapy. In 2011, the Schomburg Center for Research in Black Culture held an event to mark the twenty-fifth anniversary of GMAD. As of 2012, GMAD's Mission Statement "to empower gay men of African-Descent through education, advocacy, health and wellness promotion, and social support."

== See also ==
- African-American culture and sexual orientation
