= Kelly Sinnapah Mary =

- Born: 1981 (age 44–45); Guadeloupe
- Education: Toulouse University System
- Occupations: Visual artist, painter, sculptor, installation artist

Kelly Sinnapah Mary (born 1981) is a french artist from Guadaloupe mostly known for her paintings about creole culture. Her artworks are inspired by decolonization and feminism.

== Life ==
Kelly Sinnapah Mary was born in 1981 in Saint-François, Guadeloupe, to a tamil family. She grew up amongst hindu and catholic indo-caribbeans.

She holds a degree in fine arts from Toulouse University.

Her first exhibition happened in Guadeloupe in 2012.

== Art ==
=== Career ===
Kelly Sinnapah Mary's artwork has been exhibited in the Museum of Contemporary African Diasporan Arts, the Pérez Art Museum Miami, the IDB Gallery in Washington, D.C., the Open Source Geospatial Foundation, the New York Pool Art Fair, the James Cohan Gallery and at the 34th São Paulo Art Biennial.

In 2025, she was awarded the "Étant donnés" prize by the Villa Albertine residency program for the painting "The Book of Violette : Marie-Anne".

=== Themes ===
Kelly Sinnapah Mary works with a variety of mediums : painting, sculpture, sewing, photography, videography, performance, braiding and collage. However, she is best known for her "narrative paintings". She uses dream-like imagery, mythology and surnatural elements to bring attention to contemporary and political subjects. She is inspired by Wangechi Mutu, Suzanne Césaire, Maryse Condé, Édouard Glissant, Aimé Césaire and Khal Torabully.

She is interested in indo-caribbean identities in the french West Indies, which she talks about in postcolonial terms. She is herself of indian descent, and expresses the experience of being both Black and Indian through her art. Indian indenture and its ramifications in collective memory is at the heart of her practice. She often represents Guadeloupe's luscious wilderness in an attempt to link Caribbean people's relationship to nature with contemporary ecological threats.

Womanhood and gender issues have been present in Kelly Sinnapah Mary's artwork since her 2013 installation entitled "Vagina". She uses autofiction to paint her younger self under the guise of an avatar called Sanbras. Sanbras has been appearing in her paintings since 2020. Her name comes from the title character in The Story of Little Black Sambo. In 2025, she made the series of paintings "The Book of Violette" that deals with female puberty, femininity and matriarchy.

Kelly Sinnapah Mary isn't trying to have a feminist point of view, but is using art to explore her own identity. However, she often represents women's experiences and bodies in a sexist, racist and imperialist context. Overall, she is interested in social power dynamics.

=== Artworks ===
- 2013 : "Vagina" (installation)
- 2018- : "Notebook of no return" (series of paintings)
- 2022 : "A Natural Turn", in collaboration with Joiri Minaya, María Berrío and Rosana Paulino at DePaul Art Museum
- 2024 : "The Fables of Sanbras" (series of paintings)
- 2025 : "The Book of Violette" (series of paintings)

== See also ==
- Claire Tancons
- Patricia Mohammed
