= Natalie Wood (curator) =

Canadian multimedia artist, curator, arts educator

- Born: Trinidad
- Education: York University
- Occupations: Artist, curator, professor
- Employer: George Brown College
- Website: https://iamnataliewood.blogspot.com/

Natalie Wood is a Trinidadian-Canadian multidisciplinary artist, curator, and professor. Her work focuses on popular culture, education, and historical research through visual arts and other media. The mediums of her art practice include painting, drawing, printmaking, photography, video, and performance. Through her politically-engaged and identity-based art she engages with issues of representation and challenges to hegemonic systems, and explores Black feminist, queer, and diasporic identity in historical narratives. She is also a community-based queer activist.

== Early life and education ==
Wood was born and raised in Trinidad, relocating in 1984 to Toronto, Ontario to pursue a specialist degree in psychology, sociology, and women's studies from the University of Toronto. She later took studio courses and obtained a degree in studio art from the Ontario College of Art and an Master of Arts in art education from the Ontario Institute for Studies in Education.

She is a Ph.D. candidate at the Faculty of Environmental Studies at York University. Wood's studies focus on Black futurity, the design and performance of change, the healing role of artists in the Afro-Caribbean diaspora, and imagining and sustaining models of liberation in the face of anti-Black racism.

Wood is a professor in the Social Service Worker Program at George Brown College.

== Artistic and curatorial work ==
=== Visual works ===
- Pillow Play (2018), with Nila Gupta (as a group called Plan B) - participatory sculpture piece.
- Kiss & Tell (2014) - mural on Church Street consisting of digital prints of 5 couples in silhouette, inspired by the "Kissing Doesn't Kill" poster by Gran Fury.

=== Videography ===
- Busshead Hardhead - 02:55 minutes (2024)
- Blue - 06:00 minutes (2018)
- Time Will Come - 06:00 minutes (2018)
- Hangman - 08:00 minutes (2016)
- Touched by a Soucouyant - 05:00 minutes (2015)
- Bananagrams - 27:05 minutes (2013)
- Will - 03:00 minutes (2012)
- The Bond Girl - 04:45 minutes (2008)
- Daisy Redux: Daisy Gets a Divorce - 06:00 minutes (2008)
- Homesick - 03:14 minutes (2007)
- Packing Unpacking - 04:20 minutes (2007)
- The Line is Drawn - 00:32 minutes (2007)
- Call Me Daisy - 03:00 minutes (2006)
- Dash Domi - 01:29 minutes (2005)
- The Locks Narrative - 10:00 minutes (2005)
- Medusa's Hats - 03:00 minutes (2005)
- The Dozens - 07:00 minutes (2004)
- Enter, Hailey - 08:00 minutes (2002)

=== Performance art ===
- Blue Devil performance at Blockorama Pride (2017)
- Blue Devil performance at Caribana (2015)
- Blue Devil Caribana performance at the Harbourfront Centre (2011)
- Blue Devil live theatre performance at Buddies in Bad Times Theatre (2006)
- Blue Devil live dance performance at Toronto Pride (2006)

=== Curatorial work ===
- Lifelines - Wildseed Centre for Art & Activism, co-curated with Rochelle Ellar (2024).
- Shadow on the Prairie - Images Festival & WARC Gallery, media show by Deanna Bowen (March 2009).
- I Represent - A Space Gallery (2006).
- The Hero Project - WARC Gallery (2006).
- Iconography of Divination, and Sign of Spirit - A Space Gallery, by Winsom Winsom (2003).
- Starting Fires - A Space Gallery, Lesbian Artists Group Show (2002).

=== Collections ===
- Royal Bank of Canada
- The Wedge Collection

== Academic career ==
Wood is a social work professor in the School of Social and Community Services at George Brown College, incorporating art into her research. She serves as the Black Futures Coordinator at George Brown.

Wood co-founded the Social Innovation Hub (SIH) with Zuby Saloojee in 2014 at George Brown College.

== Awards and grants ==
- Explore and Create Program, Canada Council (2020).
- Black Arts Fellowship, Wildseed Centre for Art & Activism (2019–2022).
- Access and Career Development Grant, Ontario Arts Council ( 2019).
- Black Leadership Award, Black Student Success Network at George Brown College (2017).
- Exhibition Assistance, Ontario Arts Council (2012).
- Access Grant, Ontario Arts Council (2011).
- Established Media Artist Grant, Toronto Arts Council (2007).
- New Pioneers Award for Contribution to Arts and Culture (2006).
- K.M. Hunter Nomination for Interdisciplinary Arts (2006).
- Mid Career Media Arts Award, Ontario Arts Council (2006).
- Audience Choice Award, Mpenzi Toronto Film and Video Festival (2006).
- Trinidad Artist Residency, Canada Council for the Arts (2005).
- Emerging Artist for Visual Arts, Ontario Arts Council (2004).
- Emerging Artist for Visual Arts, Canada Council for the Arts ( 2003).
- Emerging Artist for Visual Arts, Toronto Arts Council (2003).
- M. NourbeSe Philip Award for d02 (2003).
- Civic Recognition Award for Work within the Arts, City of York (1997).
