= New Orleans Airlift =

New Orleans Airlift is an artist-driven arts nonprofit, located in New Orleans, Louisiana. New Orleans Airlift is dedicated to producing innovative projects for New Orleans–based artists to collaborate and engage with diverse communities locally and internationally. Airlift projects are identified by collaboration, experimentation and a belief in the artist’s role in creating a just, equitable and joyous future.

Airlift's programming highlights New Orleans’ underground art and experimental artists. Through networks, friendships, and close connections to New Orleans' street life, Airlift is able to cultivate and foster long-standing relationships with artists locally and globally. The organization understands how important a dynamic street culture, living culture and a thriving contemporary arts scene are to the neighborhoods within New Orleans. By transporting that which is unique to New Orleans to workshops, festivals, performances, and collaborative projects, Airlift is able to bring recognition to New Orleans as well as provide inspiration and creative collaboration around the globe.

== History ==
Airlift was founded in 2008 by Delaney Martin and Jay Pennington. Pennington and Martin began to collaborate just after Hurricane Katrina. As they witnessed the particular devastation of the Storm on the New Orleans artistic community, Pennington and Martin saw collaborative creativity as a way of coming together and mending their community.

Together they organized an event called The New Orleans Airlift, which brought New Orleans artists to Berlin, Germany in 2009. Jay and Delaney named this project, thought to be a one-time-event, after the Berlin Airlift of WWII. Soon after returning from Berlin, though, Jay and Delaney decided to continue the cultivation of unique artistic collaborations, and kept the organization under the name New Orleans Airlift.

== Projects ==
Airlift projects are hallmarked by creative collaboration, and artistic experimentation. One of the most successful projects to date has been The Music Box, a multi-disciplinary project dedicated to the exploration and performance of musical architecture. This project was inspired by the twin pillars of New Orleans culture, music and architecture.

From 2011 through 2012 the first ever installation of The Music Box, called "A Shantytown Sound Laboratory," presented groundbreaking musical performances and hosted free public hours in its inaugural location, the historic Bywater neighborhood. Constructed from the remains of a blighted house, invented instruments were embedded into the walls, ceilings and floors of structures created by 25 collaborating artists. The Music Box captured the hearts of New Orleans community and the attention of international press, including NPR who said: “High concept and nontraditional as it may be, The Music Box has found a place in the long history of New Orleans music."

New Orleans Airlift continues to pair New Orleans artists with influential institutions, individuals and community members to collaborate and create artistic productions that are participatory, multifaceted and high quality. In the spring of 2015, New Orleans Airlift completed their installment of the Roving Village Residencies, an ambitious project where the musical houses travel to different neighborhoods around New Orleans. The first residency took place in City Park. Over the course of six weeks (April to May 2015) over 10,000 audience members explored the installation through night time orchestral concerts, free public hours on weekends, educational workshops and artist talks. Over 700 children participated in the Music Box Roving Village: City Park through school field trips and after school partnerships. The Village also hosted musicians from all musical backgrounds and locations such as Bruce “Sunpie” Barnes, Solange Knowles, Wilco, influential Jazz musicians William Parker and Cooper Moore, Lost Bayou Ramblers, and Preservation Hall Jazz Band, to name a few.

Having proved to be a great success, a permanent Music Box Village and headquarters for New Orleans Airlift has been erected in the Bywater, neighborhood of New Orleans.
