= Zachari Logan =

Canadian visual artist

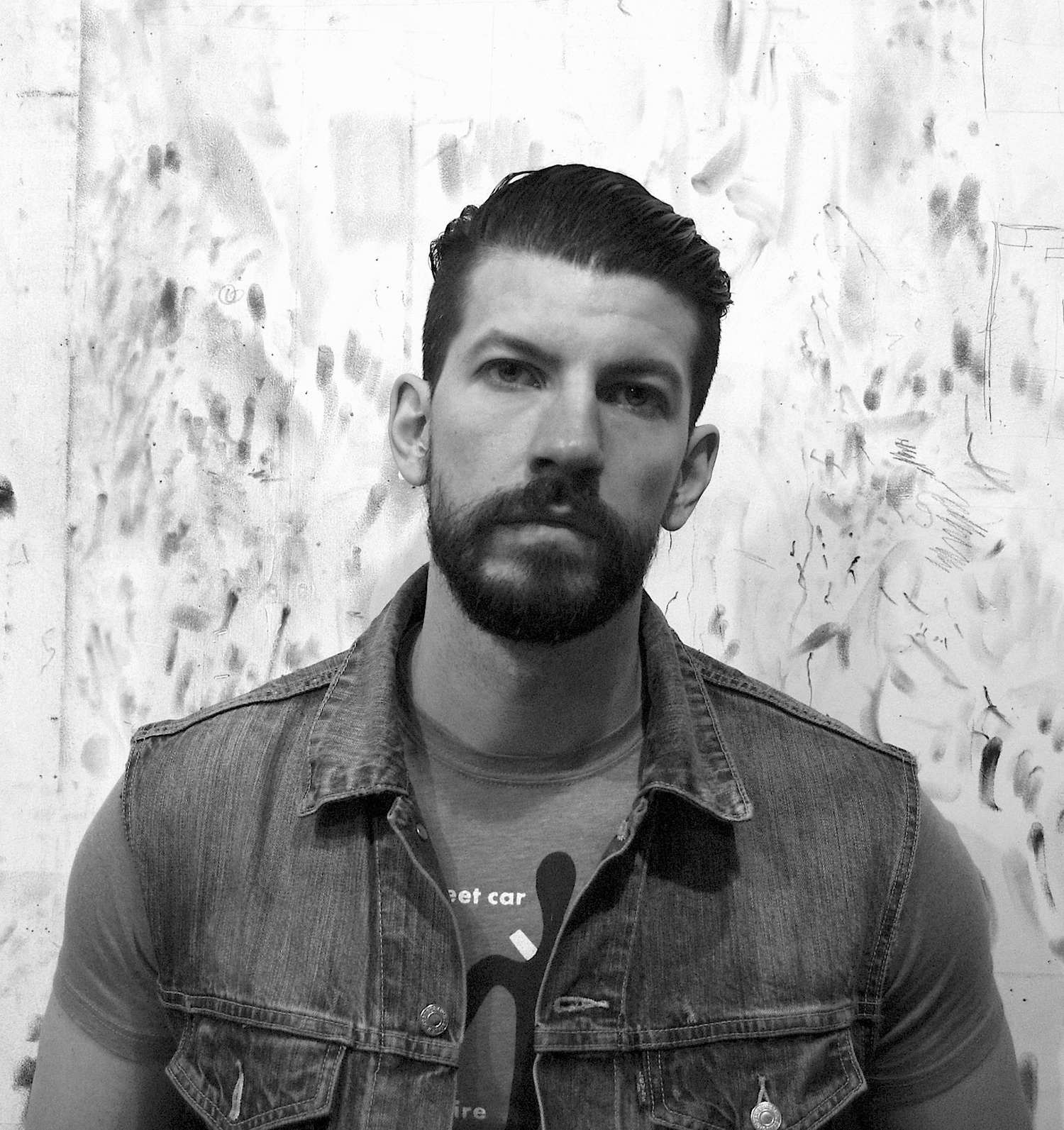
- Born: 1980; Saskatoon, Saskatchewan, Canada
- Education: Master of Fine Arts
- Alma mater: University of Saskatchewan
- Known for: Graphic artist and ceramicist
- Notable work: Eunuch Tapestry 5, Emperor's New Clothes, Fuel Pump
- Style: Photorealism
- Awards: Lieutenant Governor's Art Award, Saskatchewan
- Website: zachariloganart.com

Zachari Logan (born 1980 Saskatoon) is a Canadian visual artist working in drawing, ceramics and related installation practices. Logan is known for his monumentally-scaled pastel drawings and intimate blue and red pencil drawings on Mylar depicting flora, wildlife and figures. His work intersects themes of selfhood, sexuality, queerness and memory with a focus on human relationships with the natural world. He often makes historical art references to artists and particular works of art, most notably the 18th century artist Mary Delany, 16th century Italian painter Giuseppe Arcimboldo, and 15th century Unicorn Tapestries. Logan attended the University of Saskatchewan. In 2014 Logan received the Lieutenant Governor's Arts Award for "emerging artist". In 2021 his artist's book, A Natural History of Unnatural Things, was published by the Radiant Press.

== Artist in residence ==
Logan was an artist in Residence at the Tom Thomson Shack on commission by the McMichael Canadian Art Collection. From June 26 to July 8, 2017, Logan worked on-site to create a site-specific installation for permanent display. In addition, he was also commissioned to create a drawing inspired by Thomson that would remain in McMichael's permanent collection. The result, titled, Witness, the Near Shore from Eunuch Tapestries (for Tom), was included in a subsequent exhibition at MCAC titled, Passion Over Reason: Tom Thomson and Joyce Weiland.

== Public collections ==
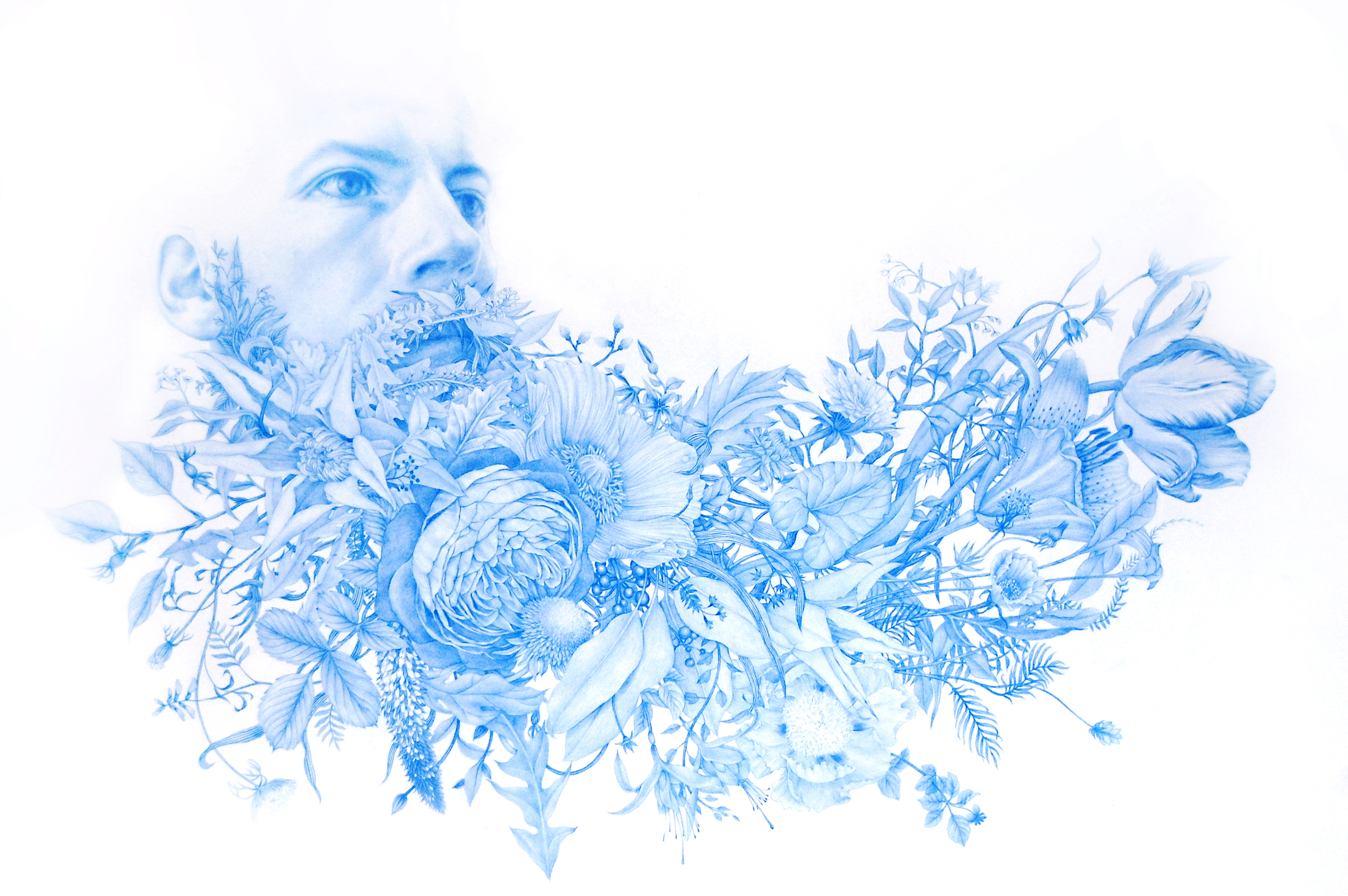
Zachari Logan Wildman No. 13, Flora, 2016 Blue pencil on Mylar Collection of the Art Gallery of Ontario

Logan's work is included in the collections of the Art Gallery of Ontario, the Leslie-Lohman Museum, the National Gallery of Canada and the McMichael Canadian Art Collection.

== Personal ==
Logan lives with his husband in Regina, Saskatchewan.
