= Wendy Nanan =

Trinidadian artist (born 1955)

- Born: 1955 (age 69–70); Port of Spain, Trinidad
- Education: Wolverhampton Polytechnic
- Known for: Sculpture, painting

Wendy Nanan (born 1955) is an artist from Trinidad and Tobago. Much of her work focuses on the multi-racial aspects of Trinidadian society, often featuring images of religious figures and post-colonial symbolism. Nanan has exhibited in Paris, London, Washington DC, Kentucky, Prince Edward Island, British Columbia, Johannesburg and the Dominican Republic.

== Biography ==
Born in Port of Spain, Trinidad, she took classes at Manchester Polytechnic, before obtaining her BFA in Painting from Wolverhampton Polytechnic in 1979. She has been exhibiting regularly worldwide since 1985, and is currently based in the town of her birth. She attended cricket matches with her parents in childhood, an experience reflected in some of her work. She works in various media, including painting, printmaking, and sculpture.

Nanan's work is included in the National Museum and Art Gallery collection in Port of Spain. Her images are featured in a limited edition first-day cover for Royal Mail's "World of Invention" stamp issue, celebrating the London Cricket Conference 1–3 March 2007, first international workshop of its kind, hosted by the Institute of Commonwealth Studies, University of London. In a 2012 exhibition entitled Independence, at Medulla Art Gallery, Port of Spain, she applied her art to interrogate Trinidad and Tobago's 50th anniversary of independence from Great Britain: several life-sized multi-ethnic queenly heads layered with postage stamps from former British colonies now forming the Commonwealth of Nations, revealed how the image of England’s queen was projected into all corners of the world, reflected today in lingering colonial mentalities.

Wendy Nanan is represented in two art history publications: Caribbean Art by Veerle Poupeye, and Art in the Caribbean by Anne Walmsley and Stanley Greaves.
