= Kate Fowle =

English art curator (born 1971)

- Born: 26 June 1971 (age 55); Kent, England
- Occupations: Art curator and manager
- Known for: Director of MoMA PS1; Chief Curator of Garage Museum of Contemporary Art
- Title: Director of the Arts Program at the Hearthland Foundation

Kate Fowle (born 26 June 1971) is an English curator, author, and arts administrator. She is currently the Director of the Arts Program at the Hearthland Foundation, which she joined in April 2025. Fowle has held several high-profile leadership roles in the international art world, including serving as the director of MoMA PS1 in New York, United States, the chief curator of the Garage Museum of Contemporary Art in Moscow, Russia, and the executive director of Independent Curators International (ICI).

== Early life and education ==
Fowle was born in 1971 and raised in England. She originally trained as an artist, graduating in 1993. Shortly afterwards, she transitioned into curatorial work, beginning her career at the Towner Eastbourne and Museum, formerly Towner Art Gallery, in Eastbourne, East Sussex, where she served as a curator from 1994 to 1996.

== Career ==
=== Early career and Smith + Fowle (1996–2002) ===
In 1996, Fowle co-founded Smith + Fowle in London an independent curatorial partnership that developed commission-based programming across the United Kingdom.

=== California College of the Arts and UCCA (2002–2008) ===
Fowle moved to the United States of America in 2001. In 2002, she co-founded the Master's Program in Curatorial Practice at the California College of the Arts (CCA) in San Francisco, the first program of its kind on the West Coast. She served as the program's chair until 2007. Following her tenure at CCA, she moved to Beijing, China, to become the first international curator at the Ullens Center for Contemporary Art (UCCA) from 2007 to 2008.

=== Independent Curators International (2009–2013) ===
From 2009 to 2013, Fowle served as the executive director of Independent Curators International (ICI) in New York. During her time there, she significantly expanded the organization's international reach and founded the Curatorial Intensive, the first short-term professional training program for curators.

=== Garage Museum of Contemporary Art (2013–2019) ===
In 2013, Fowle was appointed the inaugural chief curator (and later artistic director) of the Garage Museum of Contemporary Art in Moscow. She oversaw the development of its research, archive, and publishing departments and curated major exhibitions for artists such as Louise Bourgeois, John Baldessari, and Robert Longo.

=== MoMA PS1 and Hearthland Foundation (2019–present) ===
In 2019, Fowle succeeded Klaus Biesenbach as the director of MoMA PS1 in Queens, New York. During her tenure, she navigated the museum through the COVID-19 pandemic and curated the landmark exhibition Greater New York 2021. She stepped down from the role in July 2022.

In April 2023, Fowle was appointed the Director of the Arts Program at the Hearthland Foundation, a philanthropic organization founded by Kate Capshaw and Steven Spielberg.

== Boards and advisory roles ==
Fowle holds several advisory positions, including:

- Board Chair: Center for Art & Advocacy.
- Board Member: Artistic Noise.
- Regional Advisor: Kadist Foundation (Paris/San Francisco).

== Select publications ==
- Exhibit Russia: The New International Decade 1986–1996 (2016)
- Rashid Johnson: Within Our Gates (2016)
- Proof: Francisco Goya, Sergei Eisenstein, Robert Longo (2017)

== See also ==
- Koyo Kouoh
- Tandazani Dlakama
- Cathleen Chaffee
- Carol Yinghua Lu
