= EVA International =

Biannual contemporary art exhibition in Limerick, Ireland

- Genre: Biennial of contemporary art
- Frequency: Biennial, every two years
- Locations: Limerick, Ireland
- Inaugurated: 1977
- Next event: 2020
- Website: www.eva.ie

EVA International (previously known as Limerick Exhibition of Visual Art and e v + a) is a large-scale contemporary art exhibition that takes place every two years in the city of Limerick, Ireland. It is known as Ireland's biennial, and is held in even-numbered years.

== History ==
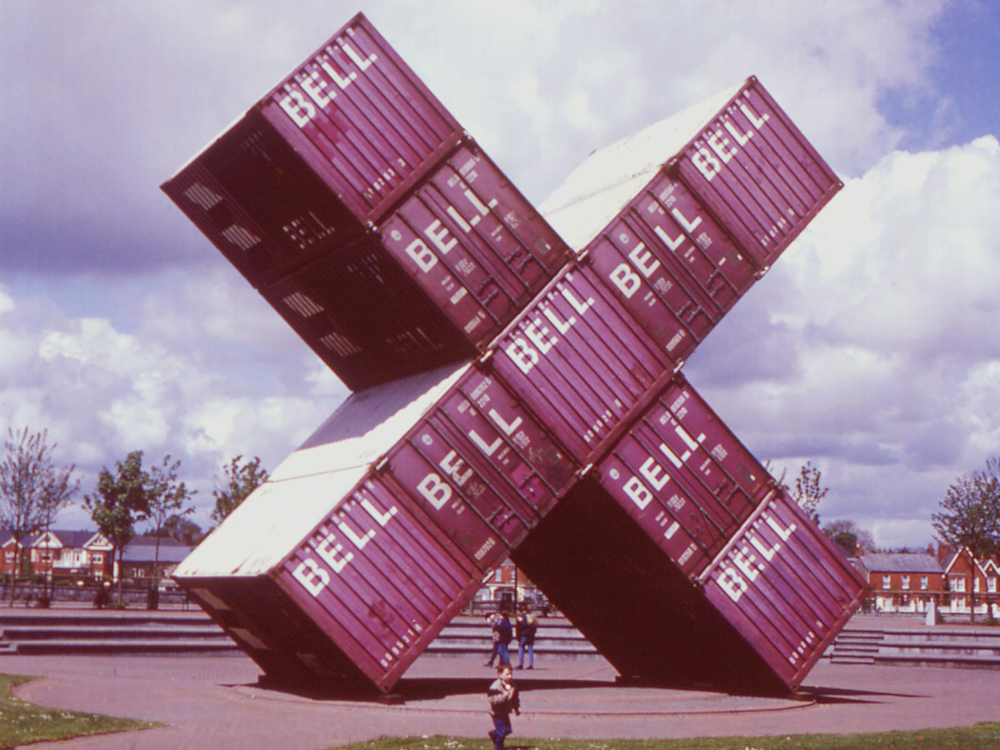
Luc Deleu, 'Construction X' on display in Arthur's Quay Park, Limerick for EV+A 1994. Large-scale outdoor installation made from shipping containers.

The first incarnation of EVA International was The 77 Exhibition of Visual Art, created by the original committee with the mission statement of providing the public ‘with an opportunity to visit and experience an exhibition not normally available in the region and, at the same time, to stimulate an awareness of the visual arts here’. Between then and 2017, there have been 37 editions of the citywide exhibition.

Each edition is now curated by a different international curator of note, a practice that began with Sandy Nairne in 1979, the only exception to the international rule being Paul O’Reilly, Irish curator of the 1998 edition. The exhibit now has an international focus to its programming, aiming to bring international art to Limerick whilst increasing Ireland's standing in the international art world through invited curators. EVA exhibits have taken place in a number of venues across the city, notably at the Limerick City Gallery of Art, The Hunt Museum, and King John's Castle. For each edition, artists are selected through an open call for submissions, beginning with the first exhibition in 1977. Between 1994 and 2010, the exhibit also included an ‘invited’ selection of artists in addition to those who responded to the open call for artists’ proposals.

Curator Matt Packer was named Director of EVA in March 2017. Packer was previously the Director of CCA Centre For Contemporary Art, Derry.

=== Changes in name ===
The name of the Limerick event has gone through several incarnations, with the original edition being known as the ‘77 Exhibition of Visual Art, Limerick’, the exhibit has variously been known as Exhibition of Visual Art, EVA, and e v + a. Following incorporation as a company limited by guarantee in 2012, the organisation has operated under the business name ‘EVA International’.

=== Young EVA ===
Young EVA is the organisation's flagship education programme. Beginning in 1984, this has taken a variety of forms, frequently involving artist-led workshops with school-age groups, often resulting in an exhibition of young participants’ work.

=== Platform Commissions ===
Platform Commissions is a programme initiative started in 2018 by EVA International that focuses on the commission of works and projects by artists based in Ireland.

== Editions ==
year	title	curator(s)	notes
1977	The 77 Exhibition	Brian King, Barrie Cooke, John Kelly	The 1977 Exhibition of Visual Art took place across the Municipal Art Gallery (now the Limerick City Gallery of Art), the Cummins Gallery (no longer in operation), and The National Institute for Higher Education, Castletroy (now University of Limerick).
1978	The 78 Exhibition	Adrian Hall, Charles Harper, Theo McNab, Cóilín Murray	
1979	EVA 79	Sandy Nairne	EVA 79 marked the first time that the exhibit was presided over by an invited international curator and adjudicator. Nairne set no specific theme for the exhibition, and wrote 'I have selected for the exhibition work that I consider to be the highest quality' from amongst 400 submissions.
1980	EVA 80	Brian O’Doherty	
1981	EVA 81	Pierre Rastany	
1982	EVA 82	Liesbeth Brandt Corstius	
1983	New Work of Past Winners		For the 1983 edition of EVA, the committee held a reflective event, inviting the winning artists of the EVA prizes awarded at the five exhibits that had been held to date, to submit new or recent work to comprise the year's exhibition. As such, no curator was appointed. An essay by Aidan Dunne reflecting on the success of EVA from its inception was included in the exhibit's accompanying catalogue.
1984	EVA 84	Peter Fuller	Peter Fuller's curatorship was notable for his exclusion of photography on the grounds that it 'is not art', and his refusal to award the sculpture prize to any of the selected sculptural works. During the 1984 exhibit, there was an incident in which a local resident attempted to deface David Lilburn's self-portrait, entitled Towards from the Forceps to the Chains of Office and winner of that year's graphics prize. Having been warned of the event, a photographer from the Limerick Leader arrived in time to take photographs of the resident smashing the glass on the print and prevent any further damage being done. The event was a subject of controversy, reported nationwide, and the photographs were later hung alongside the print in another exhibition.
1985	EVA 85	Rudi Fuchs	
1986	EVA 86	Nabuo Nakamara	
1987	EVA 87	Ida Panicelli	
1988	Limerick Exhibition of Visual + Art 88	Florent Bex and Alexander Rozhin	
1989	EV+A 89: New Work of Past Winners 1984-1988		
1990	EV+A 90: Climates of Thought	Saskia Bos	
1991	EV+A 91	Germano Curant	
1992	EV+A 92	Lars Nittve	
1993	EV+A 93	Gloria Moure	
1994	EV+A 94	Jan Hoet	
1995	EV+A 95	María de Corral	
1996	EV+A 96	Guy Tortosa	
1997	EV+A 97	Paul M. O'Reilly	
1998	EV+A 98: Circus ZZ	Jeanne Greenberg Rohatyn	
2000	e v + a 2000: friends + neighbours	Rosa Martínez	
2001	e v + a 2001: expanded	Salah M. Hassan	
2002	e v + a 2002: heroes + holies	Apinan Poshyananda	
2003	e v + a 2003: on the border of each other	Virginia Pérez-Ratton	Selecting works from the open submissions, Pérez-Ratton commented on how the theme took shape, “the process implied starting out with no previous structure or thematic axis, but rather allowing it to construct itself on the basis of the works presented. […] My intention in this year’s open ev+a focused on creating significant clusters of meaning – that is, grouping works that would relate to one another, and establishing aesthetic, sensitive or conceptual links between them” [taken from ‘Landing in Limerick’ Pérez-Ratton’s introduction to the 2002 catalogue].
2004	e v + a 2004: imagine limerick	Zdenka Badovinac	
2005	OPEN e v + a 2005	Dan Cameron	
2006	e v + a 2006: give (a)way	Katerina Gregos	
2007	OPEN e v + a 2007: a sense of place	Klaus Ottmann	
2008	e v + a 2008: too early for vacation	Hou Hanru	
2009	e v + a 2009: reading the city	Angelika Nollert and Yilmaz Dziewior	
2010	e v + a 2010: matters	Elizabeth Hatz	
2012	EVA International 2012: After the Future	Annie Fletcher	2012's After the Future was EVA International's first edition as a biennial, and the first show under Woodrow Kernohan as director.
2014	EVA International 2014: Agitationism	Bassam El Baroni	Agitationism was a part of the 2014 Limerick National City of Culture programme.
2016	EVA International 2016: Still (the) Barbarians	Koyo Kouoh	
2018	38th EVA International	Inti Guerrero	2018's 38th EVA International was the first edition under Director Matt Packer.
2020			Scheduled to open on 3 July, it was delayed twice, opening 18 September due to the COVID-19 pandemic.
