= Storm Janse van Rensburg =

South African art curator (1972)

- Born: Storm Janse van Rensburg; 4 August 1972; South Africa
- Occupations: Curator and manager
- Known for: Senior curator of Zeitz MOCAA

Storm Janse van Rensburg (born 4 August 1972) is a South African contemporary art curator and cultural practitioner. He is senior curator and head of curatorial affairs at the Zeitz Museum of Contemporary Art Africa in Cape Town, South Africa. His curatorial work spans institutional exhibitions, research, public programming, and writing on contemporary African and diasporic art.

== Early life and education ==
Storm Janse van Rensburg was born on 4 August 1972 in South Africa and grew up on a farm in KwaZulu-Natal. He studied at the University of South Africa, where he earned a Bachelor of Arts in Fine Arts. His academic training in fine arts and visual culture laid the foundation for a curatorial career focused on contemporary African art, institutional transformation, and museum practice.

== Career ==
Janse van Rensburg began his professional career in curatorial positions at the Market Theatre Galleries in Johannesburg between 1995 and 1999 and later at the KwaZulu Natal Society of the Arts in Durban (2000–2006). He was a founding member of the Visual Arts Network of South Africa (VANSA) and served as senior curator at Goodman Gallery Cape Town.

Van Rensburg lived and worked in Berlin, Germany, as an independent curator and researcher from 2012 until 2015, collaborating with institutions including Savvy Contemporary and the Haus der Kulturen der Welt. During this period he was also a fellow of the Academy for Advanced African Studies at the University of Bayreuth, Germany.

From 2015 to 2019, Janse van Rensburg was Head Curator of Exhibitions at the Savannah College of Art and Design Museum of Art in Savannah, United States of America.

=== Zeitz MOCAA ===
On 2 September 2019, he was appointed senior curator and head of curatorial affairs at the Zeitz Museum of Contemporary Art Africa, where he worked with chief curator Koyo Kouh and assistant Tandazani Dlakama. Besides curating major exhibitions at Zeitz MOCAA, Storm is also involved in the University of Cape Town Museum Fellows, a year-long Museum Fellowship Programme facilitated by the University of Western Cape’s faculty and courses conducted within the university's History Department and the Centre of Humanities Research. Janse van Rensburg has also participated in public programming and dialogues, such as moderated conversations with artists at Zeitz MOCAA.

== Curatorial approach ==
Janse van Rensburg's curatorial practice is research-driven, emphasizing contextual interpretation of artistic practices, institutional frameworks, and collaborative public engagement. His work contributes to expanding understanding of contemporary African art within museum settings.

=== Selected curatorial projects ===
- GhostBusters II {Haunted by Heroes}, two-person exhibition with Délio Jasse (Angola / Portugal) & Kara Lynch (USA), co-curated with Nadine Siegert at SAVVY Contemporary, Berlin, Germany .
- The Beautyful Ones, a group exhibition with Dineo Seshee Bopape, Kudzanai Chiurai, Georgina Gratrix, Andrew Gilbert, Kiluanji Kia Henda, Gerald Machona, Gerhard Marx, Meleko Mokgosi, and AthiPatra Ruga at Nolan Judin, Berlin, Germany.
- EAT ME! with Ghada Amer, Joel Andrianomearisoa, Reza Aramesh, Adam Broomberg & Oliver Chanarin, Reza Farkondeh, Kendell Geers, Frances Goodman, Sigalit Landau, Gavin Turk, Hank Willis Thomas, Mickalene Thomas, Goodman Gallery, Cape Town. 2011
- Sala (2023–2026)—Permanent collection exhibition co-curated with museum fellows.
- Indigo Waves & Other Stories: Re-Navigating the Afrasian Sea and Notions of Diaspora (2022–2023)—Exhibition project.

=== Group Exhibitions ===
- The Marks We Make, with Ryan Arenson, Walter Batiss, Deborah Bell, Justin Brett, Lisa Brice, Adam Broomberg & Oliver Chanarin, Kudzanai Chiurai, Marlene Dumas, Claire Gavronsky, Robert Hodgins, William Kentridge, David Koloane, Moshekwa Langa, Brett Murray, Sam Nhlengethwa, Walter Oltmann, Kathryn Smith, Clive van den Berg, Diane Victor, Jeremy Wafer, Sue Williamson, Goodman Gallery,Cape Town. 2010.

=== Solo exhibitions ===
- Records, Siemon Allen, Goodman Gallery, Cape Town, 2011.
- Portraits, David Goldblatt, Goodman Gallery, Cape Town, 2011.
- All Things Being Equal, by Hank Willis Thomas, Goodman Gallery Cape Town.
- History, Labor, Life: The Prints of Jacob Lawrence.
- Labor 11, OBLIQUE—Abrie Fourie, Haus der Kulturen der Welt, Berlin, Germany (catalogue).
- One and the Many. 2025
- Stockholm Cosmologies. 2025

== Other roles ==
In 2025, Janse van Rensburg was appointed Interim Curatorial Director at the Javett Art Centre at the University of Pretoria (Javett-UP). He was also the collaborator and facilitator for the Independent Curators International—Curatorial Intensive held in Cape Town in 2019. Van Rensburg is a co-director of Modern Art Projects South Africa (MAPSA) and a board member at the Banana Club Advisory, whose advisory focus is institutional strategy & international cultural positioning.

== Publications and writing ==
- Dikung, B. ‘To Be Wildly Experimental and See Failure As Part of a Process’, SAVVY Journal, Edition 4, November 2012,
- Kotretsos, G. ‘Storm Janse van Rensburg
- Inside the Artists’ Studio, Art:21 Blog, December 2, 2011.
- Sulcas, R. ‘In Cape Town, Art and Artisans Flourish after Apartheid. 'The New York Times, February 4, 2011.
- Lambrecht, B. “SA kunsfotograwe gesog," Die Burger, July 27, 2010
- MaltzLeca, L. "Critics' Pick: The Marks We Make," artforum.com, January 2010. [15]
- Corrigall, M. "Nation State at the Goodman Gallery Joburg," July 2009, [16].
- Saptouw, F. "Nation State at Goodman Gallery Cape," ArtThrob.
- Stupart, L. "Review: Monomania," Art South Africa, Vol. 7, Issue 02, Summer 2008, p. 93. Brain, N. "Monomania at Goodman Gallery Cape," ArtThrob.
- Johannes Phokela (Zeitz MOCAA).
- Hernan Bas: ‘Bloomsbury Revisited.'
- Radical Solidarity (Zeitz MOCAA).

== See also ==
- Koyo Kouh
- Tandazani Dlakama
- Zeitz Museum of Contemporary Art Africa
