= Apinan =

Apinan may refer to:

- Jeckster Apinan (born 1987), Filipino basketball player
- Apinan Kaewpila (born 1985), Thai footballer
- Apinan Poshyananda (born 1956), Thai curator and art writer
- Apinan Sukaphai (born 1983), Thai sprinter
