= Mark Coetzee =

Mark Coetzee (1964 – 2022) was a South African artist, curator, writer and historian. In 2013, Coetzee helped with the founding of the €35-million private contemporary art museum, colloquially known as the MOCAA with Jochen Zeitz.

In the 1980s, Coetzee studied at Stellenbosch University, the University of Cape Town, and the University of Paris-Sorbonne. In the 1990s he founded the Mark Coetzee Fine Art Cabinet at 120 Bree Street, Cape Town. The space was run as a kind of non-profit venture, subsidized by Coetzee to allow installation-based works, younger artists, and provocative subject matter which was near-impossible to show in commercial spaces at the time. Artists included:

- Jo O'Connor
  - Muscle (2002)
  - Before Swallowing(1998)
- Paul Edmunds
  - Scale (1999)
- Luan Nel
  - Paper 1997

In 2000, Coetzee was funded by the National Arts Council to partake in a residency at the La Cite Internationale des Arts. It was here that he prepared an exhibition entitled "All our sons", held at AVA, 35 Church Street, which explored the pejorative names used to insult gay men. From 2000 to 2009,Coetzee became the director of the Rubell Family Collection He served briefly at the Palm Springs Art museum adjunct curator, but was soon appointed as the Program Director for PUMAVision and Chief Curator of PUMA.Creative.

In 2017, Coetzee spoke at the launch of the MOCAA and served as the first Executive Director and Chief Curator and sat on the board (Ex Officio) of the Zeitz Museum of Contemporary Art Africa in Cape Town. On the 15 May 2018, the museum initiated a suspension from his duties and he tendered his resignation in 2018. Coetzee passed away in July, 2022.
