= Mary Evans (artist) =

English contemporary artist

Mary Evans (born 1963) is a contemporary artist who lives and works in England and utilises in her subject matter both her African heritage and European upbringing.

== Early life and education ==
Evans was born in Lagos, Nigeria in 1963. After a foundation course at St Helens College of Art & Design (1981–82), she studied painting for her B.A. at Gloucestershire College of Arts and Technology (1982–85), and attained her M.A. in Fine Art at Goldsmiths' College (1987–89). She subsequently did a postgraduate residency at the Rijksakademie, Amsterdam (1991–93).

== Career ==
Evans has received a number of significant commissions, awards and residencies, including a Smithsonian Artists Research Fellowship, National Museum of African Art, Washington, DC, in 2010. She typically uses paper as her medium, producing large-scale, site-specific work — sometimes with reference to highly charged subjects, such as lynching in the Deep South. Her work has been exhibited extensively across the UK, as well as internationally — in the United States, the Netherlands, Mexico and China, including Farewell to Post-Colonialism at the 3rd Guangzhou Triennale in 2008, Port City (2007) at the Arnolfini, Bristol, and A Fiction of Authenticity: Contemporary Africa Abroad (2003), Contemporary Art Museum St. Louis.

Reviewing her solo exhibition Cut and Paste (2012, Tiwani Contemporary, London), critic Stephanie Baptist wrote: "Her mixed media artworks reveal not just her story, but African ancestral stories that are not often told. I will liken Evans to a griot. This role is an important one, as she is both historian and storyteller. She carries the collective narratives of the village, the tragic and the triumphant. She who remembers can reinterpret the unwritten histories and share the untold stories of the un-namable that may have otherwise been forgotten."

In 2020 Evans was included in the show Paper Routes: Women to Watch 2020 at the National Museum of Women in the Arts.

Evans is the director of the Slade School of Fine Art at UCL in London

== Selected exhibitions ==
- 1993: Mary Evans - Art & Project, Rotterdam
- 1997: Filter, Leighton House, London
- 2000: Because a Fire Was in my Head, South London Gallery, London
- 2000: Continental Shift, Ludwig Forum fur Internationale Kunst, Aachen, Germany
- 2001: Scope, Café Gallery Projects
- 2003: A Fiction of Authenticity: Contemporary Africa Abroad, Contemporary Art Museum St. Louis
- 2005: 5 Continents and 1 City, Museum of Mexico City, Mexico City, Mexico
- 2007: Freedom & Culture, South Bank Centre, London
- 2007: Port City, Arnolfini, Bristol
- 2008: Meditations, Baltimore Museum of Art, Baltimore
- 2012: Cut and Paste, Tiwani Contemporary, London
- 2016: Thousands Are Sailing, EVA International Biennial
- 2023: GILT, Zeitz MOCAA, Capetown

== Publications ==
- Filter, London: InIVA and the Royal Borough of Kensington and Chelsea, 1997. ISBN 1-899846-14-X
