= Matthew Levatich =

American businessman

- Born: January 7, 1965 (age 61); Ithaca, New York, US
- Education: Ithaca High School
- Alma mater: Rensselaer Polytechnic Institute; Northwestern University
- Occupation: Businessman
- Title: CEO, Harley-Davidson
- Spouse: Brenda Levatich
- Children: 2

Matthew S. Levatich (born January 7, 1965) is an American businessman, and was the president and CEO of Harley-Davidson from May 2015 through February 2020.

== Early life ==
Levatich was born on January 7, 1965, in Tompkins County Hospital, Ithaca, New York. He was educated at Caroline Elementary School, DeWitt Junior High School and Ithaca High School.

Levatich earned a bachelor's degree in mechanical engineering from Rensselaer Polytechnic Institute, a master's degree in engineering management, and an MBA in marketing, finance and organizational behavior from Northwestern University.

== Career ==
Levatich joined Harley-Davidson in 1994 and served as chief operating officer between 2009 and 2015. In May 2015, Levatich became CEO.

In February 2020, Levatich resigned as CEO of Harley-Davidson and vacated his seat on the board of directors. He was succeeded by Jochen Zeitz.

== Personal life ==
He is married to Brenda, they have two sons, live in Mequon, Wisconsin, and celebrated 25 years of marriage in 2015.
