= Bangkok Art Biennale =

Recurring art exhibition held in Bangkok, Thailand

The Bangkok Art Biennale is a biennial contemporary art exhibition held in Bangkok, Thailand, following the biennale format. The event was first held in 2018, and features exhibits by local and international artists spread across multiple venues including temples, shopping malls and public spaces, held over a period of four months. It is directed by Apinan Poshyananda and sponsored mostly by private enterprises.
