= MoMA PS1 =

Museum in Queens, New York

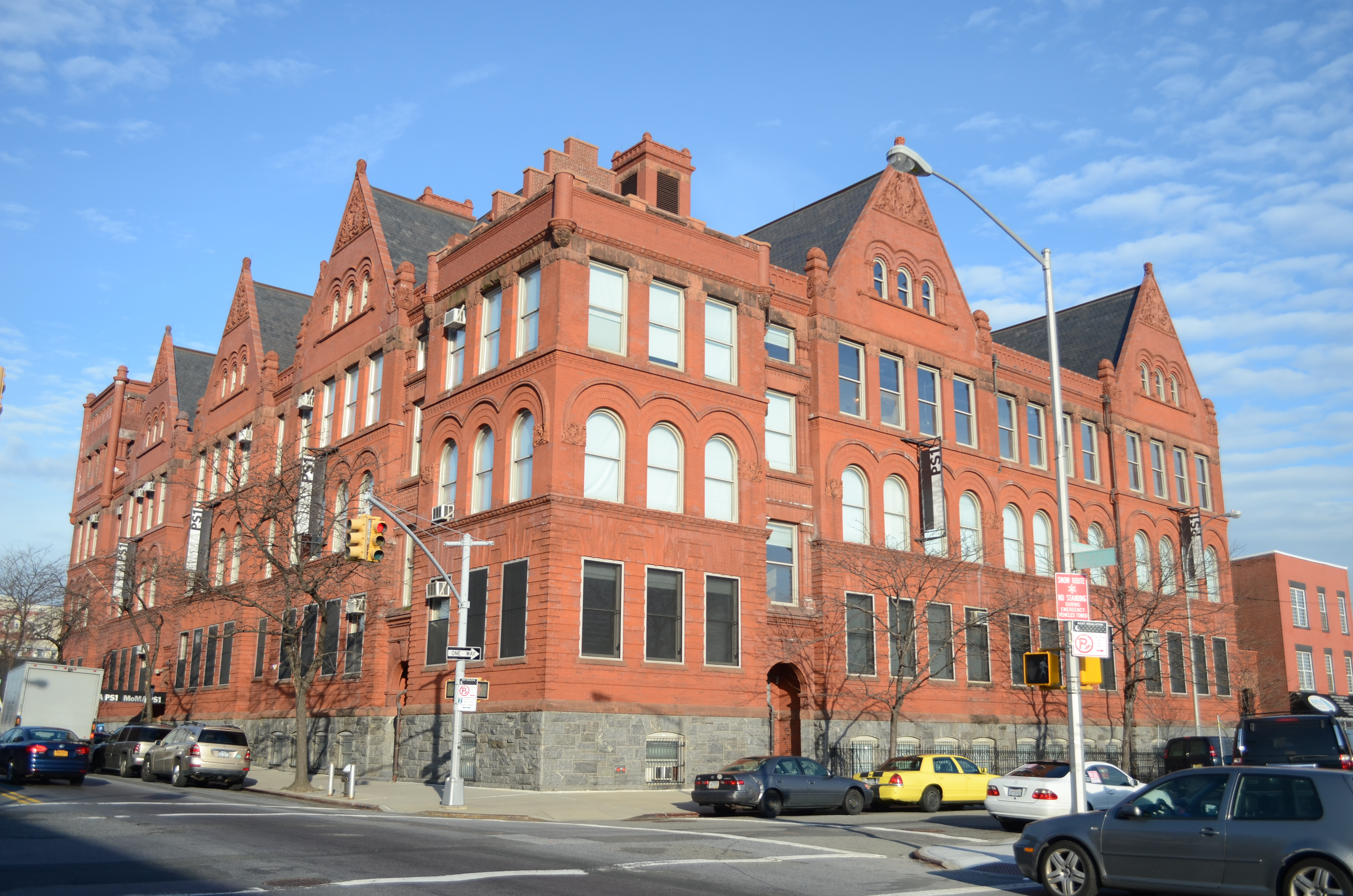
- MoMA PS1 in 2011
- Former names: Institute for Art and Urban Resources Inc. (1971–1988); P.S. 1 Contemporary Art Center (1988–2011)
- Established: 1971
- Location: 22-01 Jackson Avenue, Long Island City, New York 11101; United States
- Coordinates: 40.745367°N 73.947977°W
- Type: Contemporary art
- Visitors: Over 200,000 per year
- Director: Connie Butler
- Website: momaps1.org

MoMA PS1 is a contemporary art museum at 22-01 Jackson Avenue in the Long Island City neighborhood of Queens, in New York City, United States. In addition to its exhibitions, the institution organizes the Sunday Sessions performance series, the Warm Up summer music series, and the Young Architects Program with the Museum of Modern Art. MoMA PS1 has been affiliated with the Museum of Modern Art since January 2000 and, as of 2013, had about 200,000 visitors a year.

== History ==
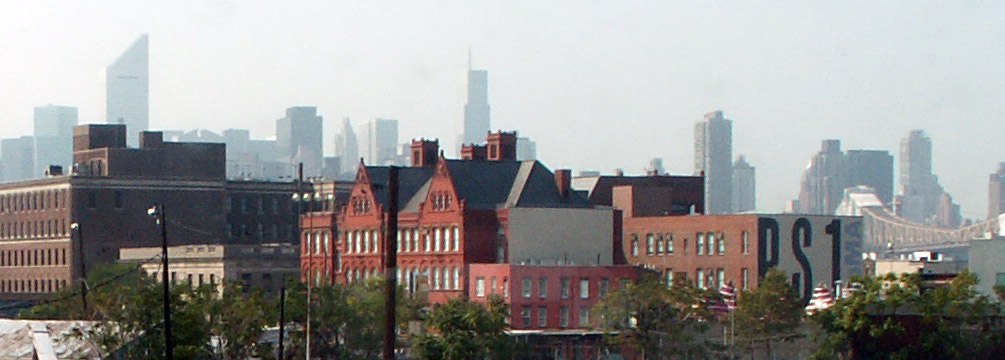
MoMA PS1 with Manhattan skyline in background

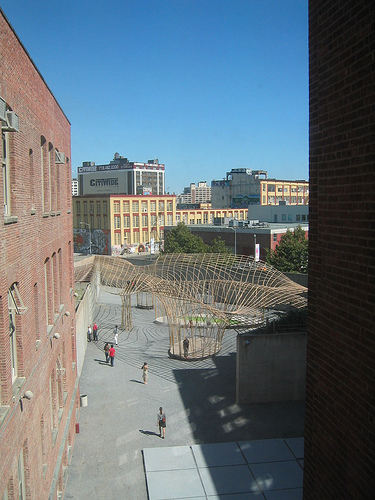
Architectural installation Canopy by nARCHITECTS from summer 2004

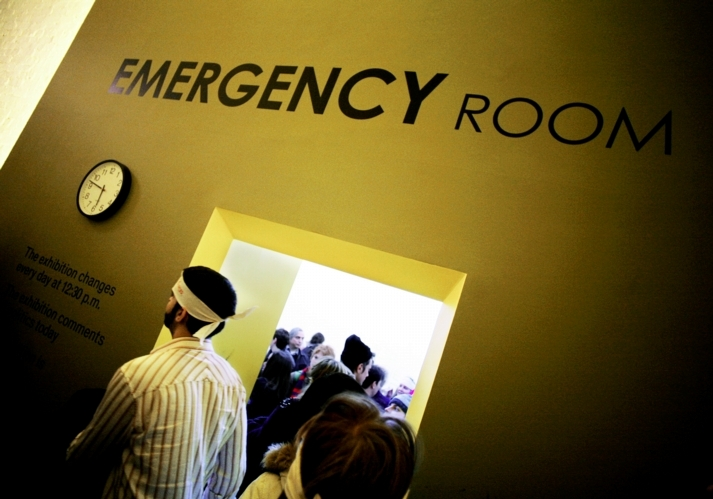
Format Emergency Room by Thierry Geoffroy, February/March 2007

=== Founding ===
What would become MoMA PS1 was founded in 1971 by Alanna Heiss as the Institute for Art and Urban Resources Inc.

In 1976, Heiss opened the P.S. 1 Contemporary Art Center in a deserted Romanesque Revival public school building, significantly increasing the organization's exhibition and studio capacity. This building, dating from 1892, served as the first school in Long Island City until 1963, when the First Ward school it housed was closed due to low attendance and the building was turned into a warehouse.

In October 1997, P.S.1 Contemporary Art Center reopened to the public after a three-year, $8.5 million renovation project designed by Los Angeles-based architecture firm Frederick Fisher & Partners.

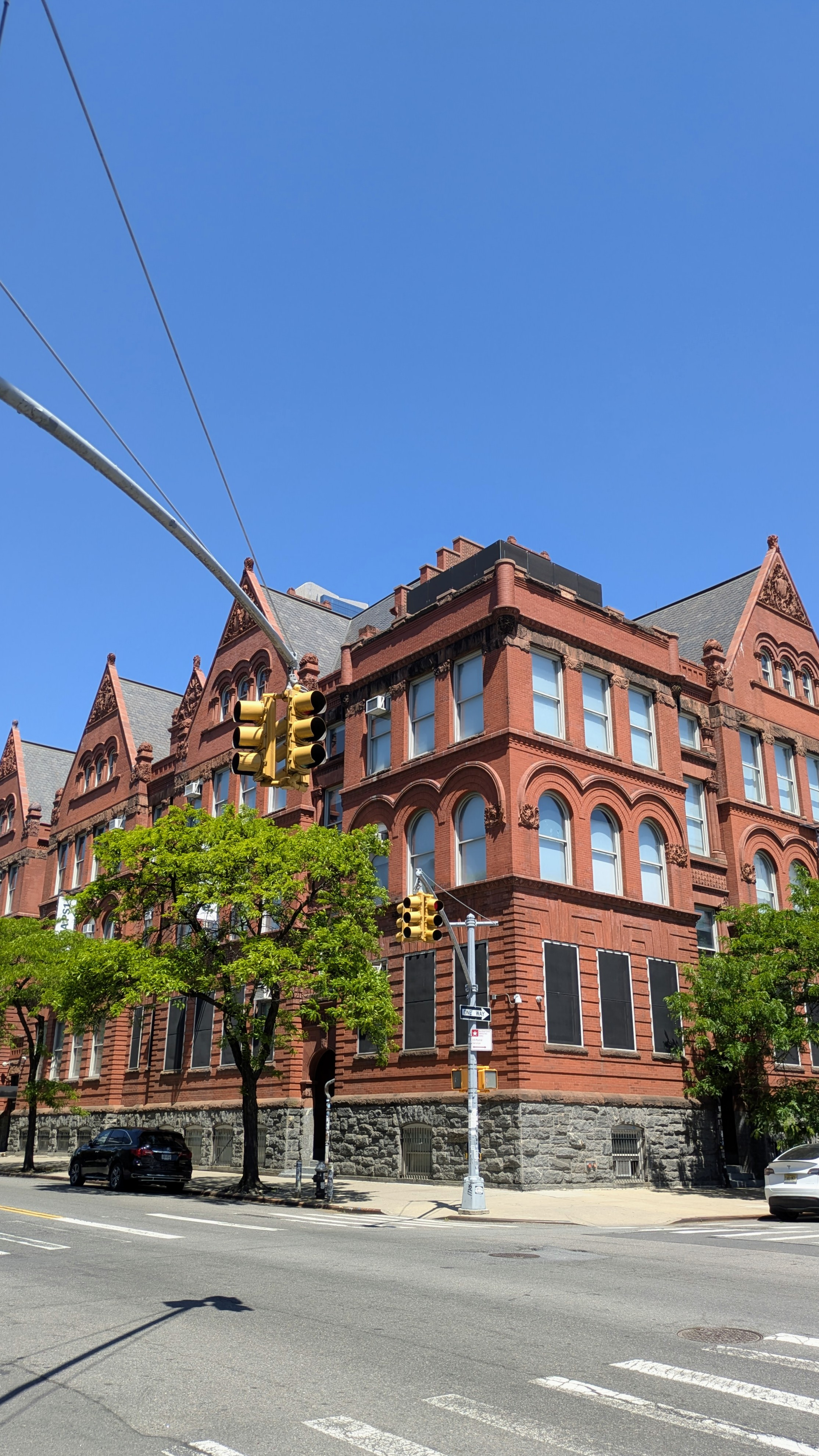
MoMA PS1 as seen from Jackson Avenue

=== Affiliation with the Museum of Modern Art ===
In February 1999, P.S. 1 Contemporary Art Center and the Museum of Modern Art announced their impending institutional merger, which was planned to take 10 years and was designed to preserve P.S. 1 as a center of independent experimentation and exploration. MoMA PS1 and the Museum of Modern Art formalized their affiliation in January 2000. New York City, which owns the MoMA PS1 building, endorsed the merger.

The principal objective of MoMA's partnership with MoMA PS1 is to promote the enjoyment, appreciation, study, and understanding of contemporary art to a wide and growing audience. Collaborative programs of exhibitions, educational activities, and special projects allow both institutions to draw on their respective strengths and resources and to continue shaping a cultural discourse. The two institutions also integrated their development, education, marketing, financial planning and membership departments.

To mark the 10th anniversary of the merger between the former P.S. 1 Contemporary Art Center and MoMA, the museum changed its name to MoMA PS1 in 2010.

=== Later development ===
In 2008, following the completion of a 10-year merger process with MoMA, Alana Heiss retired as director of P.S. 1 Contemporary Art Center after 36 years. In 2009, Klaus Biesenbach was named Director of the renamed MoMA PS1. Biesenbach had first joined at PS1 as a curator in 1997, and subsequently held the positions of Curator in MoMA's Department of Film and Media and Chief Curator of MoMA's Department of Media and Performance Art. Biesenbach left the museum for the Museum of Contemporary Art in Los Angeles in July 2018, leaving the museum temporarily without a director.

In November 2018, MoMA PS1 art handlers demonstrated outside the museum to earn the same pay as similar workers at MoMA in Manhattan, and in March 2019, the museum paid a settlement with a curator who accused the museum of rescinding a job offer due to pregnancy. In June 2019, Kate Fowle was announced as the museum's new director. In November 2019, a new restaurant opened in the museum.

Following a longer than initially expected closure for the coronavirus pandemic, on April 13, 2020, MoMA PS1 told its employees there would be furloughs due to the museum facing its "most serious financial crisis" ever, with impact to be felt "for years to come," according to director Kate Fowle. 70% of the museum's workforce was furloughed, leaving 17 employees working at the museum. During the George Floyd protests in New York City in June 2020, the museum and the Brooklyn Museum were the only two major art institutions to participate in the Open Your Lobby initiative, which asks businesses to provide protestors with shelter or resources. After the entrepreneur Sonya Yu donated $900,000 in late 2025, MoMA PS1 announced that it would offer free admission for three years starting in January 2026.

== Programs, installations, and events ==
=== Artist and exhibition programs ===
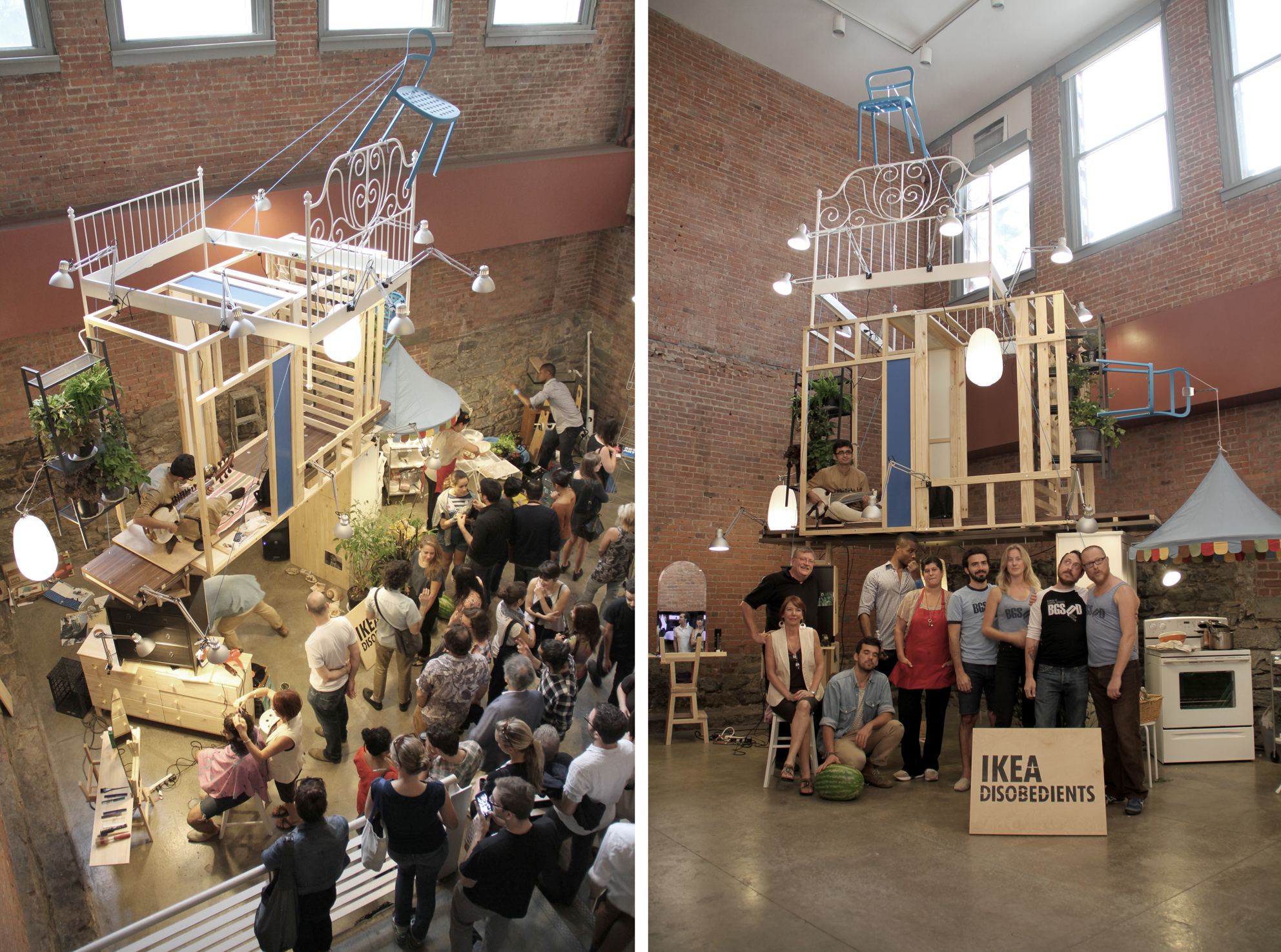
IKEA Disobedients. Architectural archive, installation and performance on non familiar domestic urbanisms. MoMA PS1. MoMA Collection. 2012.

The premiere exhibition, Rooms, held in June 1976, featured the works of 78 artists, many of whom created site-specific installations in the former classrooms. For Rooms, the sculptor Alan Saret cut a tiny hole in one wall, creating an almost heavenly aureole of light at one end of the third-floor hallway. The museum has featured the works of the artists Janet Cardiff, David Hammons, Kimsooja, Hilma af Klint, Donald Lipski, John McCracken, Dennis Oppenheim, Michelangelo Pistoletto, Alan Saret, Katharina Sieverding, Keith Sonnier, Michael Tracy, Franz West, Maria Lassnig, Judy Rifka, and Peter Young. Its landmark survey of Mike Kelley in 2013 was the largest exhibition of the artist's work at the time.

A focus has been on outsider artists such as Henry Darger, who was included in Disasters of War: Francisco de Goya, Henry Darger, Jake and Dinos Chapman (2000). Greater New York, a survey of emerging artists working in New York City, was established in 2000 and is mounted every five years.

In November 2019, the Trump administration travel ban resulted in denied visas to a number of Iraqi artists taking part in MoMA PS1's Theater of Operations: The Gulf Wars 1991–2011 exhibitions, resulting in criticism by activists.

=== Young Architects Program ===
The Young Architects Program (YAP) was an annual competition hosted by MoMA PS1 and The Museum of Modern Art that invited young architects to submit design proposals for MoMA PS1's courtyard. The winning entry was converted from concept to construction and became the architectural setting for MoMA PS1's summer Warm Up music series. The Young Architects program was initially placed on a one-year hiatus in late 2019. Following years of inactivity, MoMA indicated in a larger press release that the program had concluded, and that the program's goals of promoting new ideas in architecture would be subsequently taken on by the Architecture Now exhibition series opening in 2023.

=== Warm Up ===
Warm Up is MoMA PS1's music series summer event.

== Management ==
Under chairwoman Agnes Gund, in 2010 the MoMA PS1's board of directors included the artists Cindy Sherman and Mickalene Thomas, art historian Diana Widmaier-Picasso, and art collectors Adrian Cheng and Peter Norton.

In 2020 an open letter by artists asked the museum to remove Larry Fink and Leon Black from the MoMA PS1 board for their investment history.

The city provided about eight percent of its operating budget in 2019.
