= Zeitz Museum of Contemporary Art Africa =

Art museum, design/textile museum, historic site in Cape Town, South Africa

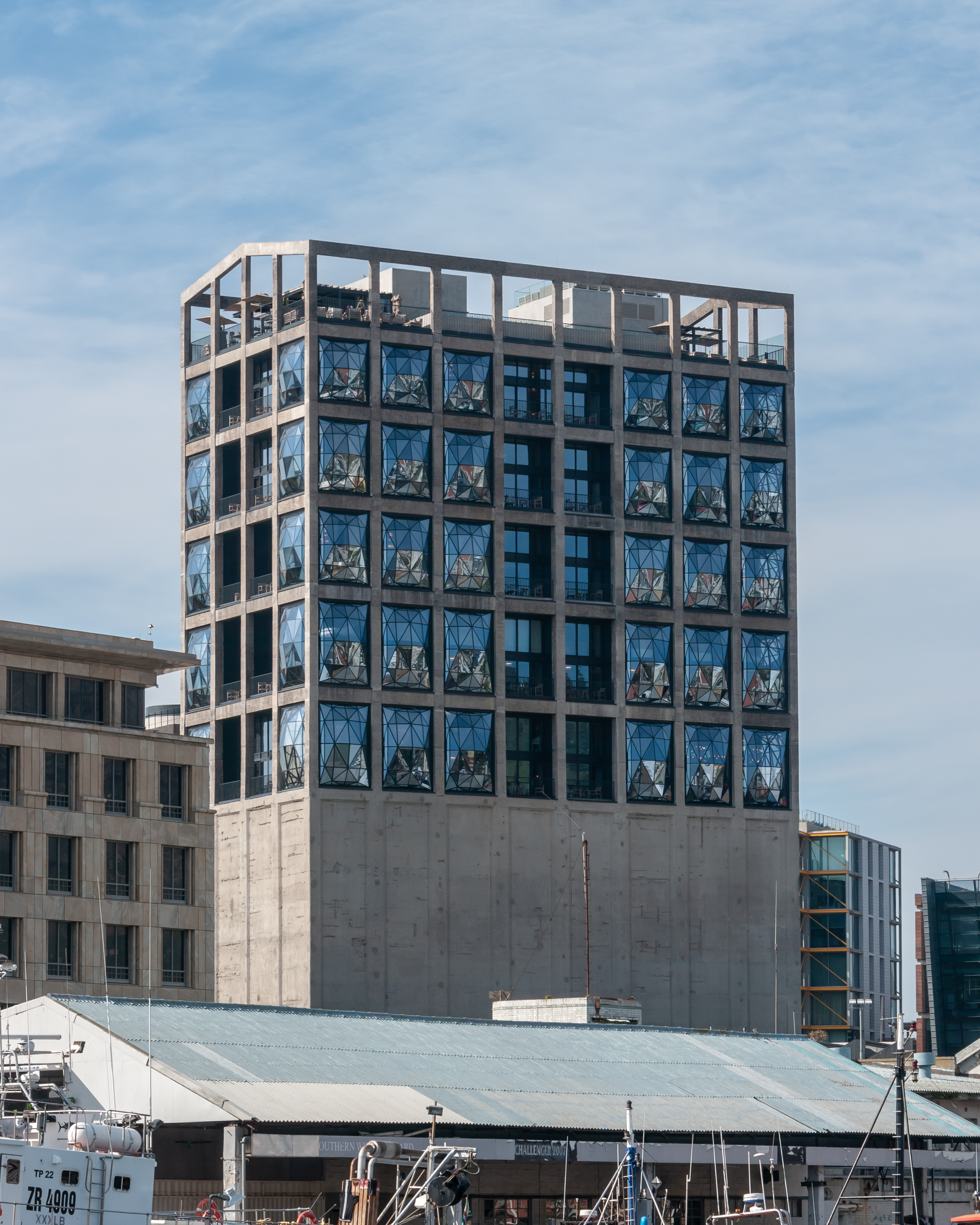
- Established: 2017; 9 years ago
- Location: V&A Waterfront, Silo District, South Arm Road, Waterfront, Cape Town, 8002, South Africa
- Coordinates: 33°54′30″S 18°25′23″E
- Type: Art museum, Design/Textile Museum, Historic site
- Founders: V&A Waterfront; Jochen Zeitz
- Executive director: Koyo Kouoh
- Website: www.zeitzmocaa.museum

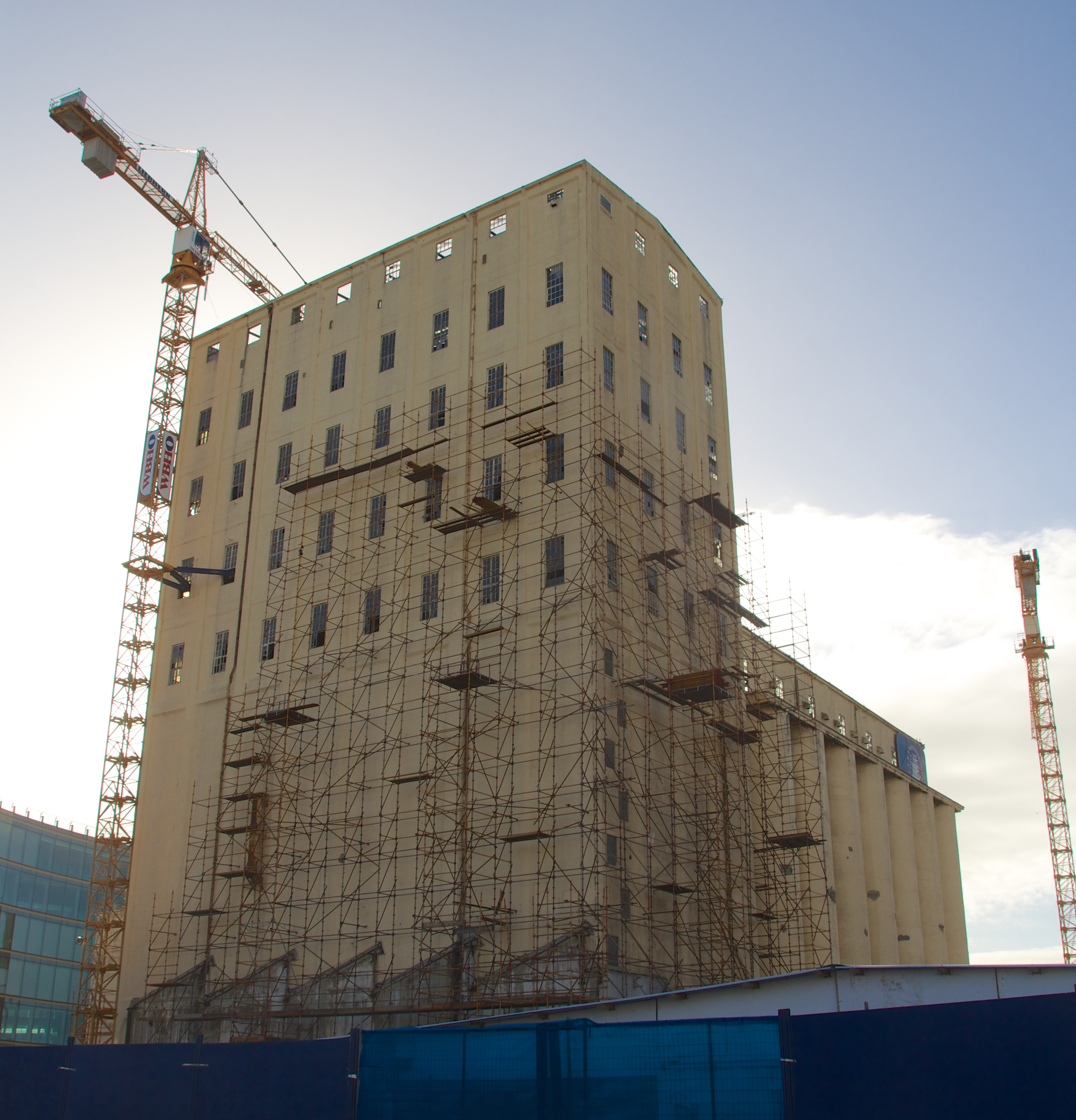
Zeitz MOCAA seen during the early stages of the Silo's conversion.

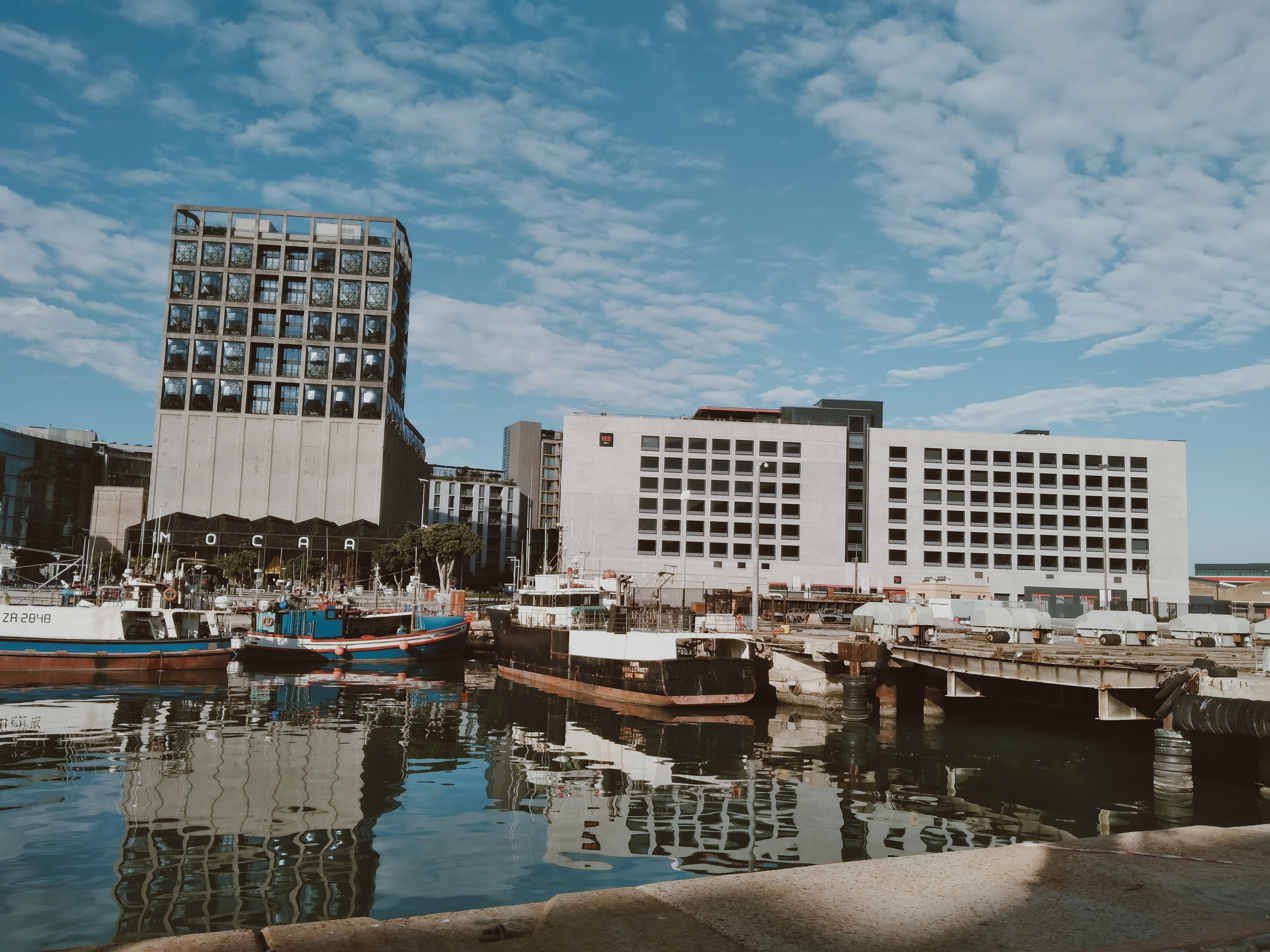
The Zeitz Museum of Contemporary Art Africa can be seen on the left with the Radisson Red Hotel on the right.

Zeitz Museum of Contemporary Art Africa (Zeitz MOCAA) is a public non-profit museum in Cape Town, South Africa. Zeitz MOCAA opened on September 22, 2017 as the largest museum of contemporary art from Africa and its diaspora. The museum is located in the Silo District at the Victoria & Alfred Waterfront in Cape Town. A retail and hospitality property, the Waterfront receives around 24 million local and international visitors per year.

The museum’s galleries feature temporary exhibitions and a permanent collection. The institution also includes the Centre for Art Education, a fellowship programme, an atelier artist residency, a retail shop, a rooftop restaurant, and a coffee shop.

== Leadership ==
Zeitz MOCAA founders are Mark Coetzee, Jochen Zeitz and the V&A Waterfront led by David Green. The latter two are the current Zeitz MOCAA co-chairs. As of 2021, the Board of Trustees includes Jochen Zeitz, David Green, Kate Garwood-Zeitz, Jonathan Bloch, Jody Allen, Atose Aguele, Hasnaine Yavarhoussen, Gasant Orrie as Legal Advisor, Gavin Jantjes as Honorary Trustee, with advisory council Albie Sachs, Isaac Julien, Wangechi Mutu. As of 6 May 2019 until her untimely passing in May 2025, Koyo Kouoh was the Executive Director and Chief Curator of Zeitz MOCAA. Storm Janse van Rensburg joined the museum on 2 September 2019 as Senior Curator and works alongside Assistant Curators Tandazani Dhlakama and Thato Mogotsi. Fawaz Mustapha functions as Chief Operating Officer. As of 2022, the Zeitz MOCAA Global Council includes Acha Leke, Bame Pule, Julie Mehretu, Michèle Sandoz, and Wangechi Mutu.

== Inception and development ==
The public not-for-profit museum was commissioned through a partnership between the V&A Waterfront and German businessman Jochen Zeitz. The Waterfront invested more than R500 million towards its construction and infrastructure development, and Zeitz has loaned his art collection for his lifetime.

According to CEO David Green, the decision to transform and renovate the building for the new museum would "breathe life into the Silo district and act as a draw card to a venture that is non-commercial in nature ... specifically for the enjoyment of all the continent’s citizens". While others have noted that the strategic partnership with Zeitz also serves to connect the existing properties of the Waterfronts's owners (Growthpoint Properties and the Government Employees Pension Fund) with the developing financial district in Cape Town's lower CBD.

== Architecture ==
The museum building was constructed from the conversion of the 57m tall historic grain silo, originally built between 1921 and 1924 by indentured labourers.

The architects, Heatherwick Studio, were introduced to the Grain Silo complex in 2006, and again in 2011, by Ravi Naidoo, founder of Design Indaba. They aimed to conserve and celebrate the original structure's industrial heritage, while simultaneously excavating large open spaces from the 42 densely-packed concrete cylinders from which it was comprised. The conversion of the silo building began in 2014 under the direction of London-based designer Thomas Heatherwick. Using a variety of concrete-cutting techniques, the interior of the building was carved out to create a number of galleries and a large central atrium. The remaining concrete shafts were capped with strengthened glass in order to allow natural light to enter and create a "cathedral-like" interior. From the exterior, the most noticeable change to the original structure was the addition of pillowed glass panels in the building's upper floors.

Overall the 9,500sqm museum consists of nine floors with 6,000sqm of dedicated exhibition space. as well as a sculpture garden on the lower roof, restaurant, retail shop and coffee shop. The higher part of the building operates as The Silo Hotel, which opened its doors in March 2017.

The building made it onto the Royal Institute of British Architects (RIBA) International List 2018.

== Exhibitions ==
=== The Five Continents of All Our Desires - Joël Andrianomearisoa ===
August 2, 2022 - July 25, 2023

=== Waiting For Gebane — Senzeni Marasela ===
December 18, 2020 - August 29, 2021

This was the first institutional solo exhibition of South African artist Senzeni Mthwakazi Marasela, a fact described as “almost unfathomable,” given the decades-long duration of the artist’s career. Her work in photography, photomontage, prints, textiles, embroidery, installation, and performance deals with history, memory, and personal narrative, and emphasises historical gaps and overlooked female figures. She almost exclusively uses the colour red to signify various Black feminist histories. Curated by Koyo Kouoh, Storm Janse Van Rensburg, and Tammy Langtry, the exhibition centres around Theodorah Mthetyane, Marasela’s fictional alter ego who was inspired by, and is a dedication to her mother and works as an avatar for the artist to live and explore the experiences of Black women in Africa.

=== Acts at the Crossroads — Otobong Nkanga ===
November 21, 2019 - February 23, 2020

This survey exhibition presented works made over 20 years by Nigerian-born, Belgium-based multidisciplinary artist Otobong Nkanga. Curated by Precious Mhone, the variety of works investigate the politics of the land and the body. Predominantly interested in the relationship and interconnectivity between the human-made and natural world, Nkanga works in various media including drawing, textile, installation, writing, and photography, incorporating natural materials like soil, plants, and stone.

== Group exhibitions ==
=== Indigo Waves and Other Stories: Re-Navigating the Afrasian Sea and Notions of Diaspora ===
June 30, 2022 - January 29, 2023

=== Home Is Where the Art Is ===
October 22, 2020 - October 21, 2021

As South Africa emerged from months of strict lockdown necessitated by the global Coronavirus pandemic, this exhibition was a non-juried, democratic celebration of art belonging to and made by the people of Cape Town. It encompassed nearly 2000 works by children, emerging and established artists, hobbyists, crafters, photographers, and masterworks from private collections, collected from several art deposit points around the Cape Town metropolitan area after a three-week open call. Installed salon-style on the third-floor of the museum, the exhibition was organised into thematic sections of The Garden, Outside, Inside, Relations, and Time. Characterised as a "love letter to Cape Town" in "homage to Cape Town's citizens" and an act of "cultural democracy", Home Is Where The Art Is was a radical revisioning of the role of the museum in civic life, directly enabling its constituents to be represented in a typically exclusive context. It was on display until 31 October 2021. On February 19, 2022, a publication titled Home Is Where The Art Is: Art Owned and Made by the People of Cape Town was launched at the Zeitz MOCAA booth at Investec Cape Town Art Fair, containing almost all of the works displayed in the exhibition, a social media and media archive, and written contributions by Zeitz MOCAA staff, Neo Maditla, and Ashraf Jamal.

=== Two Together ===
November 7, 2019 - March 26, 2023

Inaugurating a dedicated space for the permanent collection of Zeitz MOCAA on the fourth floor, this exhibition is organised around thought-provoking pairings. Explaining the exhibition, Chief Curator Koyo Kouoh says "This exhibition presents works from the Zeitz MOCAA Collection in a new way. Whilst some works will be familiar to regular visitors to the museum, the curation of the exhibition allows them all to be experienced anew."

=== And So the Stories Ran Away ===
September 8, 2019 - December 31, 2020

Presented by Zeitz MOCAA’s Centre for Arts Education in collaboration with The Michaelis School of Fine Art, The Ruth Prowse School of Art, and the Nyanga Arts Development Centre, And So the Stories Ran Away was an exhibition curated for an audience of children. Using interactive and multi-sensory experiences with art in the underground tunnels of the museum, the exhibition was based around African storytelling, taking its title from an Ekoi legend of a mouse who visits houses, gathering stories and weaving them together into new life forms. The exhibition was organised by museum educators Liesl Hartman and Richard Kilpert who also ran tours and workshops for children to further engage.

=== Five Bhobh: Painting at the End of an Era ===
September 12, 2018 - May 31, 2019

On the third level of the museum, this exhibition of works by 29 Zimbabwean artists defined "painting" in a broad sense, provided a synopsis of the medium's applications and histories within Zimbabwe. It was conceived by Zeitz MOCAA Assistant Curator Tandazani Dhlakama, who is from Zimbabwe herself. In the wake of Robert Mugabe's resignation from the office of the presidency after 37 years in power, the exhibition addressed the "End of an Era" through seven thematic sections, each offering perspectives on the state of painting and political subjectivity in Zimbabwe. The themes were: land, politics, memory, patonaz (Shona slang for "in town"), spirituality, kuDiaspora and shemurenga (a feminized play on "Chimurenga", the Shona word for "struggle"). Placing first in Hyperallergic's "Our Top 15 Exhibitions Around the World" for 2019, Five Bhobh "was able to capture not only the individual brilliance of each of the 29 artists, but it offered us insight into how their work clustered into relevant topics without feeling forced." Notable among the artists included were Berry Bickle, Cosmos Shiridzinomwa, Helen Teede, Kresiah Mukwazhi, Kufa Makwavarara, Misheck Masamvu, Portia Zvavahera, Rashid Jogee, Wallen Mapondera and Richard Mudariki with Mudariki's The Last Supper-inspired painting The Passover as a centrepiece of the exhibition. Accompanying the exhibition was Zeitz MOCAA's first comprehensive catalogue, also titled Five Bhobh: Painting at the End of an Era, and featuring written contributions by Azu Nwagbogu, Tandazani Dhlakama, Raphael Chikukwa, Doreen Sibanda, Helen Lieros, Derek Huggins, George Shire, heeten bhagat, and Hayden Proud.

=== All Things Being Equal... ===
September 22, 2017 - June 30, 2019

This inaugural exhibition displayed works from the Zeitz MOCAA permanent collection in galleries across the first three floors of the museum. Taking its title from a text work by African-American artist Hank Willis Thomas the exhibition offered answers to the question “How will I be represented in the museum?” by presenting a wide range of painting, sculpture, photography, installation, video, and drawing meant to speak to a plurality of African and Diasporic identities. Works by 41 artists were exhibited, including El Anatsui, Njideka Akunyili Crosby, Nicholas Hlobo, Rashid Johnson, Isaac Julien, William Kentridge, Glenn Ligon, Misheck Masamvu, Zanele Muholi, Wangechi Mutu, Chris Ofili, Athi-Patra Ruga, Mary Sibande, and Kehinde Wiley. All Things Being Equal... was curated by the museum's former Executive Director and Chief Curator Mark Coetzee and 12 Curatorial Assistants.

== Mobile Museum ==
Cape Town is a city where access to places such as Zeitz MOCAA is defined by disparity and often by audience demographic. The reasons are many and often complex: historical, economic, social, and educational with the global pandemic adding another layer of complexity. To address this, the Centre for Arts Education (CFAE) developed an education program called MOCAA On The Move taking art educators to schools and centres to teach art classes. As an extension of this, Zeitz MOCAA is currently developing a Mobile Museum to be a classroom on wheels. The Mobile Museum will be designed by Kenya-born South African architect and social activist Kevin Kimwelle highlighted by Metropolis Magazine in 2020 as a Gamer Changer. Kimwelle's first step has been to conduct research and workshops with community members and organizations. The Mobile Museum will focus on being sustainable and also on teaching sustainable practices. The Mobile Museum will launch in the Western Cape in 2023 with the goal of expanding to greater South Africa, and then through other countries on the African continent. “When you drive through Africa, you see that people make do with what they have. There is ingenuity there,” Kimwelle says.

== Lalela ==
The Centre for Art Education collaborates with Lalela, an every day after-school art programme hosted in the hours when children are most vulnerable to abuse. Classes are held on a weekly basis within the museum's classrooms to provide a safe space for workshops for students as young as six years old through to high school graduation.

== Fellowship Programme ==
In 2021, Zeitz MOCAA and the University of the Western Cape (UWC) announced a year-long Museum Fellowship Programme facilitated by the University of Western Cape’s faculty and courses conducted within the university's History Department and the Centre of Humanities Research. Five participants were selected for the first fellowship and include art historian and aspiring curator Rory Kahiya Tsapayi from Zimbabwe; artist, writer and curator Monique Du Plessis from South Africa; curator, writer, researcher and editor Mirembe from Uganda, curator and artist Motlalepula Phukubje from South Africa and artist Ange Frédéric Koffi from the Ivory Coast. The 2023 Museum Fellowship open call was announced in June 2022. As of August 2026 fellowship appointments for the 2027 Museum Fellowship Programme were under consideration.

== Ocular Lounge ==
The Ocular Lounge and Event Space is located on level 6 of the museum, and is an eatery and multi-functional space operated by The Aleit Group. The restaurant and venue offers 270-degree views of Cape Town, including Table Mountain, and also looks out onto the museum's rooftop terrace. The venue can accommodate up to 200 guests for dinner and hosts events ranging from brand activations to weddings to photo shoots.
