= Museum Arnhem =

Museum in Arnhem, Netherlands

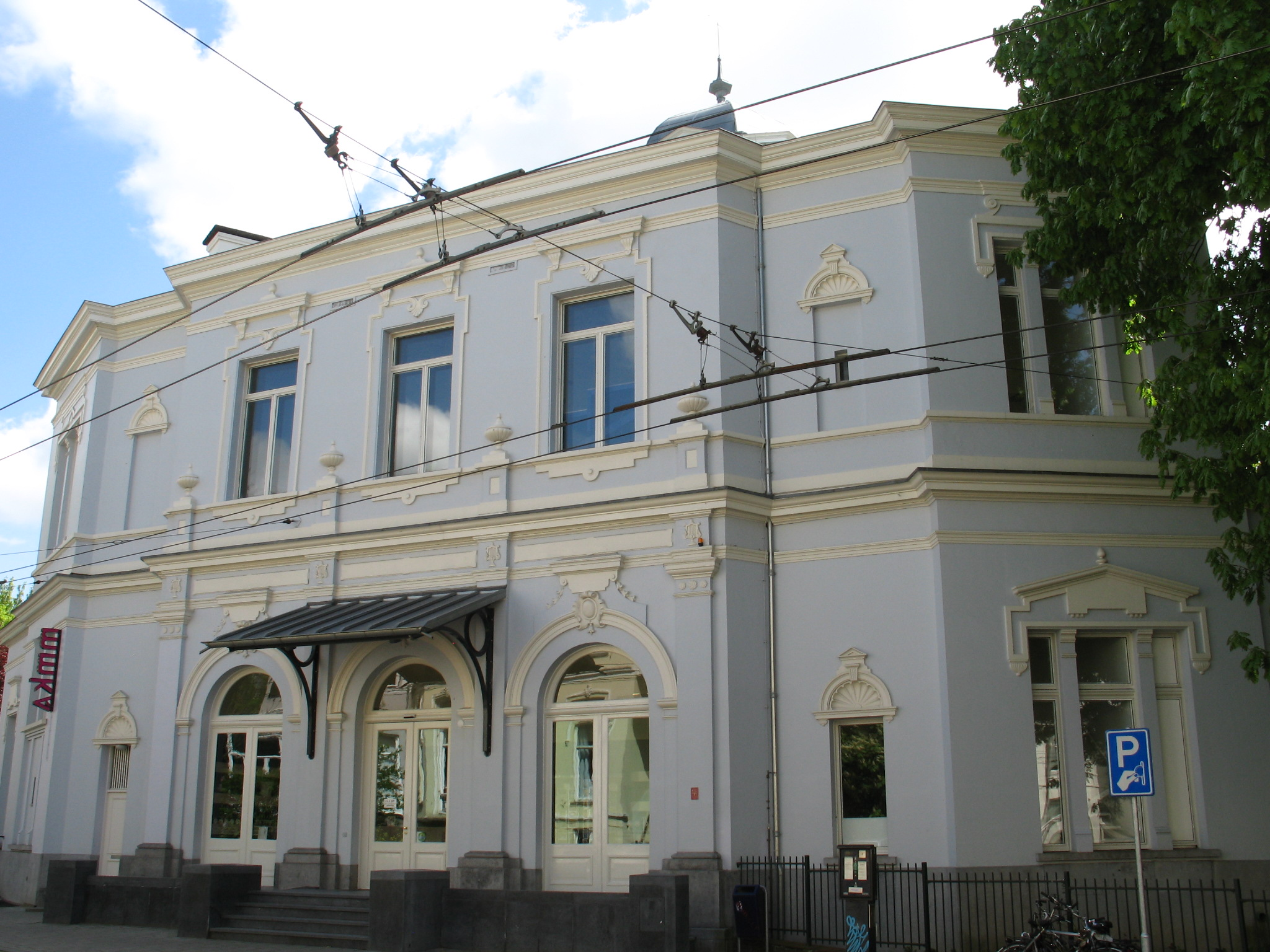
- Former names: Gemeentemuseum Arnhem; Museum voor Moderne Kunst Arnhem
- Location: Arnhem, Netherlands
- Coordinates: 51°59′07″N 05°53′32″E
- Architect: Cornelis Outshoorn

Museum Arnhem (formerly known as Gemeentemuseum Arnhem and then Museum voor Moderne Kunst Arnhem) is a museum of modern art, contemporary art, applied art and design in Arnhem, Netherlands, with art from the 20th century. The museum reopened its doors on 13 May 2022 after a major renovation that lasted more than four years.

Previous directors have included Liesbeth Brandt Corstius.
