= LiveWire (company) =

American electric motorcycle manufacturer

- Type: Public
- Traded as: NYSE: LVWR
- Industry: Motorcycles
- Founded: 2022; 4 years ago
- Headquarters: Milwaukee, Wisconsin; Mountain View, California
- Key people: Karim Donnez, CEO
- Products: Electric motorcycles
- Revenue: −US$38.023 million (2023)
- Operating income: −US$115.989 million (2023)
- Net income: −US$109.550 million (2023)
- Website: www.livewire.com

LiveWire is an American electric motorcycle manufacturer. It was initially launched as a dedicated electric vehicle (EV) division for Harley Davidson in July 2021. The company was spun-off from its parent and went public on September 27, 2022, via merger with a special-purpose acquisition company (SPAC). It was the first publicly traded electric motorcycle company in the United States.

The company operates dual headquarters at Milwaukee, Wisconsin and Mountain View, California.

== History ==
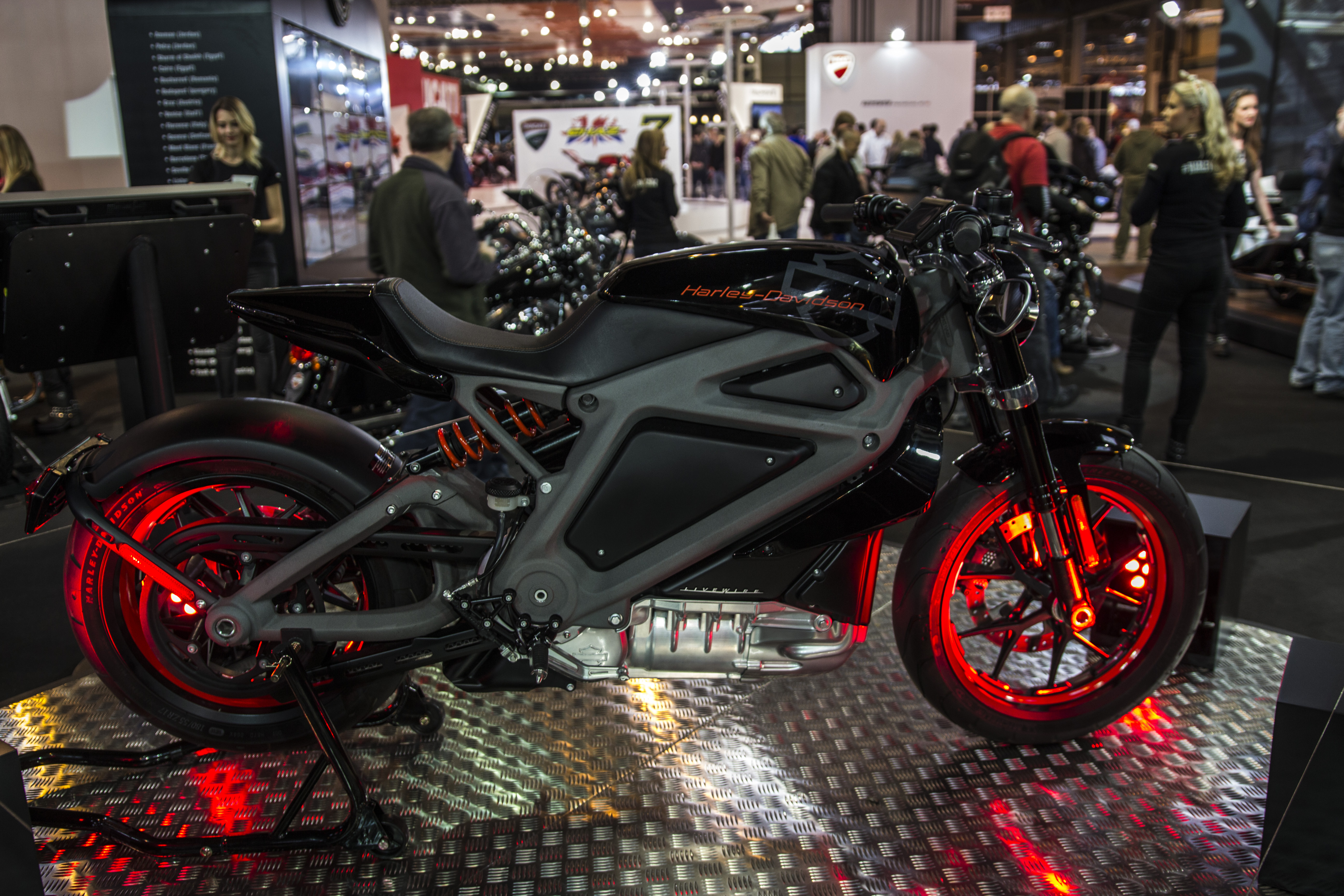
Harley Davidson LiveWire at Motorcycle Live 2014

The LiveWire electric motorcycle was first displayed to the media in June 2014, as part of Harley Davidson's Project LiveWire Experience, a traveling dealer demo. Prototypes were made available for public test rides at US Harley-Davidson dealerships later in 2014, then Europe and Canada in 2015.

In May 2021, Harley Davidson announced it was spinning LiveWire off as its own brand, including replacing the Harley Davidson logo on the motorcycles with the LiveWire logo. The first LiveWire branded motorcycle, named LiveWire ONE, was unveiled at the July 8 International Motorcycle Show in Sonoma, California. In December, Harley Davidson announced it was merging LiveWire with AEA-Bridges Impact Corp. (ABIC), a SPAC formed by private equity executives John Garcia and Michele Giddens, and it would begin publicly trading on the NYSE with ticker symbol "LVW". The deal was reportedly financed by $400 million of ABIC's cash held in trust, $100 million from Harley-Davidson, and $100 million from Taiwanese scooter manufacturer Kymco, through a private investment in public equity (PIPE) sale.

In the company's Q4 2021 earnings report, released in February 2022, it announced its next electric model, the LiveWire Del Mar, would be introduced in the second quarter.

== Products ==
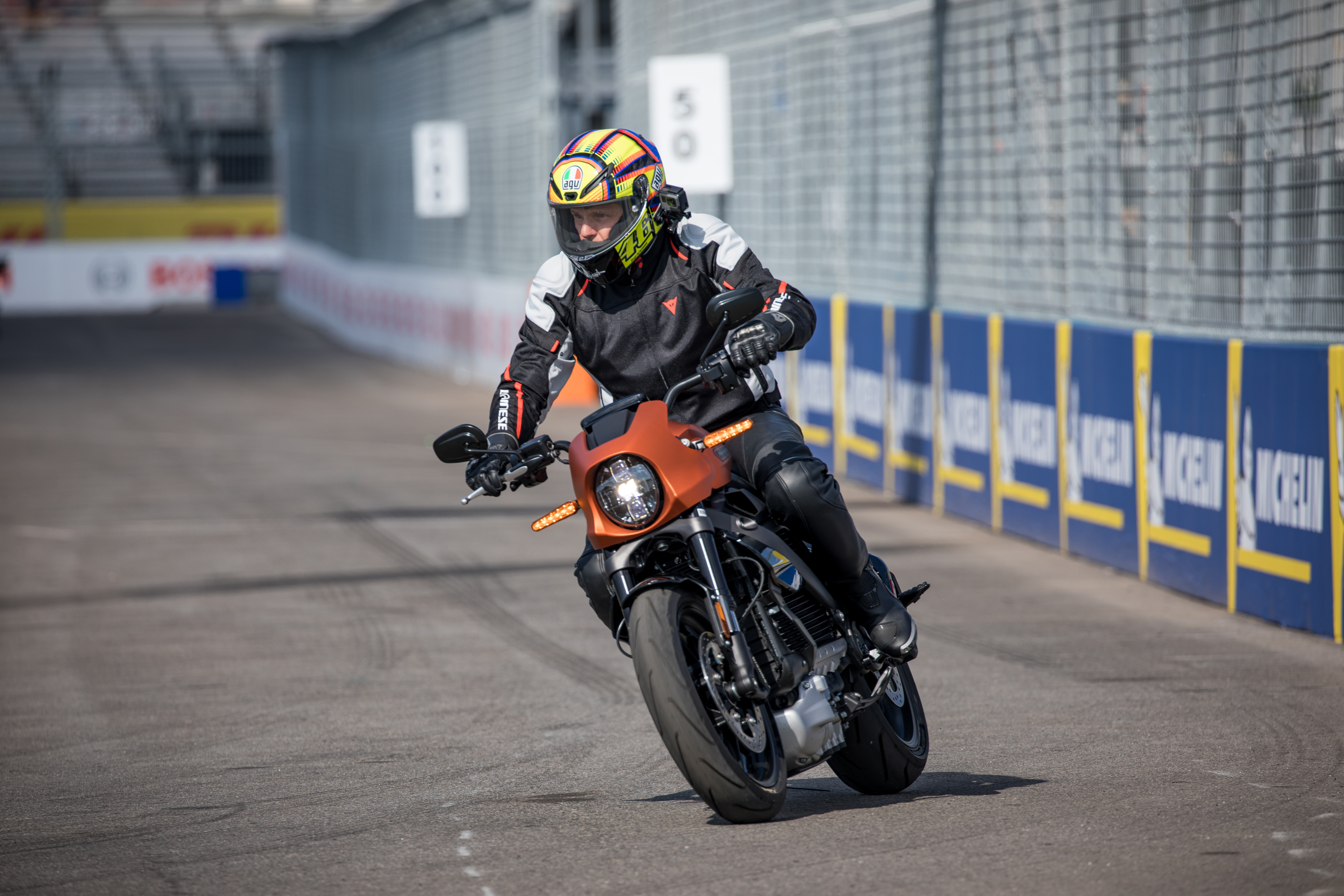
LiveWire ONE on the Formula E racetrack in New York in 2019

LiveWire manufactures the LiveWire brand of motorcycles. Its first product is the LiveWire ONE electric motorcycle. Electric motorcycles are seen as easier and quieter to ride than gas-powered motorcycles, with no clutch or gearshift, or hot exhaust pipes.

The company reportedly planned to develop three more electric models with a goal of manufacturing 100,000 motorcycles by 2026.

The company's second model, the LiveWire Del Mar, was announced in February 2022, and was reportedly the first to use LiveWire's scalable, modular ARROW platform. It was intended to be lighter and less expensive than the LiveWire One, and debuted in the US market at $15,500 MSRP.

In November 2024, Livewire announced enhancing their existing partnership with Powersports company KYMCO to produce the Maxi-Scooter, utilizing the same ARROW powertrain as their current S2 product line. The LiveWire Maxi-Scooter is expected to debut in the first half of 2026.

== Sales ==
In February 2025 the company published sales results from 2023 and 2024, with a slight decline from 660 to 612 motorcycle units for each year.

== Operations ==
The company operates dual headquarters at Milwaukee, Wisconsin and Mountain View, California. Its motorcycles are manufactured in York, Pennsylvania at Harley Davidson's plant. The company reportedly plans to continue to work with Harley Davidson dealers, and is also reportedly planning dedicated LiveWire showrooms, starting in California.

As of January 2022, Harley Davidson Chairman and CEO Jochen Zeitz was continuing to lead LiveWire as a separate corporate entity and was the acting CEO, while Ryan Morrissey was the company's president.

== See also ==
- List of Harley-Davidson motorcycles
