= Tandazani Dhlakama =

Zimbabwean curator and museum professional

Tandazani Dhlakama is a Zimbabwean Curator and museum professional. She is the Curator of Global Africa at the Royal Ontario Museum (ROM) in Toronto, Canada. Dhlakama is known for her work on African and diasporic art, as well as for her curatorial roles at the Zeitz Museum of Contemporary Art Africa (Zeitz MOCAA) in Cape Town, South Africa.

== Early life and education ==
Dhlakama was born in Zimbabwe. She holds a Masters of Arts in Art Gallery and Museum Studies from the University of Leeds in the United Kingdom, and a Bachelor of Arts degree in Fine Art and Political Science from St. Lawrence University in the United States.

== Career ==
=== National Gallery of Zimbabwe ===
Before working internationally, Dhlakama served as Curator of Education and Public Programming at the National Gallery of Zimbabwe in Harare. In this role, she contributed to exhibitions, educational initiatives, and public engagement programmes aimed at supporting contemporary art practice in Zimbabwe.

In Harare, Dhlakama co-curated These Images Are Stories (2017) in collaboration with the British Council Zimbabwe, Zimbo Jam and Impact Hub Islington in Harare. Dhlakama worked as a curator at Tsoko Gallery, an independent art space in Harare, where she curated their inaugural exhibition, Beyond the Body (2016) and was involved in the establishment of the space. Dhlakama has worked as Gallery Assistant at the Richard F. Brush Art Gallery, St. Lawrence University (2008–2011) and interned at Microspazio Disponibile Art Gallery, Italy (2009); Tizianos Art-Kreemart, USA (2011); and East Street Arts, UK (2015).

Dhlakama was part of the curatorial team for the 13th Bamako Encounters—African Biennale of Photography (2022) in Mali. She curated Witness: Afro Perspectives from the Jorge M. Pérez Collection at El Espacio 23 (2020).

She was an advisor and contributor to African Artists: From 1882 to Now, by Phaidon (2021) and also serves as a member of the NESR Foundation Artistic Committee in Luanda.

Dhlakama has participated in various curatorial intensives in Africa, including the Independent Curators International (ICI) Curatorial Intensive in Dakar, Senegal (2016), the Zeitz MOCAA Curatorial Training Program in Cape Town, South Africa (2015) and the New Ideas, New Possibilities Curatorial Forum and Workshop in Bulawayo, Zimbabwe (2013).

=== Zeitz MOCAA ===
In 2017, Dhlakama joined the Zeitz Museum of Contemporary Art Africa (Zeitz MOCAA) in Cape Town, where she held several curatorial positions, including Assistant Curator. During her tenure, she worked within the curatorial team led by Koyo Kouoh, who was the museum's Executive Director and Chief Curator.

At Zeitz MOCAA, Dhlakama curated and co-curated a number of major exhibitions, including Five Bhobh: Painting at the End of an Era (2018); When We See Us: A Century of Black Figuration in Painting (co-curator, 2022); Shooting Down Babylon: A Tracey Rose Retrospective (co-curator, 2022); and Seekers, Seers, Soothsayers (2023).

She was also involved in institutional research, editorial projects, and the establishment of the Zeitz MOCAA–University of the Western Cape Museum Fellowship Programme in 2021.

=== Royal Ontario Museum ===
In January 2025, Dhlakama was appointed Curator of Global Africa at the Royal Ontario Museum. In this role, she oversees the interpretation, research, and exhibition development of the museum's African and African diasporic collections and contributes to public programming and institutional strategy related to Global Africa.

== Curatorial practice ==
Dhlakama's curatorial practice centers on African and diasporic perspectives, decolonial museum methodologies, and the relationship between historical collections and contemporary artistic practice. Her work frequently engages questions of representation, memory, and global African identities.

Dhlakama has been a jury member for the Sony World Photography Awards, London (2023), Contemporary African Photography Prize (2023) and was part of the 2021 Pérez Prize Nominating Team, Miami (2021).

In 2026 Dhlakama was named among the 50 African Influential Curators of 2025.

== Selected exhibitions ==
- Five Bhobh: Painting at the End of an Era (Zeitz MOCAA, 2018)
- Witness: Afro Perspectives from the Jorge M. Pérez Collection (Miami, 2020).
- When We See Us: A Century of Black Figuration in Painting (Zeitz MOCAA, 2022).
- Shooting Down Babylon: A Tracey Rose Retrospective (Zeitz MOCAA, 2022).
- Seekers, Seers, Soothsayers (Zeitz MOCAA, 2023)

== See also ==
- Koyo Kouh
- Raphael Chikukwa
- Zeitz MOCAA
- National Gallery of Zimbabwe
