= Koyo Kouoh =

Cameroonian art curator (1967–2025)

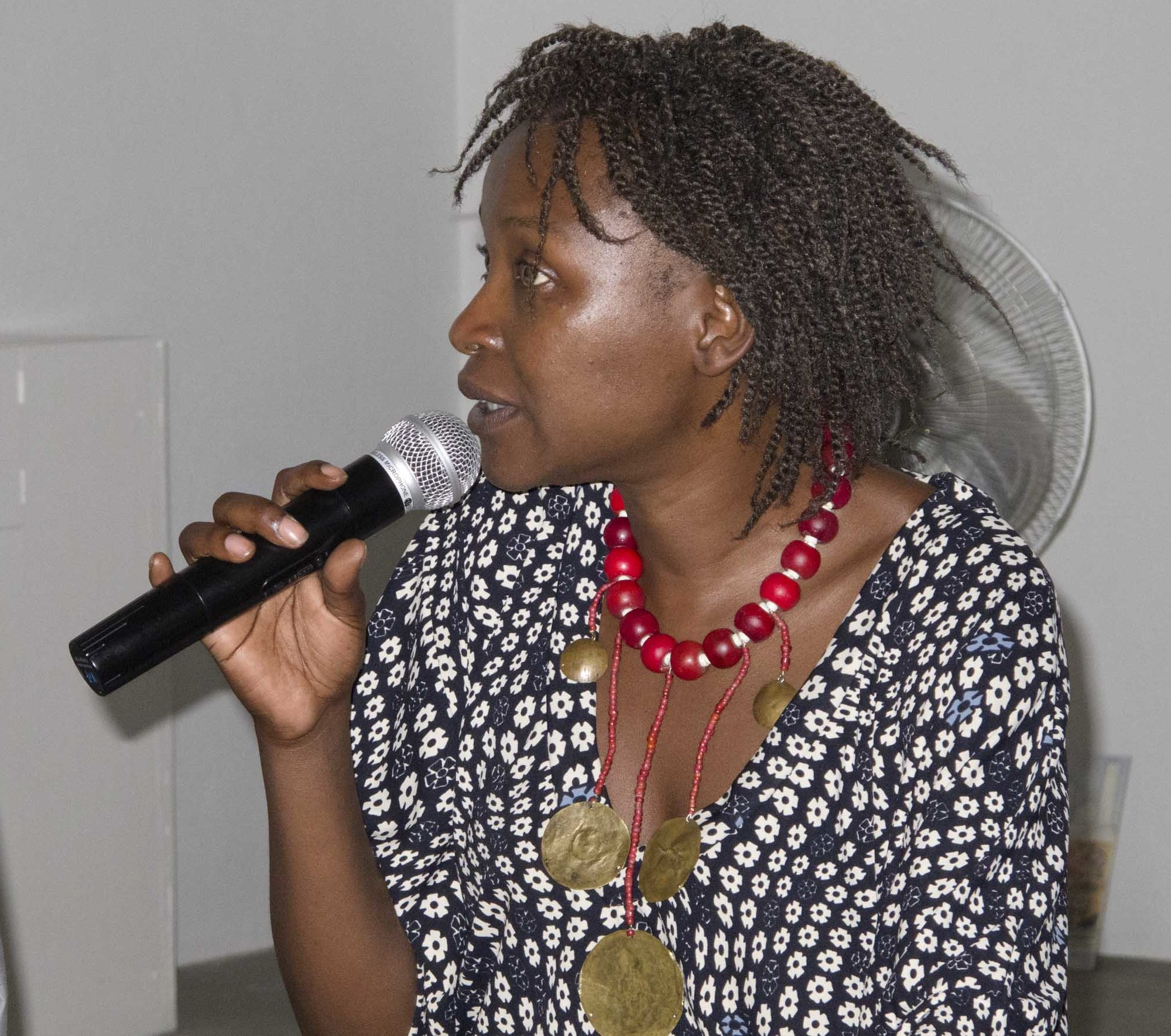
- Kouoh in 2010
- Born: Marie-Nöelle Koyo Kouoh; 24 December 1967; Douala, Cameroon
- Died: 10 May 2025 (aged 57); Basel, Switzerland
- Occupations: Art curator and manager
- Known for: Executive director of Zeitz MOCAA
- Children: 4
- Awards: The Swiss Grand Award for Art; Prix Meret Oppenheim

Koyo Kouoh (24 December 1967 – 10 May 2025) was a Cameroonian-Swiss art curator who served as Executive Director and Chief Curator of the Zeitz Museum of Contemporary Art Africa in Cape Town, South Africa, from 2019 onwards. In 2015, The New York Times described her as "one of Africa's pre-eminent art curators and managers", and from 2014 to 2022, she was annually named one of the 100 most influential people in the contemporary art world by ArtReview.

Kouoh was raised in Cameroon and later Switzerland. As an adult, she moved to Dakar, Senegal, to build an art career, working as an independent curator and founding an artist's residency and exhibition space, the RAW Material Company. In 2019, she was appointed the director of the recently opened Zeitz Museum of Contemporary Art Africa, in Cape Town, South Africa, and as its head "positioned the museum at the cutting edge of contemporary art by championing Pan-Africanism and promoting artists from the continent and its diaspora." She was appointed to serve as the 2026 Venice Biennale's artistic director until her sudden death in May 2025.

== Early life and education ==
Koyo Kouoh was born on 24 December 1967, in Douala, Cameroon. She lived in Douala until the age of 13, and moved with her family to Zurich, Switzerland, where she stayed for the next decade and a half. She studied business administration and banking in Zurich, as well as cultural management in France. She was fluent in French, German, English, and Italian.

Inspired by Margaret Busby's groundbreaking 1992 anthology Daughters of Africa: An International Anthology of Words and Writings by Women of African Descent, Kouoh began to focus on writing and editing. As she later recalled: "[That anthology] was essential to my understanding of the power of the imaginary. And above all, to the contribution of women and the importance of their voices. Living in a German-speaking space where African voices are even less heard, I made the decision to undertake an editorial project that would aim at doing, in the German-speaking world, what Busby had done in the English speaking one." In 1994, Kouoh co-edited Töchter Afrikas, a German-language companion to Daughters of Africa, which was a collection of writings by women of the African diaspora.

The following year, she travelled to Dakar, Senegal, to interview filmmaker Ousmane Sembène. After encountering the city's art scene, including meeting painter Issa Samb, and frustrated with anti-black racism in Europe, Kouoh decided to move to Dakar and pursue an art-related career.

== Curatorial career ==
Kouoh initially worked as a cultural officer for the U.S. Consulate and as an independent curator. In 2000, she met South African artist Tracey Rose and Nigerian-Belgian artist Otobong Nkanga, both whom Kouoh would feature in many future exhibitions. In 2001 and 2003, Kouoh served as co-curator – alongside writer Simon Njami – on Les Rencontres de la Photographie Africaine in Bamako, a photography biennial held in Mali. She also helped to reform and collaborated with the Dakar Biennale from 2000 to 2004.

From 2008 until 2019, Kouoh served as the founding artistic director of RAW Material Company, a Dakar artist's residency, exhibition space, and academy. Over the following decade, RAW built a reputation for quality exhibitions and became a respected cultural centre. In 2014, the group faced controversy for an exhibition titled Personal Liberties, which included LGBT stories. When local Muslim leaders protested and the RAW building was vandalized, RAW decided to cancel the show.

Kouoh served as curatorial adviser for Documenta 12 (2007) and 13 (2012) and the EVA International (Republic of Ireland's biennial of contemporary art) in 2016. For the latter, she organized a show based on postcolonial themes, in part to celebrate the centenary of the Easter Rising, with the exhibition's title, Still (the) Barbarians, referencing the poem "Waiting for the Barbarians" by Greek author Constantine P. Cavafy. Among the artists included were Kader Attia, Liam Gillick, Abdoulaye Konaté, Alice Maher, and Tracey Rose. Art critic Niamh NicGhabhann described it as "[engaging] in an elegant, assured, often furious debate with the ideas of 1916".

Kouoh was involved in the development of the 1:54 contemporary African art fair since its 2013 inception at Somerset House in London, curating the 1:54 FORUM programme of lectures and seminars, first held in New York in 2015.

In 2015, she curated Body Talk: Feminism, Sexuality and the Body in the Works of Six African Women Artists, which opened at WIELS contemporary art centre in Brussels and was also mounted at the Lunds Konsthall in Sweden. The show – which subsequently opened at the FRAC Lorraine in Metz, France – prompted The New York Times to state: "Over the last two decades Ms. Kouoh has become one of Africa's preeminent curators and art managers through a combination of a relaxed demeanor, a sharp eye, a gift for languages (she is fluent in French, German, English and Italian, and knows some Russian) and a keen interest in all aspects of the arts."

Kouoh was on the search committee that chose the Polish curator Adam Szymczyk as artistic director for documenta 14 in 2017.

In 2021, Kouoh was invited by French President Emmanuel Macron to a conference about the restitution of African artefacts, when she pressed him for more efforts to right past wrongs, and said: "Our imagination was violated."

Kouoh was part of the jury that selected Shu Lea Cheang as recipient of the LG Guggenheim Award in March 2024.

In December 2024, Kouoh was appointed curator of the 61st Venice Art Biennale, announcement of the exhibition's title and theme being scheduled to take place in Venice on 20 May 2025, with the opening set for 9 May 2026. She was the first African woman to have been chosen to curate the Biennale.

== Zeitz MOCAA ==
The Zeitz Museum of Contemporary Art Africa (Zeitz MOCAA) in Cape Town, South Africa—the African continent's largest museum—opened in 2017, built around the art collection of philanthropist Jochen Zeitz. However, the following year, its director, Mark Coetzee, was suspended following accusations of sexual harassment. Kouoh was appointed his replacement as Zeitz MOCAA's executive director and chief curator in 2019.

At the time of Kouoh's arrival, according to one newspaper report, "morale was low and exhibitions lackluster." Over the next year, Kouoh expanded the curatorial team and the board of trustees, as well as adding artist residency programs. After a COVID-19 related closure, the museum re-opened to much greater audiences. In her curation, Kouoh emphasized solo retrospectives and believed that it is the most effective way to tell artists' stories. Retrospectives that she organized include Mary Evans, Tracey Rose, and Johannes Phokela. The Rose retrospective also toured to the Queens Museum, where a review in The New York Times described it as dealing with "post-colonial complexities, such as repatriation, recompense and reckoning". As The Art Newspaper has stated: "The Rose exhibition reflected [Kouoh's] determination to mount African single-artist exhibitions and her focus on female artists, on Black feminism and Black female artists."

Notable exhibitions mounted under Kouoh's leadership at Zeitz MOCAA championed Pan-African narratives, among them When We See Us: A Century of Black Figuration in Painting (2022–2023), which traveled to BOZAR, Brussels.

In her mission to showcase the work of artists from the African continent and its diaspora, Kouoh used the term "Black geographies", to include all parts of the world "where African and Afro-diasporic cultures have been transported, often involuntarily, but where they have evolved, transformed and taken root, whether artistically, intellectually, spiritually or ideologically. These territories become extensions of the continent, places of connection and dialogue."

== Personal life ==
Kouoh was married. She had one biological son and three adopted children. She lived in South Africa and Switzerland.

=== Death and legacy ===
Kouoh died suddenly at a hospital in Basel, Switzerland, on 10 May 2025, at the age of 57. As reported by The New York Times, her husband, Philippe Mall, said she had a very recent cancer diagnosis. She had been set to serve as the director of the 2026 Venice Biennale. A statement issued by the Biennale stated: "Her passing leaves an immense void in the world of contemporary art and in the international community of artists, curators, and scholars who had the privilege of knowing and admiring her extraordinary human and intellectual commitment." Zeitz MOCAA's tribute said: "Her vision, passion, and indomitable spirit shaped the soul of this museum. She leaves behind a legacy that has forever changed the landscape of contemporary African art."

In a posthumously published article Kouoh had written for The Guardian, she concluded:

"Ultimately, my role as the first African woman to curate the biennale is not about personal legacy. While I recognise the significance of being the first African woman to hold this position, I hope my appointment sets a precedent rather than becoming an exception. My vision is for a future where such milestones are no longer remarkable, simply because so many others have followed. The real measure of progress is not in being first but in ensuring the door remains wide open for those who come next."

Among many tributes to the impact she made, one in Art Africa magazine stated: "Kouoh redefined what it means to curate with political consciousness and deep integrity. She expanded the possibilities for artists and ideas from the African continent and the Global South, reshaping the narratives of contemporary art history."

The first UK solo exhibition by Joanne Leonard at HackelBury Fine Art studio in London, Vintage Photographs and Early Collages (29 May – 8 July 2025) is "dedicated with respect and admiration to Koyo Kouoh, a visionary curator, cultural thinker, and advocate for the transformative power of art."

== Other activities ==
- German Academic Exchange Service (DAAD), member of the board
- The Vera List Center for Art and Politics at The New School, member of the 2018–2020 prize jury
- Celeste Prize, member of the board
- Zeitz Museum of Contemporary Art Africa, member of the Curatorial Advisory Group (2018–2019)
- Teaching and workshops, such as Forecast mentorship in Berlin

== Recognition ==
From 2014 to 2022, Kouoh was annually named one of the 100 most influential people in the contemporary art world by ArtReview, peaking at No. 32 in 2020.

In 2020, Kouoh received The Swiss Grand Award for Art / Prix Meret Oppenheim, which honours achievements in the fields of art, architecture, critique, and exhibitions.

== Publications ==
- Condition Report on Building Art Institutions in Africa (2012)
- Word!Word?Word! Issa Samb and The Undecipherable Form (2013)
- Condition Report on Art History in Africa (2020)
- Breathing Out of School: RAW Académie (2021)
- When We See Us: A Century of Black Figuration in Painting (as editor; 2022)
- Shooting Down Babylon (2022), monograph on the work of Tracey Rose
