= Liesbeth Brandt Corstius =

Dutch art historian (1940–2022)

- Born: 8 November 1940; Utrecht, Netherlands
- Died: 12 August 2022 (aged 81); Arnhem, Netherlands
- Occupations: Art historian and museum director

Liesbeth Brandt Corstius (8 November 1940 – 12 August 2022) was a Dutch art historian, feminist and museum director.

Brandt Corstius became director of the Museum Arnhem. From the year of her appointment she changed the policy of reserving at least half of the purchases and presentations for female artists. On 8 March 1994, Brandt Corstius received the Aletta Jacobsprijs (Aletta Jacobs prize) for her commitment to female artists. From 1996 she was involved in the expansion of the museum that was opened in 2000.

Brandt Corstius died in Arnhem on 12 August 2022, aged 81.
