= Raphael Chikukwa =

Raphael Chikukwa (born 1970) is a Zimbabwean curator and the Executive Director of the National Gallery of Zimbabwe since 2020. Prior to this, he was Chief Curator at the same institution and before that he has worked for a decade as an independent curator. Chikukwa is a Chevening Scholar who holds an MA in Curating Contemporary Design from Kingston University London.

== Early life and education ==
Chikukwa was trained at the Harare Art Centre in Mbare.

== Career ==
Chikukwa volunteered at the second Johannesburg Biennale in 1997 working under Okwui Enwezor. He then spent the next decade working as an independent curator. Chikukwa studied and trained in Europe before he was appointed Curator of the National Gallery of Zimbabwe. While there he was the founding curator of the Zimbabwean Pavilion at the 54th Venice Biennale in 2011, and he organized the country's representation in 2013, 2015, 2017, 2019 and 2022.

Chikukwa was appointed Executive Director of the National Gallery of Zimbabwe in 2020. In 2021, he was a member of the visual arts jury for the annual DAAD Artists-in-Berlin Program.

In 2026 Chukukwa and Tandazani Dhlamaka, also from Zimbabwe, were named on the list of 50 Influential Curators in Africa.

== Publications ==
- Face to Face (National Gallery of Zimbambwe, Harare, 2003)
- Visions of Zimbabwe (Manchester City Art Galleries, 2004)
- Mawonero/Umbono: Insights on Art in Zimbabwe (Kerber Verlag, 2016)
- Kabbo Ka Muwala: Migration and Mobility in Contemporary Art (Revolver, 2017)
