= Theo McNab =

Irish painter

- Born: 1940; Dublin, Ireland
- Died: 2015 (aged 74–75)
- Known for: oil painting
- Style: Abstract expressionism, minimalism
- Elected: Aosdána (1981)

Theodore "Theo" McNab (1940–2015) was an Irish painter, known for his minimalist landscapes. He was a member of Aosdána, an elite Irish association of artists.

== Early life ==
McNab was born in Dublin in 1940.

== Career ==
McNab never received formal artistic training, being largely self-taught.

His works often depict grid structures, similar to Charles Tyrrell. McNab first exhibited in 1971 in Dublin and had a one-man show in 1973. He won the Scott Tallon Walker Prize at the Oireachtas Exhibition in 1976. His work was shown at Rosc in 1980. He was elected to Aosdána in 1981.

McNab was head of Fine Arts at the National College of Art and Design (NCAD, Dublin) from 1988 to 2000. His work is at the Irish Museum of Modern Art, the Hugh Lane Gallery , and the University of Limerick's collection.

McNab died in 2015.
