= Jochen Zeitz =

German businessman (born 1963)

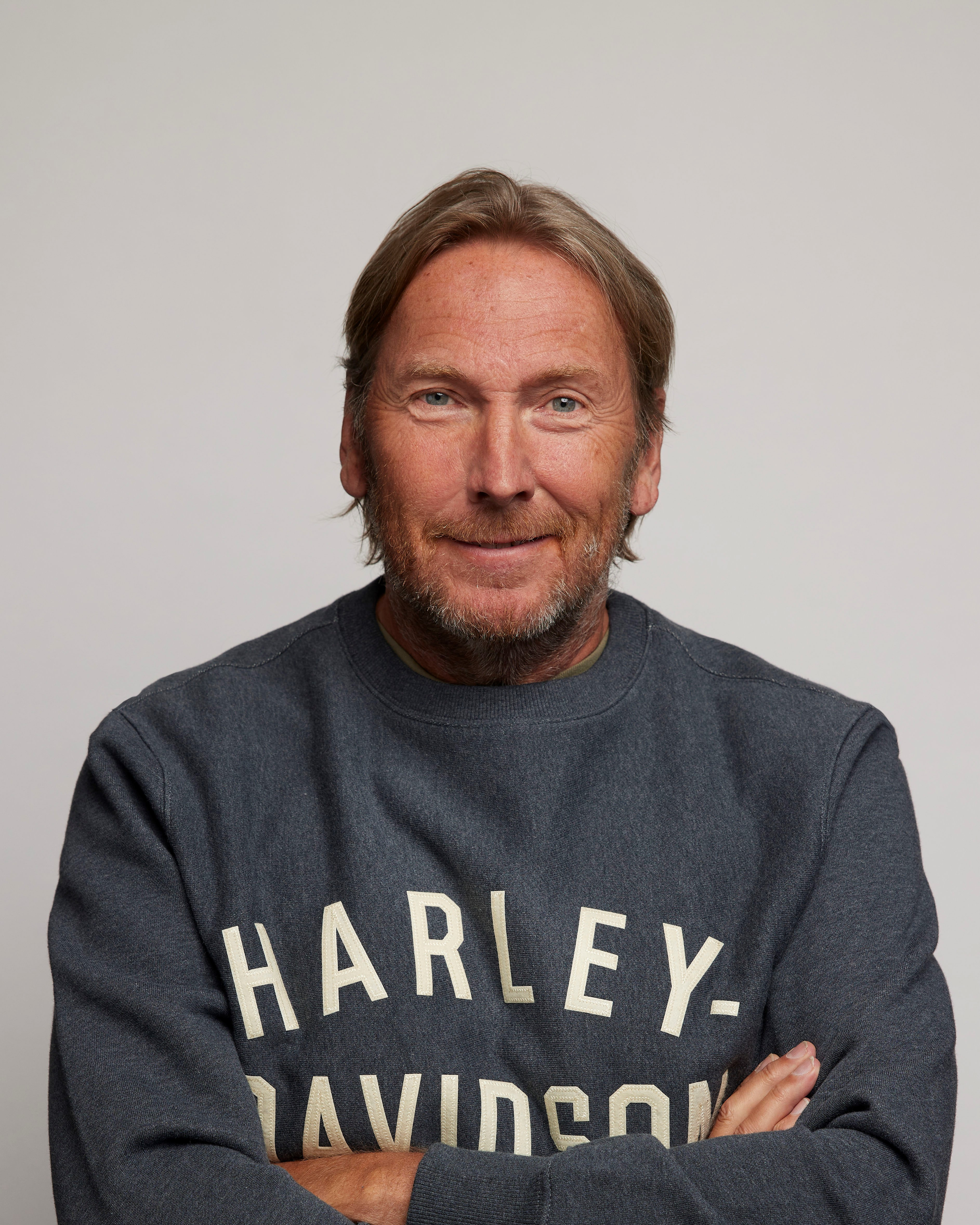
- Born: Jochen Zeitz; 6 April 1963 (age 63); Mannheim, Germany
- Education: European Business School
- Title: Former chairman and CEO of Puma, former chairman, president and CEO of Harley-Davidson, Inc., former chairman of LiveWire, Inc.
- Spouse: Kate Garwood
- Children: 2

Jochen Zeitz (born 6 April 1963) is a former businessman who served as the chairman and CEO of Puma for 18 years, and served as chairman, president and CEO of Harley-Davidson and LiveWire. He also served as a board member of Kering, the luxury goods company and chaired their sustainability committee, for whom he developed its global sustainability strategy. Zeitz is currently a board member of The B Team and Cranemere.

Zeitz previously served on the board of Wilderness Safaris and on the board of the Kenya Wildlife Service (KWS) for three years from 2019 to 2022. Zeitz is also the co-founder of The B Team with Richard Branson, and the Zeitz Museum of Contemporary Art Africa.

== Early life and education ==
Zeitz was born on 6 April 1963 in Mannheim, Germany. He studied in Germany, Italy, France, and the United States, and graduated from the European Business School in International Marketing and Finance.

== Career ==
Zeitz began his professional career with Colgate-Palmolive in New York and Hamburg. In May 2020, Zeitz was appointed president and chief executive officer of Harley-Davidson after serving as acting CEO from February of that year. Prior to joining Harley-Davidson, he was chief executive officer and chief financial officer of Puma, where he oversaw the company’s international expansion.

=== Puma ===
He joined Puma in 1990, and in 1993 was appointed chairman and CEO, becoming, at the age of 30, the youngest CEO in German history to head a public company. He then led the worldwide restructuring of Puma, which was in financial difficulties at the time, and implemented a long-term development plan that saw Puma's share price gain around 4,000 percent in 13 years, from €8.6 in his first year as CEO to an all-time high of €350 when the majority stake of the company was acquired by Kering in 2007.

In 2008, Zeitz introduced PUMAVision, an ethical framework defined by the four key principles of being fair, honest, positive and creative as applied to all professional behaviour, business procedures and relationships throughout and outside of Puma. At PUMA, he also conceived of the concept of an Environmental Profit & Loss Account (EP&L Account).

In May 2011, he announced Puma's EP&L Account, which assigned a monetary value to its businesses use of ecosystem services across its entire supply chain.

From 2010 to 2012, Zeitz was CEO of Puma's Sport & Lifestyle division, which included Puma and Volcom, was its chief sustainability officer (CSO), and then served as chairman of the board's sustainable development committee, and a director of Kering.

=== Harley-Davidson ===
Zeitz became a member of the Board of Directors of Harley-Davidson in 2007, and served as the chair of Harley-Davidson's sustainability committee since its inception in 2011. Known for "proven turnaround" skills, Zeitz assumed the helm of Harley-Davidson, first as interim CEO in February 2020, and took over the job permanently in May 2020, succeeding Matthew S. Levatich.

In July 2020, Zeitz announced "The Rewire" which led to a new five-year strategic plan called "The Hardwire". The Rewire strategy included prioritizing markets that matter and enhancing core strengths of the company, while balancing expansion into new spaces. The Hardwire strategy included a new pre-owned motorcycle program; investment in the parts, accessories, riding gear and financial services segments of the business; and a new division focused exclusively on electric motorcycles.

In February 2021, inspired by KKR & Co Inc executive Pete Stavros, Zeitz announced the motorcycle maker would give stock grants to employees, including hourly and factory workers, to align with executives and shareholders.

In December 2021, Zeitz announced that LiveWire, the electric-motorcycle division of Harley-Davidson, would become a separate publicly traded company to "operate with the same agility and speed as a startup"; the company went public on the New York Stock Exchange (NYSE) on 27 September 2022. On the day of listing, Zeitz was the first CEO to ring both the opening and closing bell of trading on the NYSE, also being the first to run two public-listed companies.

Serving as Livewire's first chairman and CEO since going public, he handed over leadership on 12 June 2023 to his successor Karim Donnez, while remaining as chairman of the company.

In April 2025, Zeitz announced his intention to retire from Harley-Davidson after five years as CEO, subject to the appointment of a suitable successor. In August 2025, it was confirmed that Zeitz would retire from the company on October 1, 2025.

== Philanthropy ==
In 2008 Zeitz founded the not-for-profit Zeitz Foundation for Intercultural Ecosphere Safety to support creative and innovative sustainable projects and solutions that balance conservation, community development, culture, and commerce (the "4Cs") in a quadruple bottom line approach, promoting an inclusive, holistic paradigm of conservation that enhances livelihoods and fosters intercultural dialogue while building sustainable businesses. Owner of Segera Conservancy (including its eco-safari retreat that is a founding Long Run Destination), Zeitz preserves 50,000 acres of wildlife habitat in Kenya which follows the 4C approach to support its local communities and provide a safe refuge for endangered wildlife.

Founded by Jochen Zeitz and the ZEITZ foundation in 2009, The Long Run is a membership organisation of nature-based tourism businesses that are committed to driving sustainability through a holistic 4C philosophy. Safeguarding over 21 million acres of nature in 22 different countries, touching the lives of over 750,000 people and protecting over 30,000 plant and animal species, The Long Run is a global membership organization focused on sustainable tourism practices. Zeitz is also vice-president of Fauna and Flora International.

=== Zeitz Museum of Contemporary Art Africa ===
The Zeitz Collection was founded in 2002. Since 2008 it has committed to becoming "one of the most representative collections of contemporary art from the African continent and its diaspora." The Zeitz Collection bought 85 works at the 2013 Venice Biennale, including the award-winning installation at the Angola pavilion by artist Edson Chagas, a series of photographs by Zanele Muholi from the South Africa pavilion, and three large sculptures by Michele Mathison in the Zimbabwe pavilion.

In partnership with the Victoria & Alfred Waterfront, Zeitz founded the Zeitz Museum of Contemporary Art Africa (Zeitz MOCAA), located in the historic grain silo in Cape Town's Victoria & Alfred Waterfront. The museum features 9,500 square meters (102,000 square feet) of space over nine floors, including 6,000 square meters (65,000 square feet) for displays.

In 2014, Thomas Heatherwick was chosen to design the conversion of the 1920s granary into a museum, including 80 galleries, 18 education rooms, a rooftop sculpture garden as well as storage and conservation areas, a restaurant, a coffee shop, and bookstores. The official public opening of the museum took place in September 2017. The opening ceremony was presided over by Archbishop Emeritus Desmond Tutu. In the first year of opening the Zeitz MOCAA was visited by over 300,000 people and named one of the best museums in the world by the Time Magazine.

== Writing and film ==
In 2010, Zeitz co-wrote and published Prayer, Profit and Principles – Monk and Manager in dialogue with Anselm Grün, a Benedictine monk. The book has been translated into 15 languages and covers topics such as sustainability, the economy and prosperity, culture, values, success and responsibility.

In 2014 Zeitz co-wrote and published The Breakthrough Challenge: 10 Ways to Connect Today's Profits with Tomorrow's Bottom Line with John Elkington.

In 2021, Zeitz served as executive producer of the film Breaking Boundaries. This documentary film, narrated by Sir David Attenborough, breaks down the climate thresholds needed for the survival of the planet and humanity. The ten-minute trailer was screened to world leaders at the Biden Climate Summit in April 2021, and was released globally on Netflix in June 2021.

Zeitz also served as producer on the award-winning documentary film 'Ranger'. Set within Kenya's Maasai homeland, the documentary 'Ranger' follows the formation of East Africa's first all-female anti-poaching unit. Upending the male-dominated world of military-style ranger training, these women instead undergo an extensive program of deep trauma release and healing, triggering profound transformation within themselves and sending shockwaves through their communities. The acclaimed film was accepted into 14 Film Festivals and won Best Documentary Feature at the 2023 Sedona International Film Festival.

== Honours and awards ==
Zeitz has received the "Strategist of the Year" honours three times from the Financial Times, "Entrepreneur of the Year", "Trendsetter of the Year" and "Best of European Business Award 2006″. In 2004, he was awarded the Federal Cross of Merit of Germany. In 2009, he was named Honorary Warden of Kenya by the Kenya Wildlife Service. In 2010, the German Sustainability Foundation gave Zeitz an award for Germany's most sustainable future strategies. He was named a Conde Nast Traveler "Visionaries 2012" and one of Fast Company's "10 Most Important Players at the Rio +20 Conference". He received the 2012 German Image Award, the 2013 Banksia International Award and the Visionary Award for the 2013 Travel + Leisure Global Vision Award. In 2015 he was awarded the Special Advocacy Award for Responsible Capitalism.> The award ceremony was held at Lancaster House in London, and presented by Sajid Javid, Secretary of State for Business, Innovation and Skills. In the same year, he was ranked #18 of "The World's Top 100 Compassionate Business Leaders" by Salt Magazine and awarded for his advocacy of Responsible Capitalism by FIRST Magazine. In 2016, the Zoological Society of London honoured Zeitz as a ZSL Conservation Fellow. In 2017, Zeitz was named #26 in OOOM's "The World's Most Inspiring People" list. In 2019, Conde Nast Traveler named Zeitz as one of "The 44 People Changing the Way We Travel". In 2023, Zeitz was awarded the David Rockefeller Bridging Leadership award, recognising his ability to build trust across divides, a collaborative and inclusive approach to solving local, national and global challenges.
