= Apinan Poshyananda =

Apinan Poshyananda (Thai: อภินันท์ โปษยานนท์, RTGS: Aphinan Potsayanon; born 1956). He is one of the most renowned curators and art writers in the Asian region.

== Biography ==
=== Education ===
Poshyananda received an MFA degree from the University of Edinburgh, and a PhD in Art History from Cornell University.

=== Career ===
As artist, he received three medals in painting, printmaking and sculpture at the National Exhibition of Art and held solo exhibitions at Bhirasri Institute of Modern Art, National Art Gallery, Bangkok and Herbert Johnson Museum, Cornell University. As professor, he taught art and history of art at the Faculty of Fine and Applied Arts, Chulalongkorn University. As director of Art Centre, Chulalongkorn University, he initiated visiting artist program with Choi Jeong Hwa, Nobuyoshi Araki, Yasumasa Morimura, Hung Liu, Marina Abramović, Paolo Canevari, Mella Jaarsma, and curated exhibitions of Robert Mapplethorpe, Nan Goldin, Joel Peter-Witkin, Andres Serrano, Zhang Peili, Qiu Zhijie and emerging Thai artists.

Poshyananda was Director-General, the Office of Contemporary Art and Culture, Director-General, the Cultural Promotion Department and Permanent Secretary, Ministry of Culture, Thailand. He initiated the Silpathorn Art Award and Art fund for Thai artists. He commissioned the Thai Pavilion at the Venice Biennale (2003, 2005, 2007) and curated international exhibitions, including Asia-Pacific Triennial, Brisbane (Thai section, 1993, and Australian section, 1996), Johannesburg Biennale (Thai section, 1995), Istanbul Bienial (Thai section, 1995), Contemporary Art in Asia: Traditions/Tensions in New York, Vancouver, Perth, and Taipei (1996-1998), Asian Section at the São Paulo Art Biennial (1998); guest curator, Heri Dono, Japan Foundation, Tokyo (2000); EV+A, Limerick (2001); Floating Chimera, Sollentuna (2001); Beyond Paradise, Bangkok, Kuala Lumpur, Shanghai (2002); Temple of the Mind: Montien Boonma, New York, San Francisco, Canberra, Bangkok (2001-2003), Art on the Beach (2005, Phuket), Traces of Siamese Smile (2008), Show Me Thai (MOT, 2009), Bangkok Bananas (2010), Thai Transience, Singapore Art Museum (2013), Thailand Eye, Saatchi Gallery, London (2015), Bangkok Art Biennale (2018, 2020, 2022, 2024, 2026), The Spirits of Maritime Crossing at Venice Biennale (2024).

Author of Modern Art in Thailand (1992), Western-style Painting and Sculpture in Royal Thai Court (1993).

== Contribution to contemporary art ==
According to the cited source, Poshyananda has promoted Thai contemporary artists by supporting their participation in international exhibitions. He has also worked as a curator for exhibitions in Thailand and abroad.

He served as a committee member of the Solomon R. Guggenheim Museum, National Gallery Singapore. He is advisor to Thai Beverage Plc, and member Art and Culture Committee at One Bangkok.

Honors include outstanding researcher, National Research Council of Thailand, Thailand’s Knight Grand Cordon, Sweden’s Order of the Polar Star, Italy’s Order of the Star of Solidarity, and France’s Order of Arts and Letters.

== Selected works ==
- Artistic Director, Bangkok Art Biennale (2018, 2020, 2022, 2024, 2026)
- Curator, The Spirits of Maritime Crossing at Venice Biennale (2024)
- Curator, Thailand Eye, Saatchi Gallery, London (2015)
- Curator, Thai Transience, Singapore Art Museum (2013)
- Curator, Bangkok Bananas (2010)
- Curator, Traces of Siamese Smile; Bangkok Art and Culture Centre, Bangkok (2008)
- Curator, Show Me Thai, Museum of Contemporary Art, Tokyo (2007)
- Commissioned the Thai Pavilion at the Venice Biennale (2003, 2005, 2007)
- Curator, Art on the Beach; Phuket (2005)
- Co-editor of Over Here (The New Museum of Contemporary Art, New York, 2004)
- Curator, Temple of the Mind: Montien Boonma; New York, San Francisco, Canberra, Bangkok (2001-2003)
- Curator, Beyond Paradise; Bangkok, Kuala Lumpur, Shanghai (2002)
- Curator, EV+A; Limerick (2001)
- Curator, Floating Chimera; Sollentuna, Stockholm (2001)
- Guest curator, Heri Dono, Japan Foundation; Tokyo (2000)
- One of the curators writing for Fresh Cream: Contemporary Art in Culture (Phaidon Press, 2000)
- International advisor for 1st Echigo-Tsumari Triennal (2000) and 1st Yokohama Triennal (2001)
- Curator, São Paulo Art Biennial (Asian Section, 1998)
- Curator, Contemporary Art in Asia: Traditions/Tensions; New York, Vancouver, Perth, and Taipei (1996-1998)
- Curator, Asia-Pacific Triennial; Brisbane (Thai section, 1993, and Australian section, 1996)
- Curator, Johannesburg Biennale (Thai section, 1995)
- Curator, Istanbul Biennial (Thai section, 1995)
- Author of Modern Art in Thailand (1992) and Western-style Painting and Sculpture in Royal Thai Court (1993)
