= Marija Teresė Rožanskaitė =

- Born: 18 March 1933; Linkuva
- Died: 6 September 2007 (aged 74); Vilnius
- Occupation: Painter
- Spouse(s): Igoris Piekuras
- Children: Gediminas Piekuras, Marijus Piekuras
- Awards: Knight of the Order of Vytautas the Great

Marija Teresė Rožanskaitė (18 March 1933 – 6 September 2007) was a Lithuanian painter and sculptor. Rožanskaitė's work focuses on institutionalized medicine, medical devices and procedures, health, and physical suffering.

Marija Teresė Rožanskaitė was born on 18 March 1933 in Linkuva. During the Soviet occupation of the Baltic states, her family was part of Stalin's mass deportations from the Baltic states in 1941. She and her mother escaped exile from the Altai region and returned to Lithuania in 1948. She studied at the Lithuanian Art Institute under Leonas Katinas, Vincas Dilka, Vladas Karatajus, and Antanas Gudaitis.

Her work was selected to represent Lithuania at the 60th Venice Biennale in 2024. Her paintings were featured in the exhibition Inflammation along with instillations by Pakui Hardware.

== Personal life ==
Marija Teresė Rožanskaitė married painter Igoris Piekuras. Their children are painter Marijus Piekuras and sculptor Gediminas Piekuras.
