= Hong Minsheng =

Hong Minsheng (born in January 1933, Chinese: 洪民生) is a native of Ningbo, Zhejiang Province. He is a television artist, senior editor and calligrapher of the People's Republic of China.

== Biography ==
Hong Minsheng joined the Chinese Communist Party in 1956. He graduated from the Department of Journalism of Renmin University of China in 1960 and stayed on as a teacher. He joined China Central Television in 1962 and became its deputy director from 1980. He was concurrently the editor-in-chief in 1988, vice-president and secretary-general of the China Television Artists Association in 1993, and a member of the Chinese Calligraphers' Association
