= Liu Youju =

Chinese artist and critic

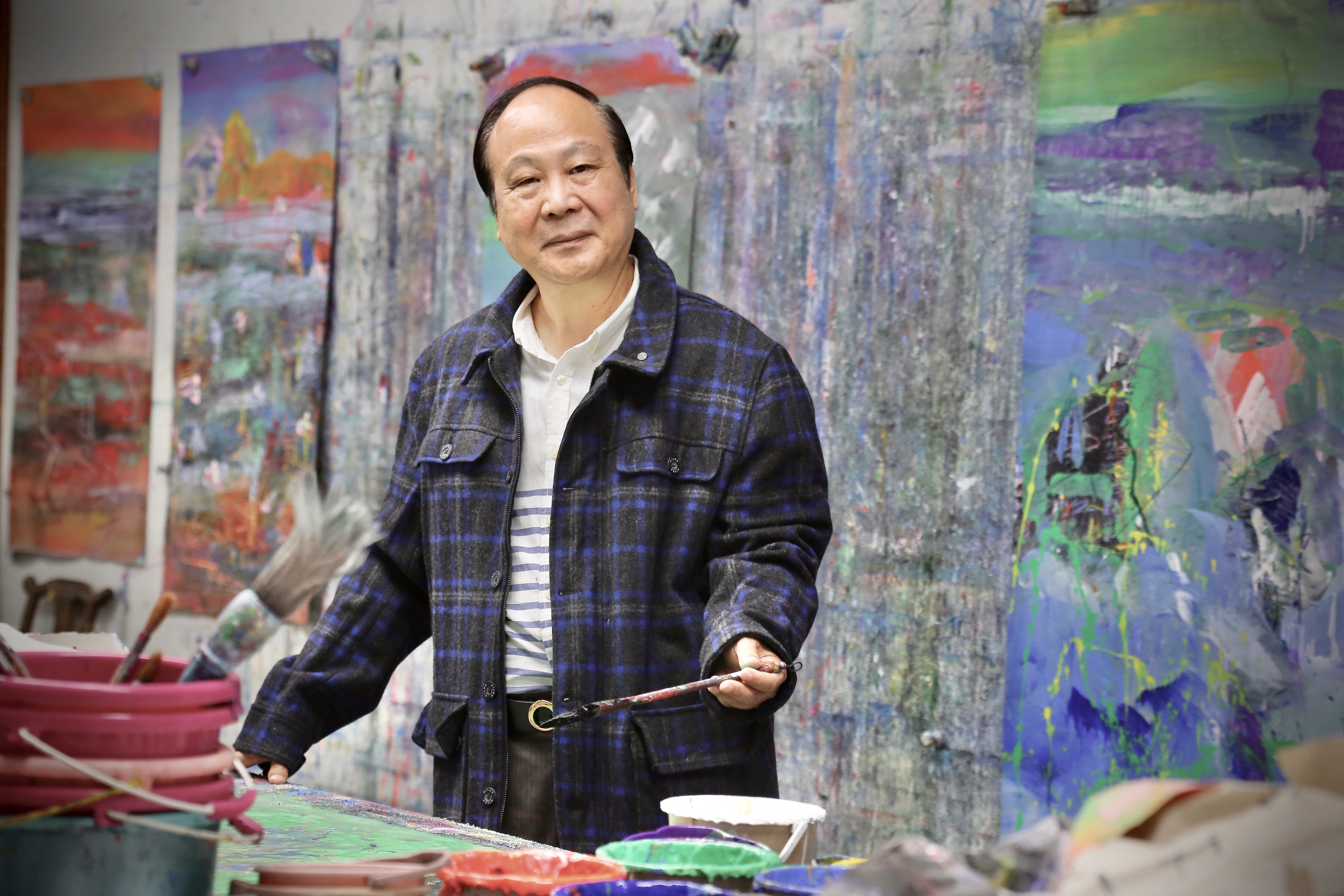

Liu Youju (born in 1955, Jiexi, Guangdong, China) is a contemporary Chinese art critic, calligrapher, avant-garde artist, and practitioner of “illusionist painting”. In his early years, he was involved in poetry, prose, and literary criticism, with some of his poems included in the Selection of Contemporary Poems by A Thousand Authors ("當代千家詩選粹").

After leaving the Chinese Calligrapher’s Association in 2011, he founded illusionist painting, a style that later brought his artworks to major international institutions, including the Nixon Presidential Museum in the U.S., the British Museum, the Louvre Museum in France, and the art gallery of the Academy of Fine Arts of Florence in Italy. In 2016, he organized a personal workshop featuring his artworks at the Academy of Fine Arts of Florence, and in 2017 he held a solo exhibition at the Centre Georges-Pompidou, where he also delivered a lecture during an art research seminar.

Liu’s international recognition continued to grow. In 2019, he became the first Chinese artist to receive the Michelangelo Prize in the field of painting, and in 2021 he was inaugurated as an honorary fellow of the Italian Academy of Art in Florence. His work Mars Program was selected for the 60th Venice Biennale in April 2024 and exhibited at Palazzo Dona dalle Rose, the official venue of the Biennale. From July 15 to August 15 of the same year, he returned to the venue for his solo exhibition Starting From The Metapoint.

In 2025, Liu Youju presented another solo exhibition, Bounded and Unbounded, along with a solo works symposium at the Galleria Nazionale d'Arte Moderna e Contemporanea in Rome, Italy.

== Exhibitions ==
- 2014, the Richard Nixon Museum, Yorba Linda, California, United States.
- March 2015, Liu Youju's personal exhibition, Beijing's Today Art Museum.
- August 2015, "Rational Return of Illusionism" – Liu Youju Art Exhibition, the Maréchal Hall of the Louvre Decorative Art Museum.
- June 2016，“Demolition VS Construction”– Liu Youju Painting Exhibition，organized by the Academy of the Arts of Drawing in Florence.
- September 2021，“Beyond Abstraction” – Liu Youju Painting Exhibition，organized by the Academy of the Arts of Drawing in Florence.
- 20 April to 24 November 2024, the 60th Venice Biennale (La Biennale di Venezia), Liu Youju's work "Mars Project" was exhibited at the Palazzo Donà dalle Rose in Venice, the official exhibition hall of the Venice Biennale.
- From April 20 to November 24, 2024, Liu Youju's work “Mars Project” was for the 60th Venice Biennale and was exhibited at Palazzo Dona dalle Rose, the official pavilion of the Venice Biennale.
- From July 2024 to August, 2024, Liu Youju's solo painting exhibition "Starting from the Yuan Point" was held at Palazzo Dona dalle Rose, the official exhibition hall of the Venice Biennale, Italy.
- From October 17th to November 23rd ,2025, the solo painting exhibition of Liu Youju titled "Bounded and Unbounded" was held at the Galleria Nazionale d’Arte Moderna e Contemporanea in Rome, Italy.
- On October 22nd ,2025, the solo painting exhibition of Liu Youju titled "Bounded and Unbounded" and the "Liu Youju Solo Works Seminar" were held in the Aldrovandi Rooms on the second floor of the Galleria Nazionale d’Arte Moderna e Contemporanea in Rome, Italy.

== Auction ==
In 2017, several of Liu Youju's works were sold at Poly International Auction. "The Breath of Spring" was sold for 690,000 RMB, "Scale Wave Mirage" was sold for 345,000 RMB, "Uncultivated Land" was sold for 862,500 RMB, "Water Town" was sold for 149,500 RMB, and "Nymph in the Flowers" was sold for 230,000 RMB. In the same year, an untitled work by Liu was sold at Poly International Auction Co. for 22,515 USD.
