= Tong Wei (artist) =

Chinese calligrapher

Tong Wei (September 1929 - July 12, 2017, Chinese: 佟韦), formerly known as Tong Yupeng (Chinese: 佟遇鹏), was a Chinese artist. He was a native of Changtu County, Liaoning Province.

== Biography ==
In 1949, he graduated from the North China People's Revolutionary University (Chinese: 北京华北人民革命大学) in Beijing. From July 1949, worked for a long time in the China Federation of Literary and Art Circles and the Ministry of Culture, serving as deputy director of the office of the China Federation of Literary and Art Circles and director of the Department of Organization and Association. In 1981, responsible for the founding of the Chinese Calligraphers' Association (Chinese: 中国书法家协会), served as secretary-general of the first Congress of Calligraphers, and successively served as secretary-general of the Chinese Calligraphers' Association, and vice-chairman of the Chinese Calligraphers' Association. In July 2017 Died in Beijing on July 12, 2017, at the age of 88.
