= Iva Lulashi =

- Born: 1988; Tirana
- Occupation: Artist

Iva Lulashi (born 1988) is an Albanian painter who works in Milan.

Iva Lulashi was born on 1988 in Tirana, Albania. She graduated from the Academy of Fine Arts in Venice in 2016.

She paired with Guatemalan artist Regina José Galindo for shows that explored violence against women: Nearby Elsewhere at the Prometeo Gallery in Milan in 2020 and Mujer, Mujer, Mujer at the Alberta Pane Gallery in Paris in 2024.

Lulashi was selected to represent Albania at the 60th Venice Biennial. Her exhibition, Love as a Glass of Water, invokes the glass of water theory of Russian feminist Alexandra Kollontai.
