= Mounira Al Solh =

Lebanese-Dutch visual artist

- Born: 1978
- Education: Rijksakademie van beeldende kunsten
- Occupation: Painter, drawer, video artist, video installation artist, performance artist, embroiderer, artist
- Website: www.mouniraalsolh.com

Mounira Al Solh, also known as Mounira al-Solh (born 1978 in Beirut) is a Lebanese-Dutch visual artist.

== Life and education ==
Mounira Al Solh was born to Lebanese father and a Syrian mother. In 1989, during the Lebanese Civil War, her family left Beirut and emigrated to Damascus in Syria. Al Solh studied painting at the Lebanese University in Beirut (1998 until 2001) and Fine Arts at the Gerrit Rietveld Academie in Amsterdam (2003–2006), and was a resident at the Rijksakademie van beeldende kunsten in Amsterdam (2007–2008).

She lives and works in Beirut and Amsterdam.

== Work ==
Al Solh creates artworks on paper, performances, embroidery and film works about the topics of trauma, loss, migration and memory, inspired by the ongoing conflict situation in the Middle East. She treats these topics in a fictional, not documentary way.

In 2008, Al Solh started NOA Magazine (Not Only Arabic). She co-founded NOA Language School in Amsterdam in 2013.

She had solo exhibitions at (among others) BALTIC Centre for Contemporary Art (2022), Art Institute of Chicago (2018), and Centre for Contemporary Art, Glasgow (2013). She participated in documenta 14 (Athens and Kassel, 2017) and the 56th Venice Biennale (2015).

In 2024, Mounira al Solh was selected to represent Lebanon in the 60th Venice Biennale.

== Awards ==
She is the winner of the ABN AMRO Art Award (2023), is one of seven shortlisted artists for the Artes Mundi 10 prize (2023); received the Uriôt Prize from the Rijksakademie, Amsterdam (2007) and the Black Magic Woman Award, Amsterdam (2007). She was also shortlisted for the Abraaj Group Art Prize., Dubai (2015) and nominated for the Volkskrant Beeldende Kunst Prijs, Amsterdam (2009). Her video Rawane’s Song won the jury prize at Videobrasil (2007).

== Exhibitions ==
- 2025: A land as big as her skin, Bonnefantenmuseum, Maastricht, Netherlands
- 2024: Lebanese Pavillon, La Biennale Di Venezia 2024
- 2024: Unravel: The Power and Politics of Textiles in Art, Barbican Art Gallery, London, United Kingdom
- 2024: Unravel: The Power and Politics of Textiles in Art, Stedelijk Museum, Amsterdam, Netherlands
- 2023: Pocket Rhythms, Sfeir-Semler Gallery, Hamburg
- 2023: Dream City Festival, Tunis, Tunisia
- 2023: Artes Mundi 10, National Museum Cardiff, Cardiff, United Kingdom
- 2023: Choreographies of the Impossible | 35th Bienal De São Paulo, São Paulo, Brazil
- 2023: My past is a foreign country, DEO Projects, Temenos Hamidiye & Ottoman Baths, Chios, Greece
- 2023: Material Power: Palestinian Embroidery, The Whitworth, University of Manchester, Manchester, United Kingdom
- 2022: 13 April, 13 April, 13 April, Museumsquartier Osnabrück, Germany
- 2022: A day is as long as a year, BALTIC Centre for Contemporary Art, Gateshead, United Kingdom
- 2020: MAM Screen 013: Mounira Al Solh, Mori Art Museum, Tokyo, Japan
- 2019: The Mother of David and Goliath, Sfeir-Semler Gallery, Beirut, Lebanon
- 2018: Artist’s Rooms: Mounira Al Solh, Jameel Arts Center, Dubai, UAE
- 2018: I strongly believe in our right to be frivolous, Mathaf: Arab Museum of Modern Art, Doha, Qatar
- 2018: I strongly believe in our right to be frivolous, The Art Institute Chicago
- 2016: I Want to Be a Party, Sfeir-Semler Gallery Hamburg, Germany
- 2016: I Strongly Believe in Our Right to Be Frivolous, Alt Art Space, Istanbul, Turkey
- 2014: All Mother Tongues are Difficult, Sfeir-Semler Karantina, Beirut, Lebanon
