= Wang Xiaosong =

Artist, curator and professor

Professor Wang Xiaosong
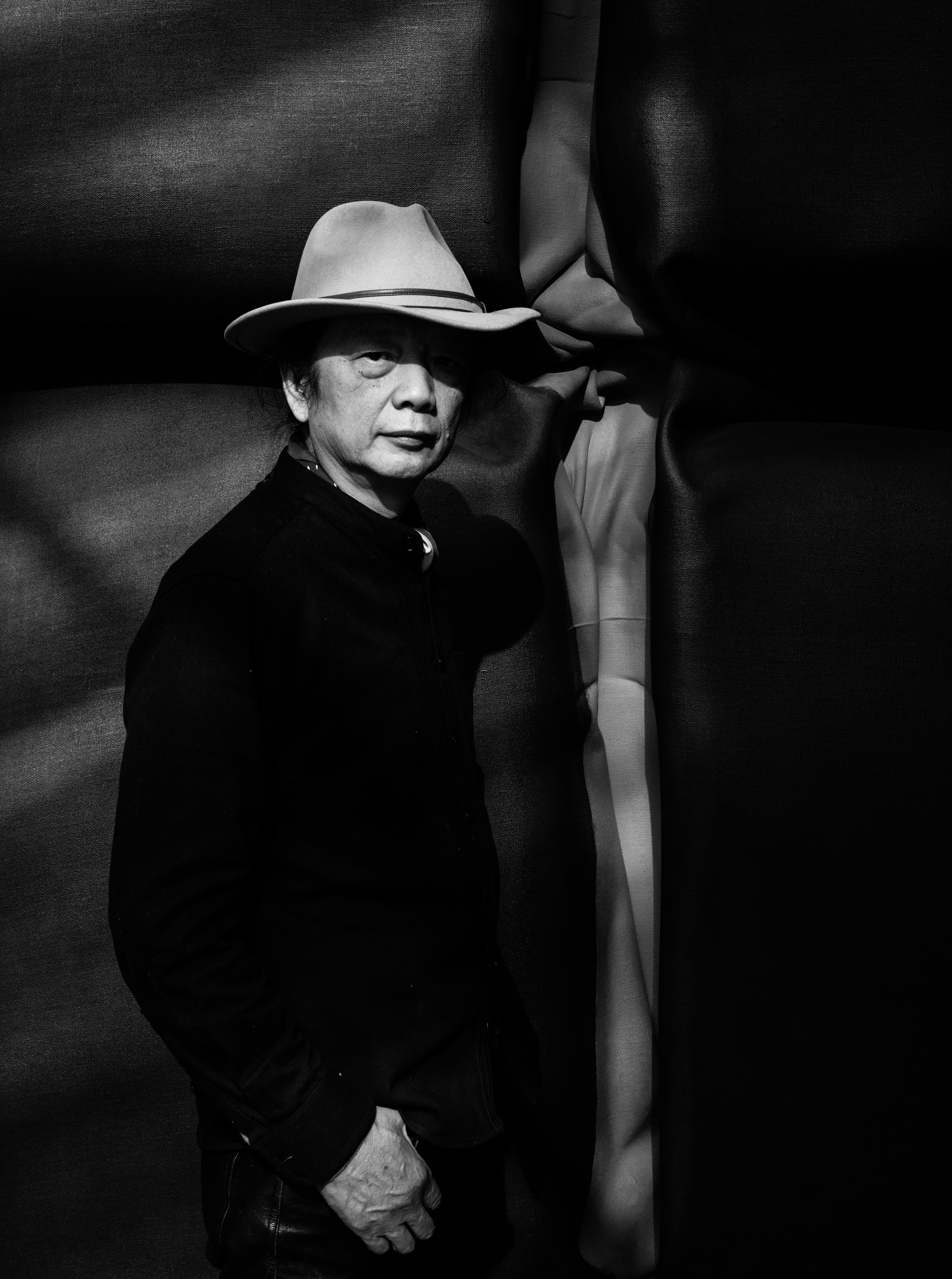
- Born: Wuhan
- Education: Academy of Arts and Design, Tsinghua University; Berlin University of the Arts
- Notable work: Making Life, Biennale dell'Arte, Venice
- Website: http://wangxiaosong.com/

Wang Xiaosong (Chinese: 王小松) is a Chinese artist, curator, and academic. He is a Professor and Doctoral Advisor at the School of Art and Archaeology, Zhejiang University, where he served as Vice Dean from 2019 to 2025.

Regarded as the pioneer of Multi-dimensional Painting, Wang is noted for synthesizing Western and Chinese artistic concepts, drawing from his education at the Berlin University of the Arts and Tsinghua University.

His major curatorial contributions include the China Pavilion at the 60th Venice Biennale, Atlas: Harmony in Diversity (2024) and the national cultural project A Comprehensive Collection of Ancient Chinese Paintings.

== Current positions and service ==
In addition to his academic role, Wang holds several leadership positions:

- Member, National Steering Committee for Professional Master’s Degree Education in Design, Ministry of Education, P.R. China;
- Member, National Steering Committee for Art Major Examinations and Admissions in Higher Education Institutions, Ministry of Education, P.R. China;
- Deputy Director, Laboratory of Art And Archaeology Image, Zhejiang University, (Philosophy and Social Sciences Laboratory of the Ministry of Education);
- Member, Academic Degree Committee, Faculty of Informatics, Zhejiang University;
- Member, Academic Committee, Faculty of Humanities, Zhejiang University;
- Director, Institute of Contemporary Art and Design, Zhejiang University.

== Early life and education ==
Wang was born in Wuhan, Hubei in 1964. After the beginning of the Cultural Revolution in 1966, his father was involved, while Wang returned to his hometown in Dalian, Liaoning in 1969.

Since childhood, Wang was fond of creating clay figures. His grandfather and grandmother were a craftsman and a housewife, respectively. His mother was a singer in Wuhan. One of his uncles played the piano, another played the flute, and his aunt was a dancer. Wang noted in an interview that his "living environment was full of the arts".

Wang began to learn drawing and calligraphy as a teenager. He attended Wuhan Experimental School, where he "practiced sketching and colors". In 1983, he began his studies at the Central Academy of Arts & Design in Beijing—now known as the Academy of Arts and Design at Tsinghua University. Under the supervision of professors Liu Jude and Yu Binnan, Wang majored in Book Decoration, graduating in 1987.

In 1990, he moved to Berlin, where he majored in Visual Communication at the Berlin University of the Arts with professors Spohn and Bernhard Boës.

== Career ==
In 1992, Wang settled in Berlin, working as a freelance artist and designer. In 1994, Wang was accepted as a member of the German Artists Society (Association of German Artists).

In 1996, he became a Director and Cultural General Supervisor at the Germany-China Cultural Exchanges Association. From 1997 to 2003, he taught at Victor Gollancz Volkshochschule Steglitz in Berlin. In 2003, he moved back to China and has since served as a doctoral advisor, professor, and dean of the Visual Communication Design Department in the Academy of Fine Arts at Zhejiang University.

In addition to his activities as an artist and lecturer, Wang, in cooperation with Berlin architect Peter Ruge, maintains an architectural office in Hangzhou, where numerous new buildings and urban designs are conceived, organized, and realized.

In 2011, Wang's work, Making Life, was shown at the Venice Biennale. Making Life was conceived as an antithesis to the official Chinese pavilion. Wang's works are part of various notable collections, such as the National Art Museum of China, the Ludwig Museum Koblenz, and the Wiener Künstlerhaus. Wang is represented in Europe exclusively by the Schütz Fine Art gallery in Vienna.

In 2012, Wang held his solo exhibition, Out-of-Control Ants — Wang Xiaosong Solo Exhibition (失控的蚂蚁) at the Ludwig Museum in Koblenz and the St. Annen Museum in Lübeck, Germany.

Since 2018, Wang has served as the Chief Curator for the exhibition series of the major national cultural project, A Comprehensive Collection of Ancient Chinese Paintings. The exhibition has toured numerous prominent venues, including the National Museum of China, Zhejiang Exhibition Hall, China National Archives of Publications and Culture (Hangzhou Branch), Zhejiang Art Museum, Hebei Museum, Jiaxing Art Museum, Ningbo Museum of Art, the University of Macau Museum of Art, Sichuan Fine Arts Institute, and the Shanghai Songjiang Yunjian Hall Cultural and Art Center. Notably, the exhibition at the National Museum of China attracted over 4 million visitors, setting a historical record for temporary exhibitions at the museum.

In 2024, Wang co-curated the China Pavilion at the 60th International Art Exhibition of La Biennale di Venezia alongside independent curator Jiang Jun. The exhibition, themed Atlas: Harmony in Diversity, was recognized by Forbes as one of the "8 must-see pavilions" at the Biennale.

== Work ==
=== Style ===
Wang is an abstractionist. His style has been described as "breaking the boundary between painting and sculpture".

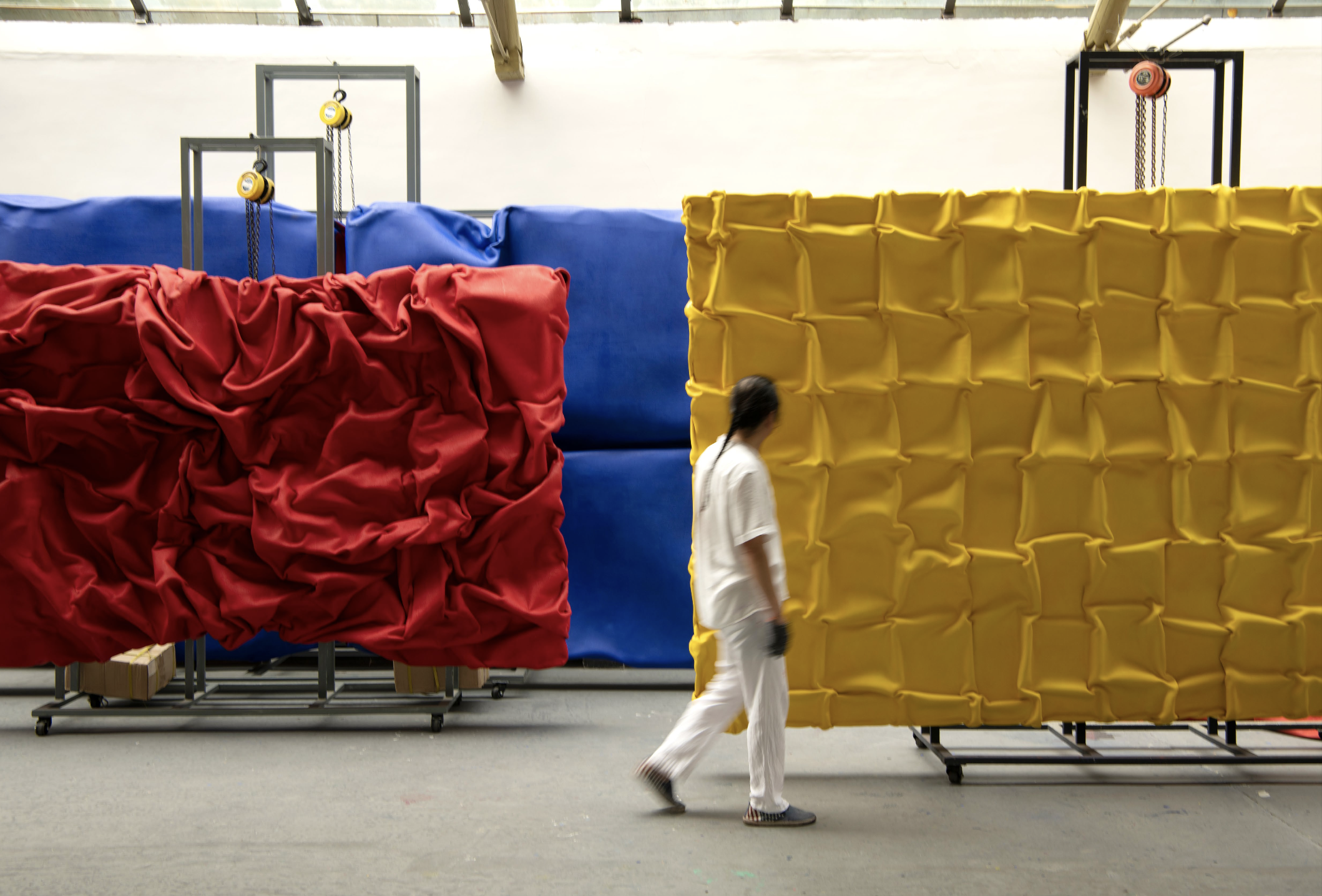
Wang Xiaosong in his studio

=== Themes ===
Wang's early work occupies an ambivalent middle ground between the abstract (textures, shapes, and patterns) and the figurative (wounds and anthropomorphic figures on the surface). In some of his works, such as Offenes China, cuts similar to those used by Lucio Fontana break the unity of the canvas, giving it a three-dimensional dynamic.

The concepts of generation and decease are central in Wang's oeuvre, which becomes political when it addresses overpopulation, mass control, and uniformity.

In Wang's later works, such as Ohne Titel (blau), these themes remain at the center of his oeuvre. However, for the artist, there is no more need to rely on representative symbols of birth and annihilation, such as cuts and people.

=== Selected artworks ===
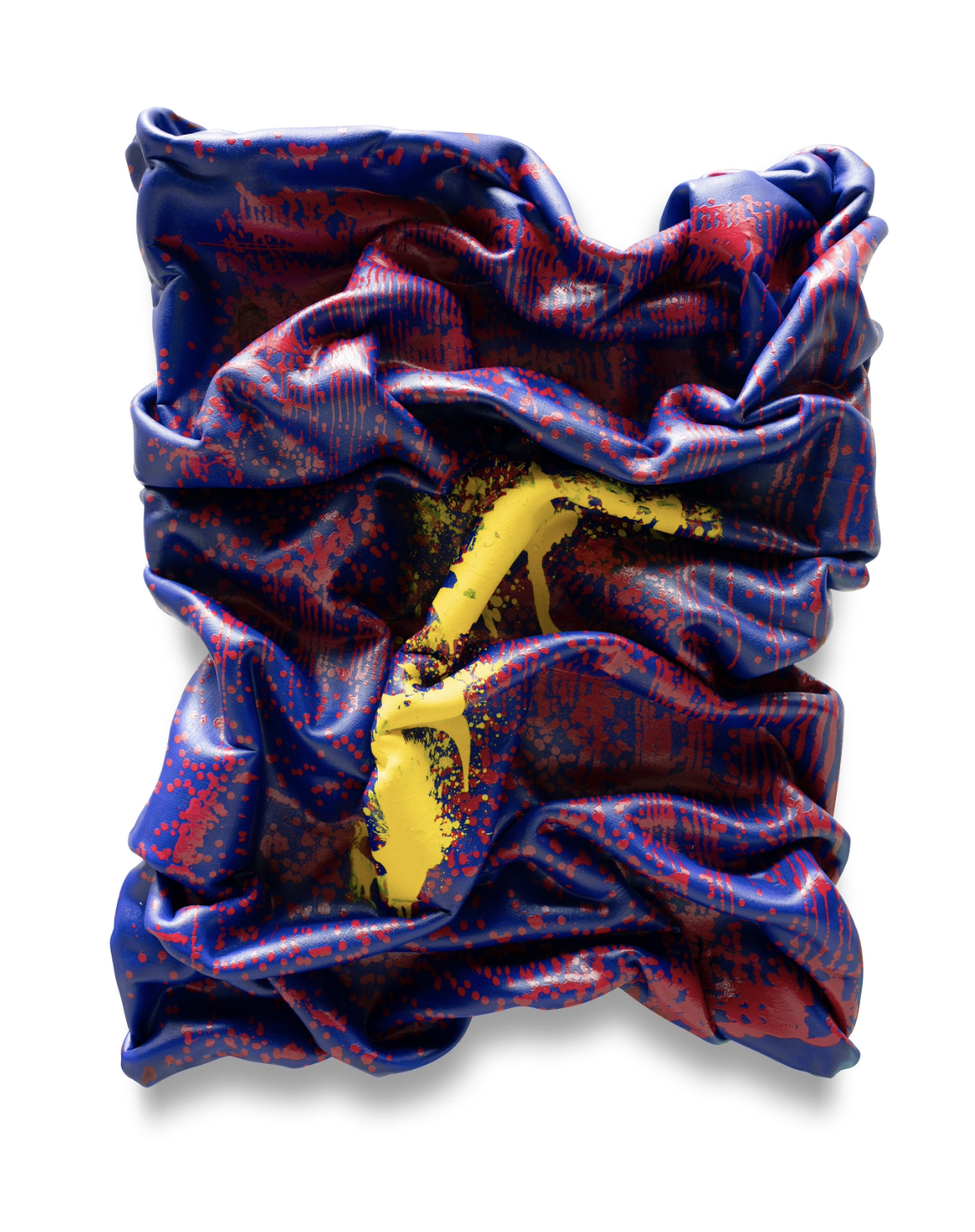
Cryptic Domain, 2025

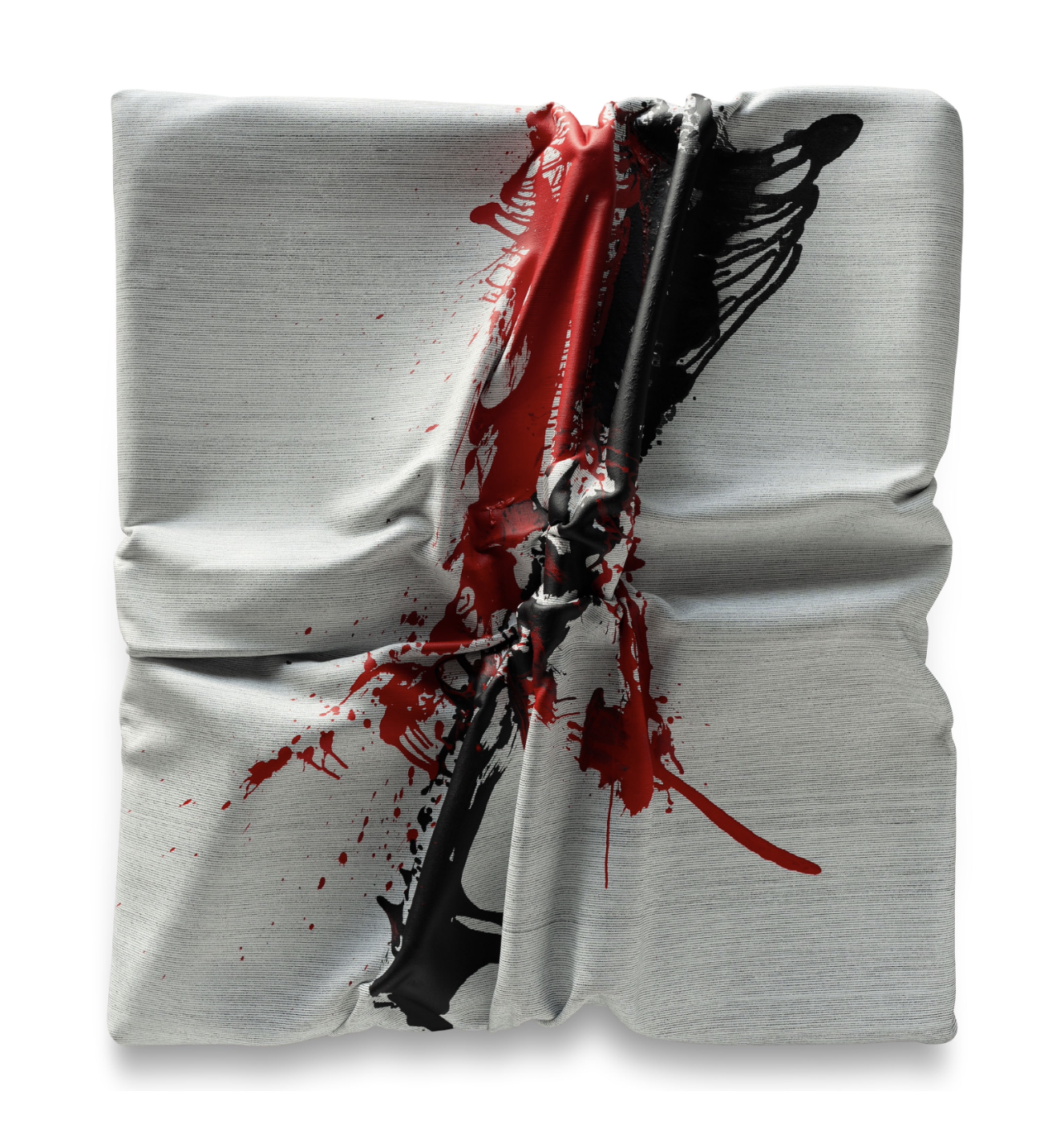
Eternal Moment, 2025

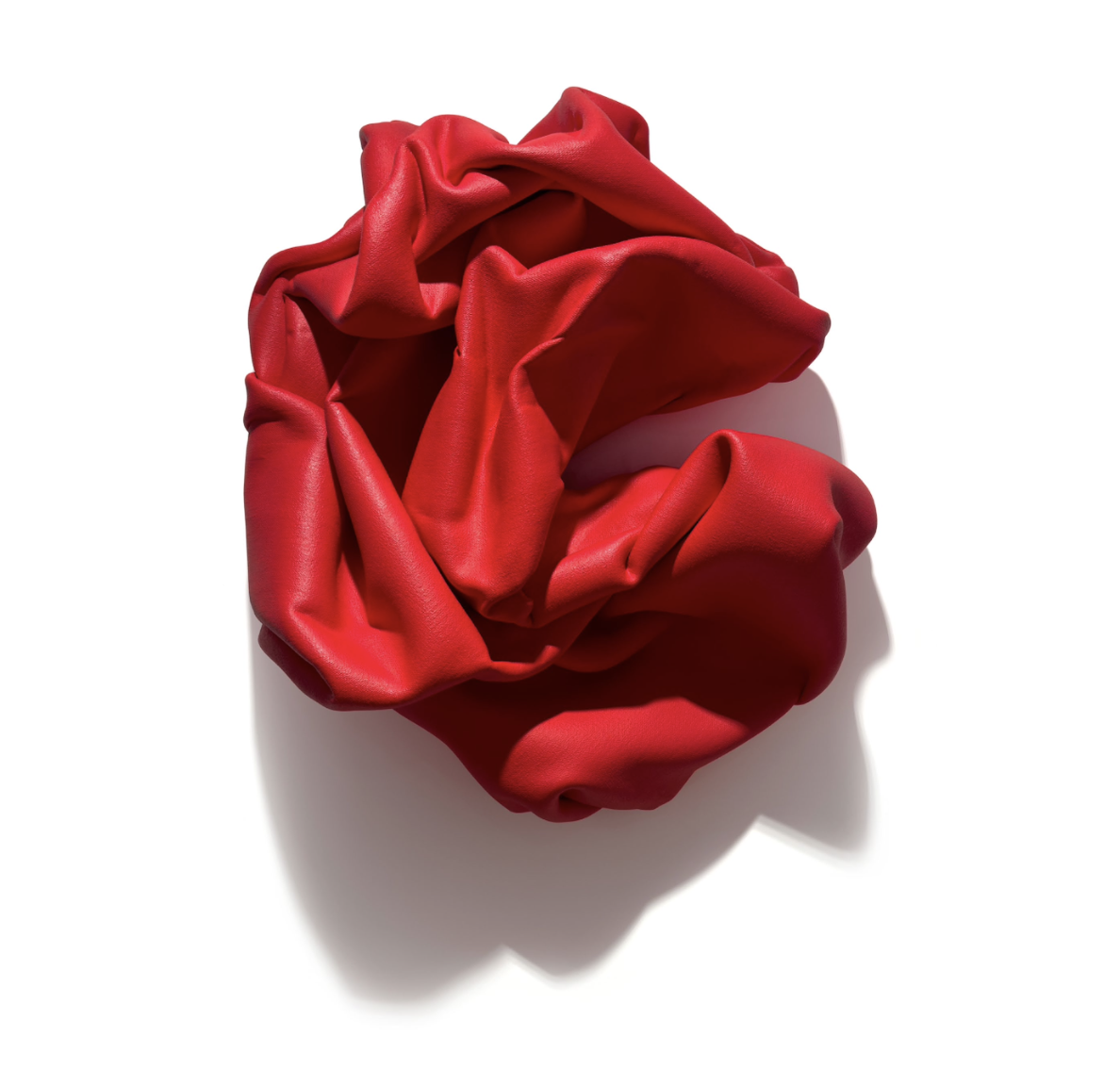
Near Zero, 2025

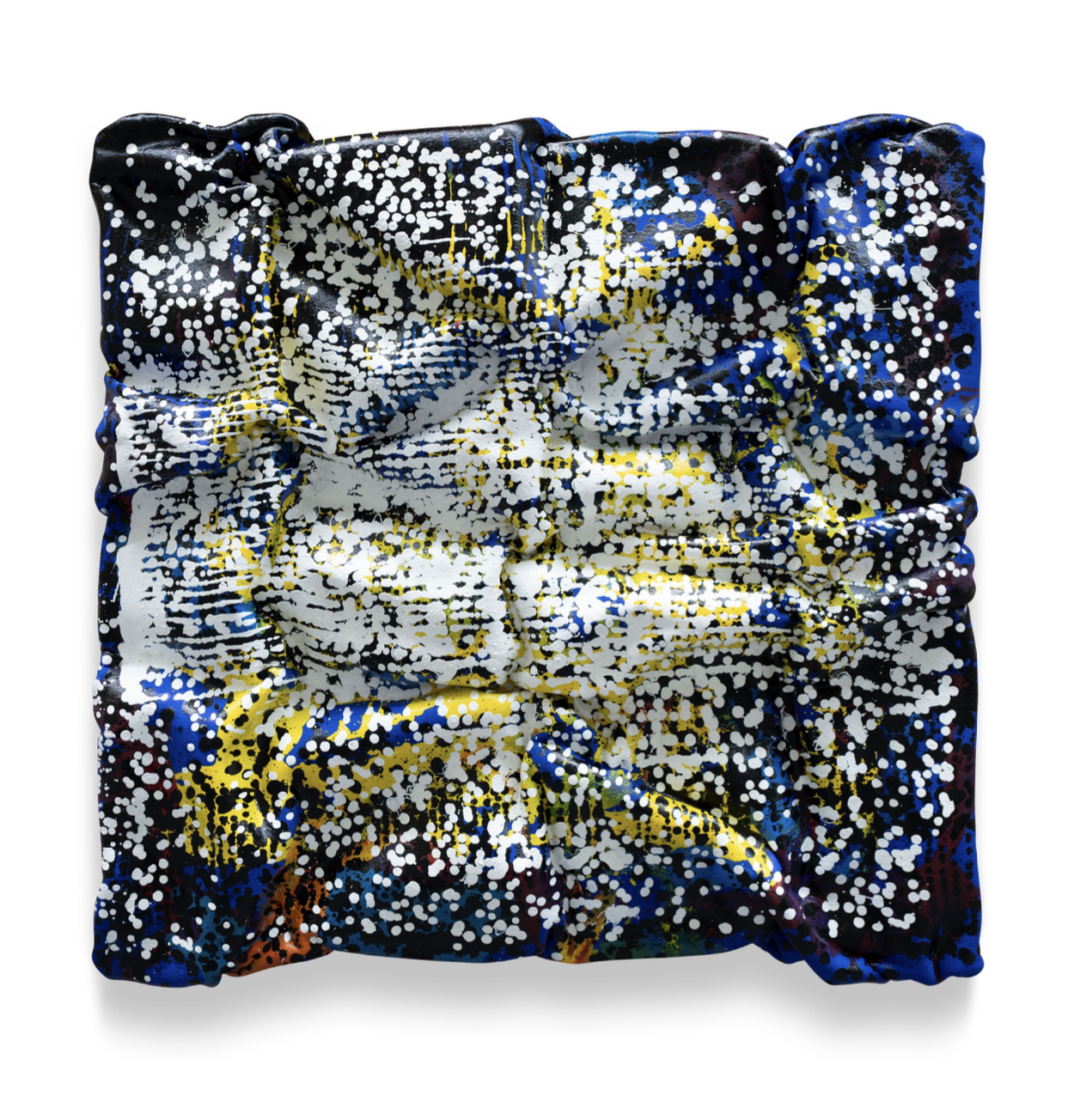
Loom of Illusion, 2025

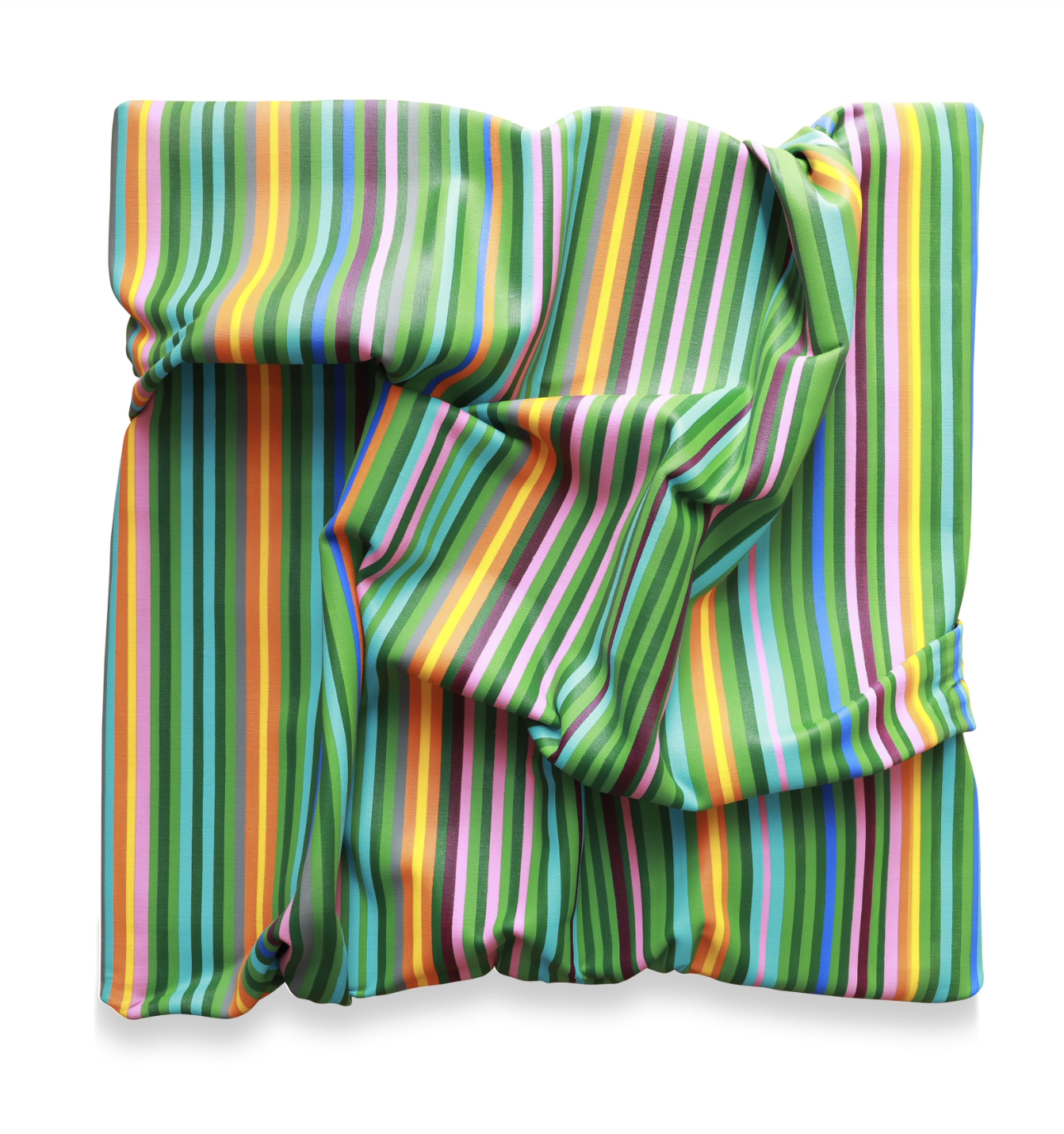
Crossing the Beach, 2022

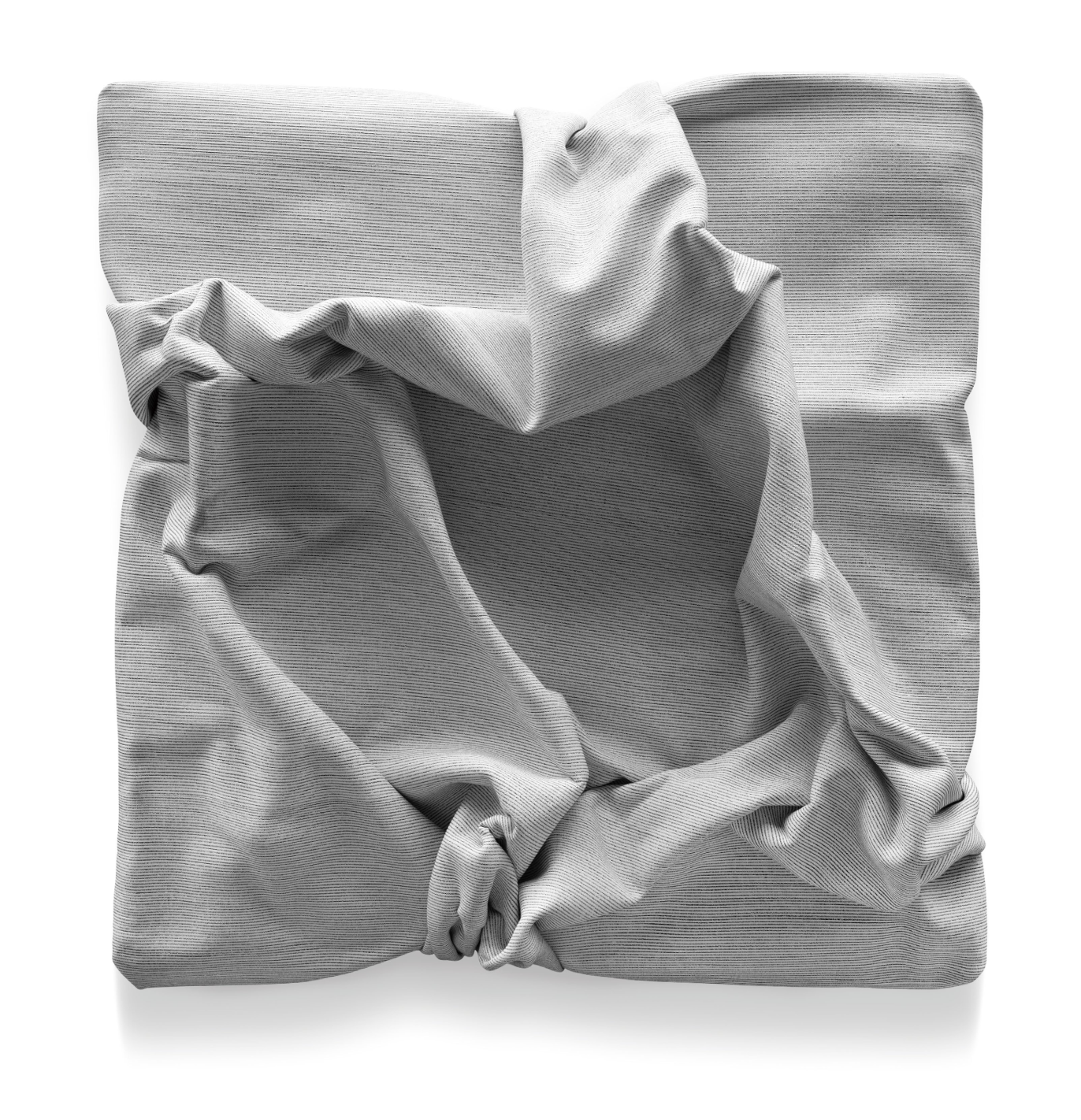
Jealous, 2022

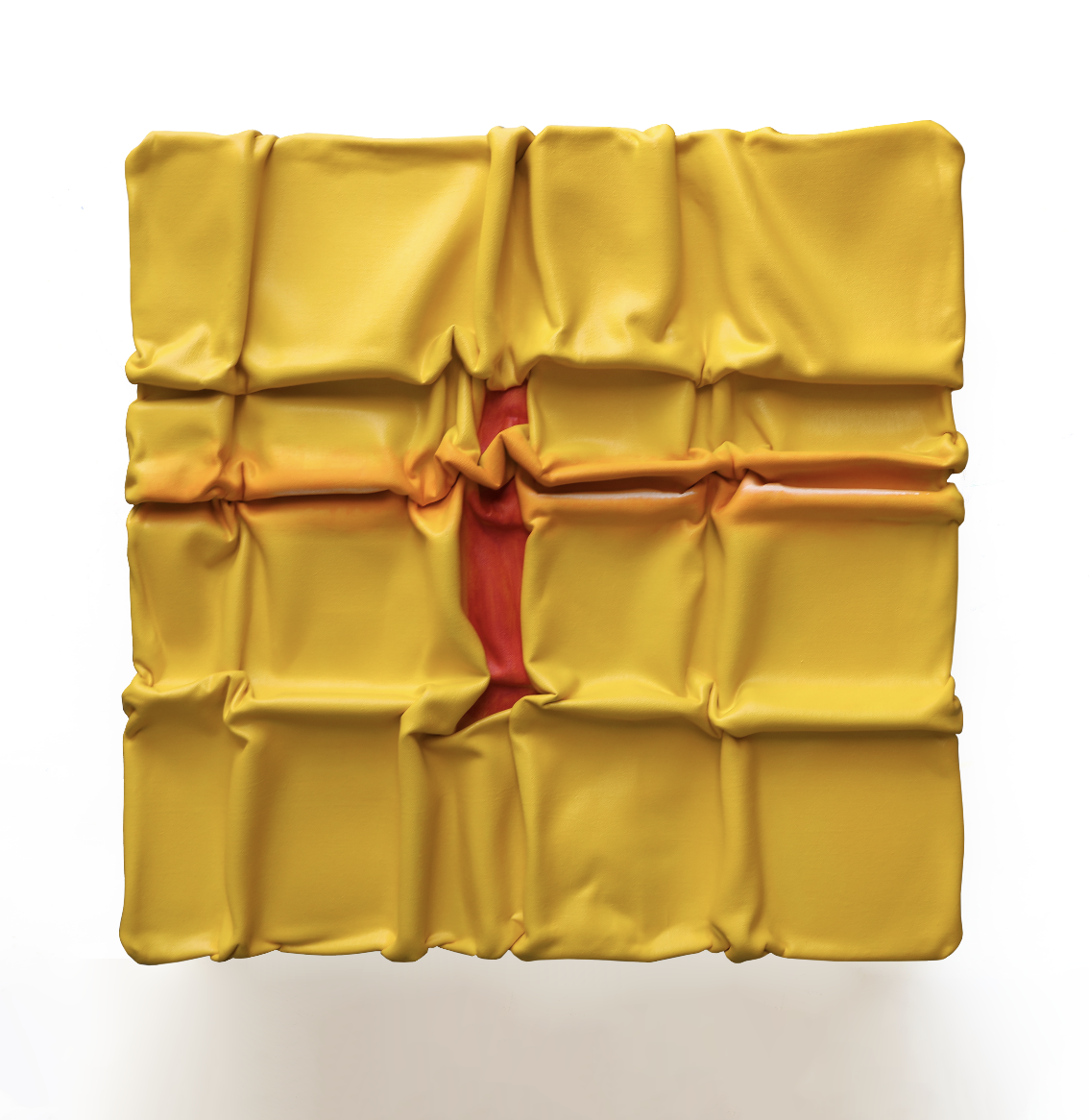
Hypocritical Innocence, 2020

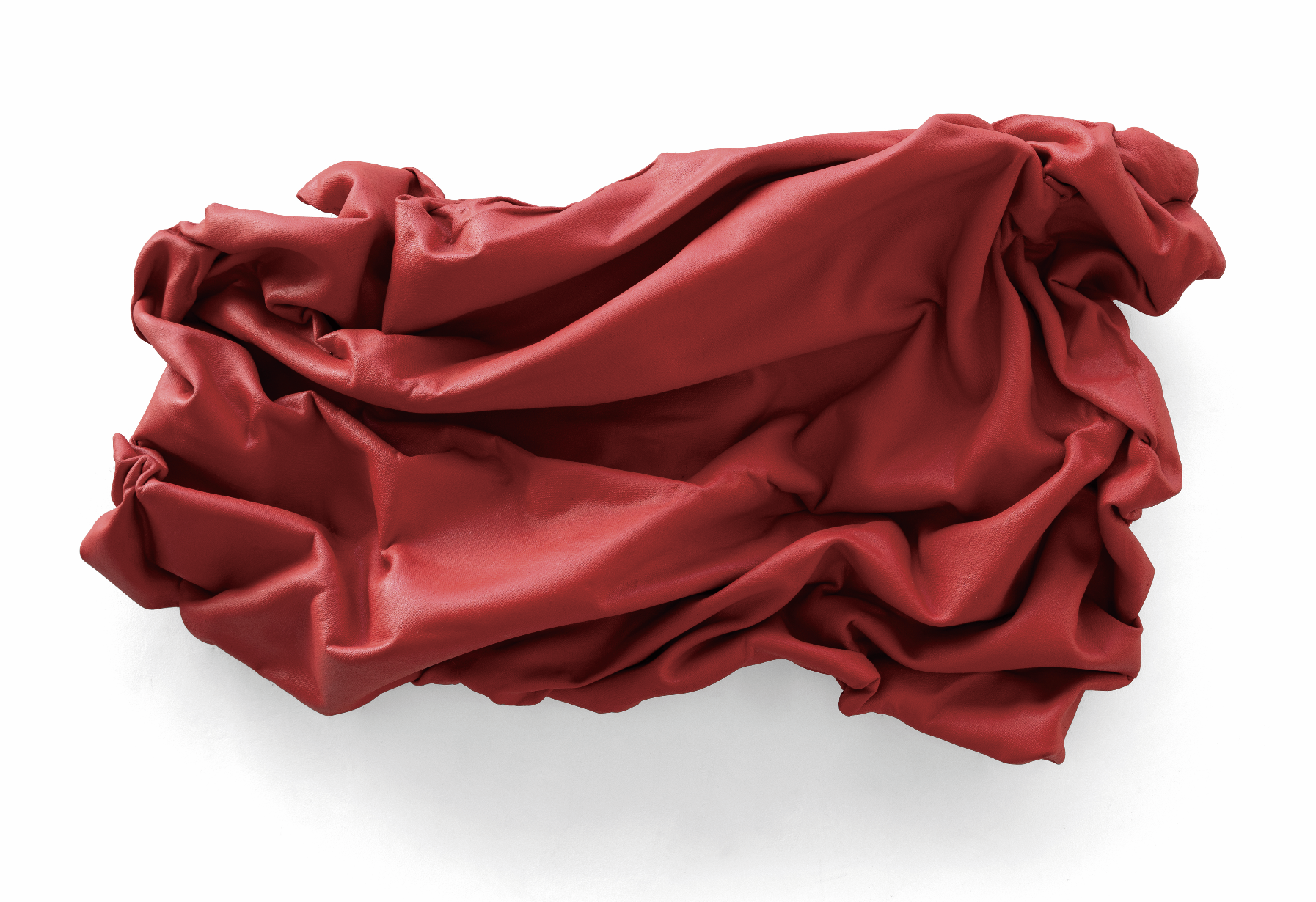
Plato, 2016

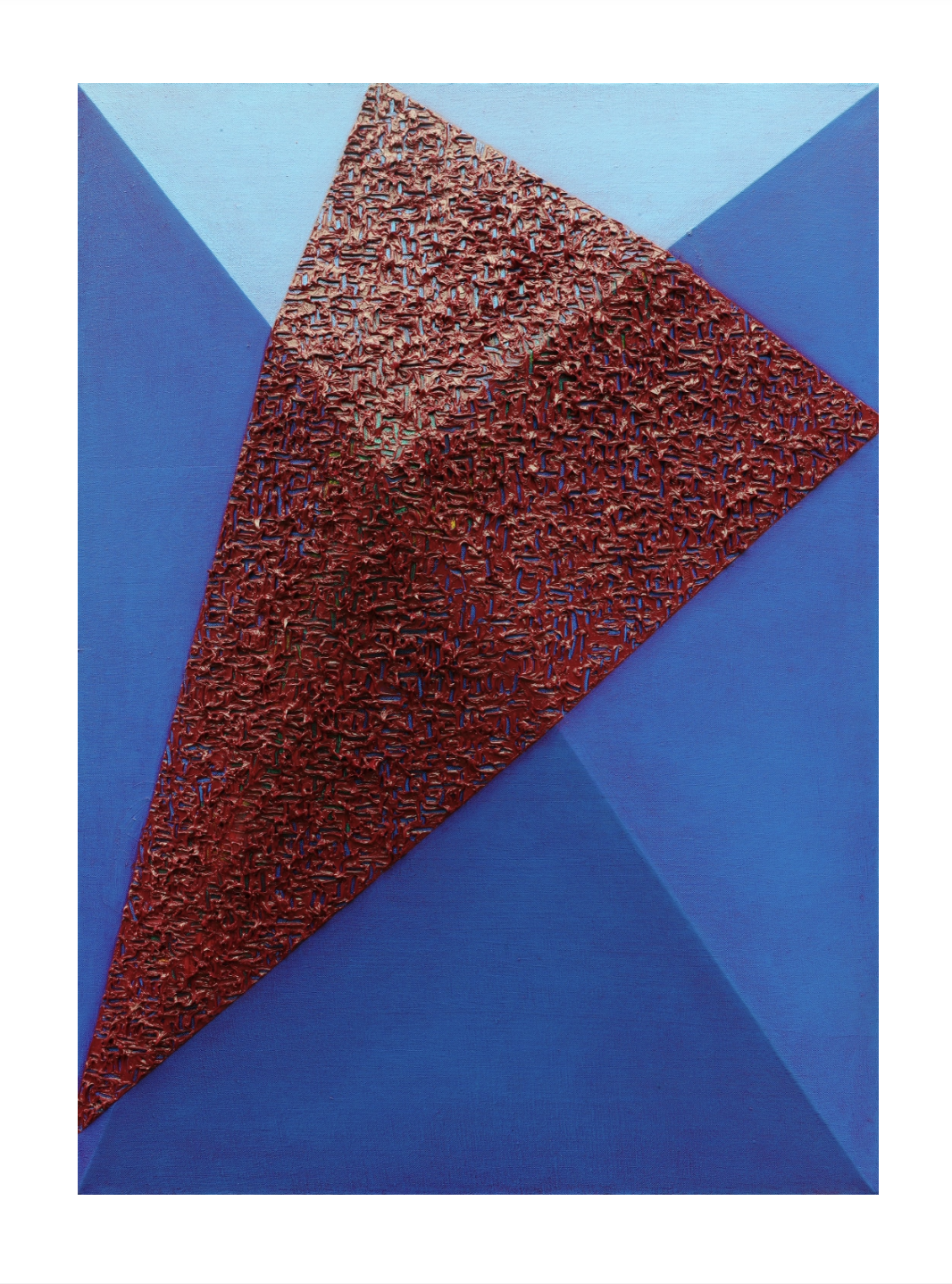
Rescued Lies 1, 2011

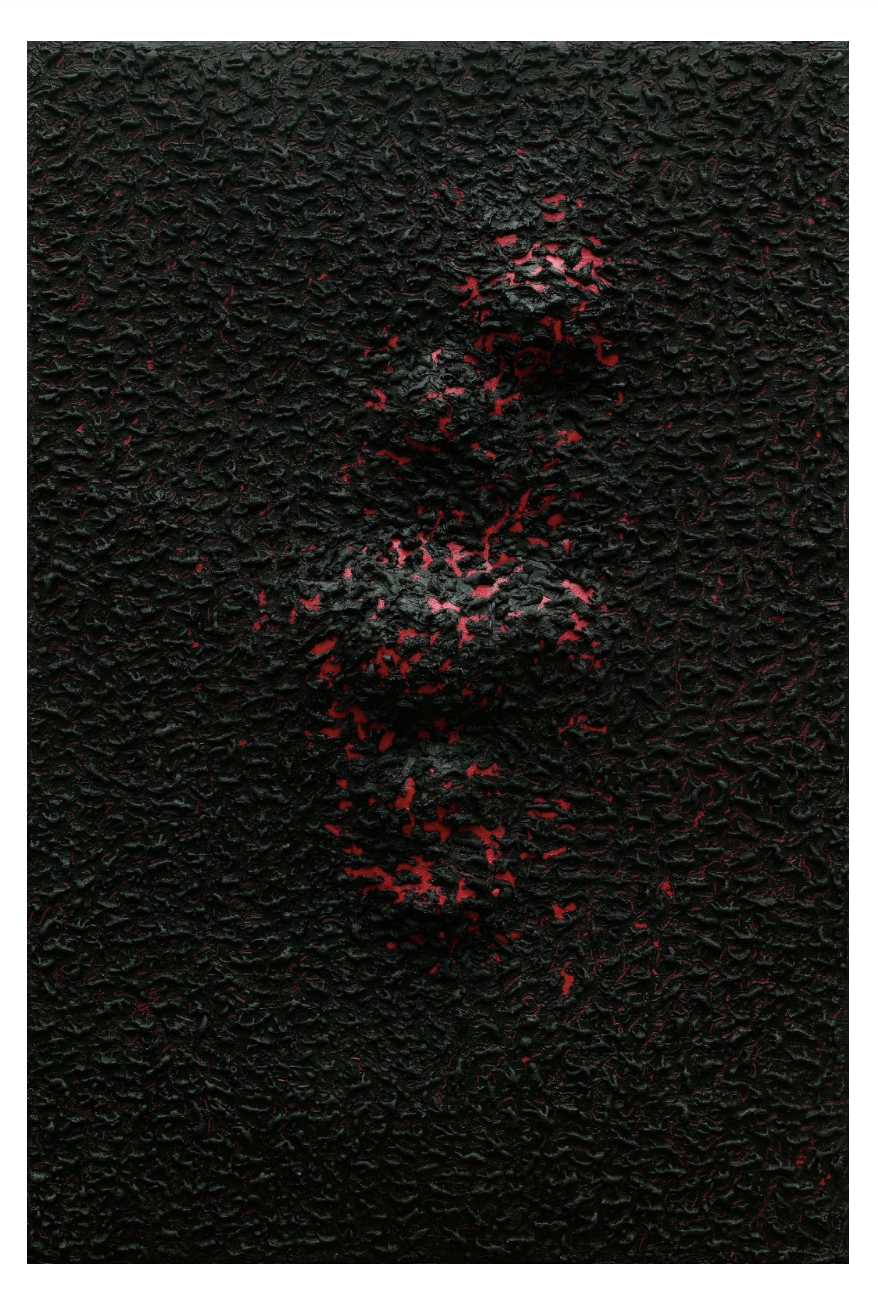
Omen of Labor Pains, 2011

== Selected solo exhibitions ==
- 2025, Weathering into Scrolls, Halcyon Gallery · Shanghai, China.
- 2024, Eruption ― Wang Xiaosong's Solo Exhibition, Schütz Art Museum, Austria.
- 2023, Tranquil Ecstasy ― Wang Xiaosong's Solo Exhibition, toSEE ART, Guangdong.
- 2023, The Art of Challenging ― Wang Xiaosong Solo Exhibition, ArtSun Space, Shanghai.
- 2019, A Pop Neo-Romanticism ― Wang Xiaosong Solo Exhibition, Glorious Jewel Art Center, Taipei, Shanghai.
- 2013, Touring exhibition, Breaking Boundaries ― New Works of Wang Xiaosong, Palazzo Medici-Riccardi, Florence, Italy.
- 2012, Touring exhibition, Unkontrollierte Ameisen ― Wang Xiaosong Solo Exhibitions, Künstlerhaus Wien, Vienna, Austria. Museum Ludwig Koblenz, Germany. Kunsthalle St. Annen Museum, Lubeck, Germany.

== Selected exhibitions ==
- 2025, Re-Constellations 2025 Hangzhou Triennial of Fiber Art, Zhejiang Art Museum, Hangzhou, China.
- 2025, Three Realms of Yingzhou, Gallery East, Osaka Expo, Osaka, Japan.
- 2025, Reality and Illusion: A New Genesis, PearlLam, Shanghai, China.
- 2025, Transcendence and Immanence ― The Intersection of Chinese and Western Abstraction, Contemporary Jindian Art Center, Hangzhou, China.
- 2024, China's Performance 2024, Tai Art Gallery, Shanghai.
- 2024, France ― China Art Exhibition, Art Museum of Sichuan Academy of Fine Arts, Chongqing.
- 2024, The 3rd Jinan International Biennal ― The Age of Human Wisdom, Shandong Art Museum, Ji’nan.
- 2023, Objective Visuals Modern and Contemporary Art Exhibition, JinChen YFM Art Gallery, Shanghai.
- 2023, Time Gravity ― Chengdu Biennale, Chengdu Art Museum, Tianfu Art Park, Sichuan.
- 2023, The Shape of Time, PearlLam Galleries, Shanghai.
- 2023, Ausbick-Die Landschaft Auf Der Brucke Ausstellung von Werken chinesischer Künstler in Deutschland, Changzhou Art Museum, Jiangsu.
- 2023, Ausbick-Die Landschaft Auf Der Brucke Ausstellung von Werken chinesischer Künstler in Deutschland, TAG Art Museum, Qingdao.
- 2023, Ausbick-Die Landschaft Auf Der Brucke Ausstellung von Werken chinesischer Künstler in Deutschland, New Gallery of Art, Shanghai.
- 2023, Exhibition in Halcyon Gallery, Shanghai.
- 2022, Ausblick Die Landschaft Auf Der Brücke ― Ausstellung Von Werken Chinesischer Künstler In Deutschland, Art Museum of National Grand Theater, Beijing.
- 2022, Communication Through Art Wuhan Biennale 2022, Wuhan Art Museum(Qintai).
- 2022, Nord Art 2022 International Art Exhibition, NordArt Museum of Modern Art, Germany.
- 2020, Colorful ― Exhibition of 10 Contemporary Art Masters, Jiaxing Art Museum, Jiaxing, China.
- 2020, Chinese Expressionist Art ― The First Exhibition, Huatai Top Art Community, Shanghai.
- 2019, The 8th Beijing International Art Biennale, China, 2019 A Colorful World and Shared Future, National Art Museum of China, Beijing.
- 2019, The Gaze of History ― Contemporary Chinese Art Revisited, Jupiter Museum of Art, Shenzhen.
- 2017, China Conversation, Museum Ludwig Koblenz, Germany.
- 2016, Mutual Supplementary and Wedge ― Collection of Chinese Artists Who Studied in Germany, Liu Haisu Art Museum, Shanghai.
- 2016, Invitational Exhibition of 20 Contemporary Art Masters, Wenzhou, China.
- 2015, Memory and Dream: the 6th Beijing International Art Biennial, National Art Museum of China, Beijing, China.
- 2015, Writing Non ― Writing Hangzhou International Modern Calligraphy Exhibition, Venue Museum of Contemporary Art, CAA, Hangzhou, China.

== Other exhibitions ==
- 2019, Art Vienna, Vienna, Austria, Schütz Fine Art-Chinese Department.
- 2018, Art & Antique Hofburg Wien, Vienna, Austria, Schütz Fine Art-Chinese Department.
- 2018, FAIR FOR ART VIENNA, Vienna, Austria, Schütz Fine Art-Chinese Department.
- 2017, Art & Antique Hofburg Wien, Vienna, Austria, Schütz Fine Art-Chinese Department.
- 2016, Art & Antique Residenz Salzburg, Salzburg, Austria, Schütz Fine Art-Chinese Department.
- 2016, Art Salzburg, Salzburg, Austria, Schütz Fine Art-Chinese Department.
- 2015, WIKAM Fair at the Künstlerhaus Vienna, Vienna, Austria, Schütz Fine Art-Chinese Department.
- 2015, Art & Antique Hofburg Wien, Vienna, Austria, Schütz Fine Art-Chinese Department.
- 2015, Art & Antique Residenz Salzburg, Salzburg, Austria, Schütz Fine Art-Chinese Department.
- 2015, Olympia International Art & Antiques Fair, London, United Kingdom, Schütz Fine Art-Chinese Department.
- 2014, Olympia International Art & Antiques Fair, London, United Kingdom,, Schütz Fine Art-Chinese Department.
- 2014, LAPADA Art & Antiques Fair, London, United Kingdom,, Schütz Fine Art, Schütz Fine Art-Chinese Department.
- 2014, ART.FAIR Köln, Cologne, Germany, Schütz Fine Art-Chinese Department.
- 2014, Art Salzburg, Salzburg, Austria, Schütz Fine Art-Chinese Department.
- 2014, Art Beijing, Art Solo 14, Taipei, Taiwan.
- 2014, China Arte Brasil, São Paulo, Brazil.
- 2013, Wang Xiaosong, Solo Exhibition, Pine's Art Gallery, Taipei, Taiwan.
- 2012-2013, Unruly Ants, Künstlerhaus Wien, Vienna, Austria.
- 2012-2013, Unruly Ants, Pallazzo Medici Riccardi, Florence, Italy.
- 2012-2013, Unruly Ants, Ludwig Museum, Koblenz, Germany.
- 2012-2013, Unruly Ants, Kunsthalle St. Annen, Lübeck, Germany.
- 2012, Art & Antique Residenz Salzburg, Salzburg, Austria, Schütz Fine Art-Chinese Department.
- 2011, 54. Biennale dell’Arte 2011, Venice, Italy.
- 2009, Empty Layer: Wang Xiaosong, Shanghai Duolun Museum of Modern Art, Shanghai, China.
- 2008, Interaction: Exhibition of Contemporary Chinese Oil Paintings, Wuhan Art Museum, Wuhan, China.
- 2008, Mix & Match Vision: Invitation for 2008, Contemporary Art Communication across Taiwan Straits, Wu Jiao Chao 800 Art Space, Shanghai, China.
- 2007, Exhibition of HD Schrader & Wang Xiaosong, Art Studio, Hamburg, Germany.
- 2007, Art Beijing 2007, Beijing, China.
- 2007, „Return“; Mountains and Rivers: A Tour of Exhibitions of Contemporary Chinese and German Artists, Lübeck Museum, Lübeck, Germany.
- 2006, Imagery Mt. Wuyi: The Debut Interactive Creation of Chinese, Vis-a-vis German Artists, International Travelling Exhibitions, Sanshang, Art Beijing, Shanghai Art Museum, China.
- 2006, Pressure and Power in Changeable Era, International Art Camp in Song Village, Beijing, China.
- 2005, Imagery Mt. Wuyi: Exhibition of the debut interactive creation of Chinese vis-a-vis German Artists, Villages in Mt. Wuyi, Wuyi Mountain Villa, Fujian, China.
- 2005, Not Dawn Yet, The Courtyard Gallery, Beijing, China.
- 2004, 10th National Artworks Exhibition, Beijing, China.
- 2004, 19th Warsaw International Biennial of Posters, Warsaw, Poland.
- 2002, Kamakura Geijutsu-kan, Kamakura Museum, Kamakura, Japan.
- 2001, International Biennial of New Watercolor Paintings, Kunststation, Kleinsassen, Germany.
- 2000, Open Studio, Nord Gallery, Berlin, Germany.
- 2000, Allegories of the Soul, Willy-Brandt-Haus, Berlin, Germany.
- 1999, Allegories of the Soul, Larissa Contemporary Art Centre, Larissa, Greece.
- 1999, International Biennial of New Watercolor Paintings, Kunststation, Hofbieber-Kleinsassen, German.
- 1999, Five Artists from China, Buch Messe Leipzig, Leipzig, Germany.
- 1999, Tell Us No Tales, Kulturinsel Galerie, Berlin, Germany.
- 1998, Exhibition, Galerie Just Art, Berlin, Germany.
- 1998, Art Initiative, C4 Galerie, Berlin, Germany.
- 1998, Celestial Axis, Prisma-Haus Berlin. Artist and Organizer, Berlin, Germany.
- 1998, Color and Vision, Werkstatt der Kultur, Berlin, Germany.
- 1997, Side by Side: Chinese Artists in Berlin, Artist and Organizer, Berlin, Germany.
- 1995, Exhibition in Robert-Koch-Institut Berlin, Berlin, Germany.
- 1994, Painting and Chinese Ink Drawings, Ausstellungshalle Deidesheim, Deidesheim, Germany.
- 1986, First National Exhibition of Fine Arts and Sports, National Art Museum of China, Beijing, China.
- 1986, The 10th National Artworks Exhibition, Beijing, China.

== Major curation ==
2024, Curator of Pavilion of the P.R. China of the 60th International Art Exhibition ― La Biennale di Venezia.

- 2021-now, Touring Exhibition, Compilation of Classics in The Flourishing Age ― A Comprehensive Collection of Ancient Chinese Paintings, Ningbo Art Museum; Shanghai Songjiang Culture and Art Center；National Museum of China Beijing; Jiaxing Art Museum; Zhejiang Art Museum; Hebei Museum; Sichuan Fine Arts Institute; University of Macau, etc. (The exhibition has attracted more than 7 million visitors in total).
- 2017-2019, World Internet Conference Wuzhen Summit, National Cultural Heritage Administration Exhibition.

== Publications ==
- Yinru Vihara Art Collections Wang Xiaosong, Taiwan Yingji Tangren Craft Press, China, 2021.
- Desire and Uproar Chinese-austrian Masterpieces 2016, English, 54 p., Edition Schütz, Beijing/New York/Vienna 2016.
- Le Nuove Opere Di Wang Xiaosong, Italian/English, 145 p., Palazzo Medici Riccardi, Florence, 2013. Catalogue of the exhibition "Breaking Boundaries": 8 August - 3 September 2013, Palazzo Medici Riccardi.
- Wang Xiaosong, Unruly Ants, German/English/Chinese, 235 p., Hirmer Verlag, Munich 2012. Catalogue of the exhibition "Unkontrollierte Ameisen": 24 August - 15 September 2013, Künstlerhaus Wien.
- Empty Layer - Collections of Wang Xiaosong, Hunan Fine Arts Publishing House, China, 2010.
- Collections of Wang Xiaosong (1992-2002), Hentrich & Hentrich Verlag, Germany, 2003.
- Pinocchio ist züruck ("Pinocchio has returned"), Shoten Publishers, Japan, 1998.

== Significant collections ==
- Royal Family of Saudi Arabia
- Schütz Fine Art ― Chinese Department, Austria
- Arthouse (Künstlerhaus Wien), Austria
- Barwell Art Foundation
- Museum of Contemporary Art Ludwig Koblenz, Germany
- Kunsthalle St. Anna, Lübeck, Germany
- Guangdong Museum of Art
- Art Museum of Sichuan Academy of Fine Arts, China
- Larissa Contemporary Art Centre, Greece
- Yinru Vihara
- China Olympic Committee
- China International Import Expo
