= Gülsün Karamustafa =

Turkish artist (born 1946)

- Born: 1946 (age 79–80); Ankara, Turkey
- Known for: Painting; Film-making; Sculpture

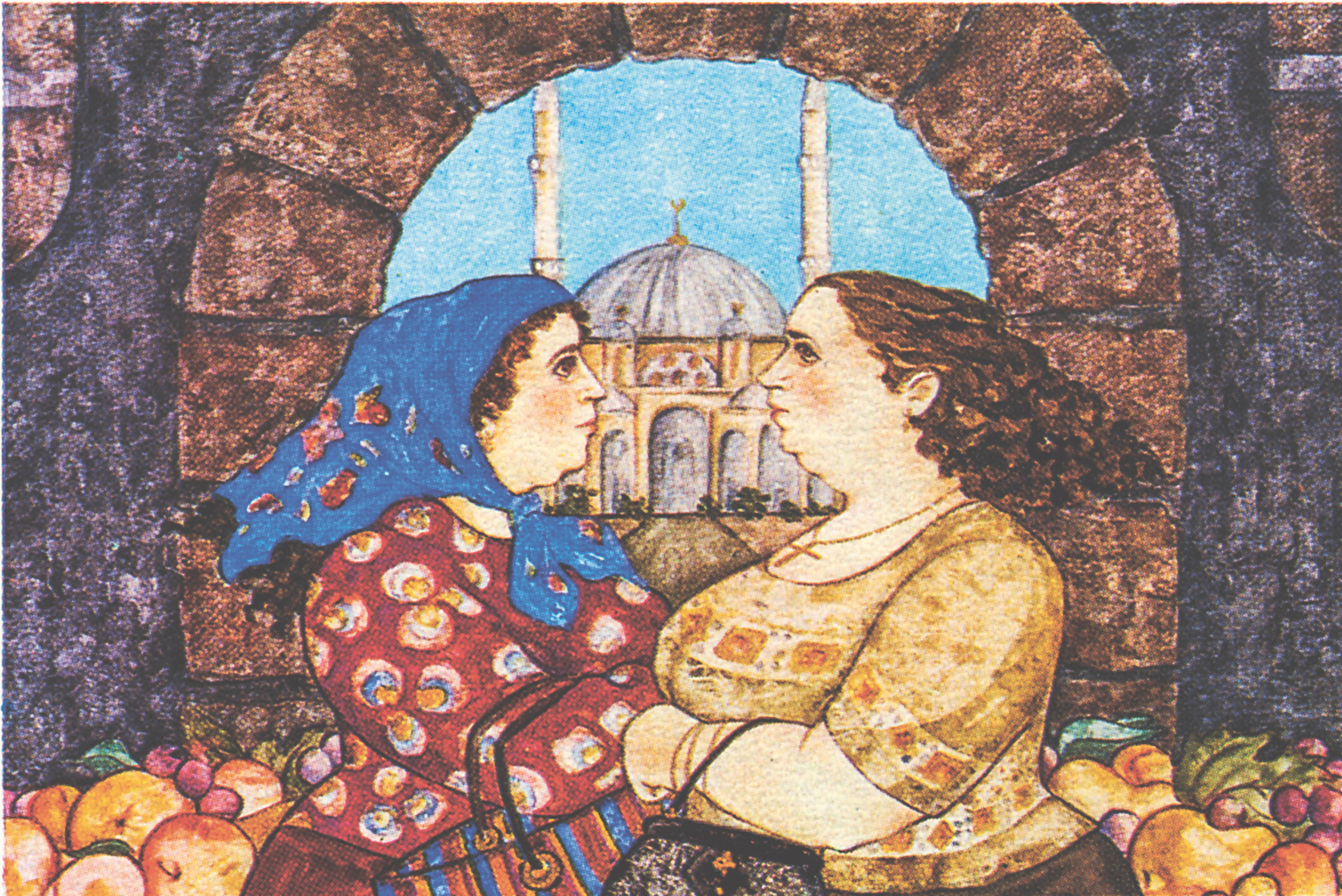

Gülsün Karamustafa (born 1946 in Ankara) is a visual artist and filmmaker recognised as "one of Turkey’s most outspoken and celebrated artists." Using personal and historical narratives, Karamustafa explores socio-political issues in modern Turkey and addresses themes including sexuality-gender, exile-ethnicity, and displacement-migration. "Hailed as one of Turkey’s most influential contemporary artists," her work reflects on the traumatic effects of nation building, as it responds to the processes of modernization, political turbulence, and civil rights in a period that includes the military coups of 1960, 1971, and 1980. Karamustafa was one of the laureates of the 2014 Prince Claus Award, a prestigious award presented to "individuals for their outstanding achievements in the field of culture and development and the positive effect of their work on their direct environment and the wider cultural or social field." She lives and works in Istanbul.

== Early life and education ==
Karamustafa was born in Ankara, Turkey in 1946. Her father Hikmet Münir Ebcioğlu was a radio presenter. Between 1958–63, Karamustafa attended high school at Ankara College. She graduated from Academy of Fine Arts, Istanbul, Department of Painting in 1969, where she was taught by Bedri Rahmi Eyüboğlu.

Influenced by 68s student revolts and clashes between right- and left-wing groups, Karamustafa became familiar with political activism during her university years. After her graduation she spent a year in London, where she was engaged in discussions on Vietnam War, feminism, and racism.

After her return to Istanbul in 1971, she was convicted of helping and abetting a political fugitive, and her passport was revoked for sixteen years, making her unable to travel or emigrate until 1987. This period witnesses a massive migration from the rural to the city, which significantly influenced her artistic language.

Between 1975–81 Karamustafa taught Basic Design at the State School of Applied Fine Arts where she also completed her PhD titled “The Interaction of Painting and Poster.” She then left her position to pursue her artistic practice.

== Works ==
"My relation with art did not develop from personal satisfaction or from the need to glorify what I do. I have been carrying art as a heavy mission from the very beginning. I always have the thought that I need to produce and carry this production to a significant place."

"Material leads me most of the time. It can be printed material, a found object, or a transient material—anything can have an impact on the shaping of the foundations of an artwork. Also the narrative can lead to a specific material. Or a couple of components that join together in an unexpected way can shape the work. What I’m trying to say is that there is a sense of volatility in all of my works. When I get this quality and integrate it into the work correctly, everything gains the capacity to be a component of the work… Material is extremely crucial in my works; it can be on equal terms with narrative."

Karamustafa's works can be broadly categorised into three thematics: migration, identity, memory, and boundaries; her personal history and experiences; gender and femininity. She works across a variety of different media, using varied techniques and methods, including installation, ready-mades, photographs and video.

During Turkey's military coups in the early 1970s, Karamustafa and her husband participated in student protests and in were arrested as a result in 1971. Karamustafa explores this in an artwork titled The Stage (1998) where she features a photo taken at the courtroom. Her time in prison is documented in the 1972 series Prison Paintings, displayed for the first time in her 2013 solo exhibition A Promised Exhibition at SALT, Istanbul. In talking about the series, Karamustafa explained “I made them in order to remember, in order to be able to keep [what happened] in mind. After serving time in the Maltepe, Selimiye and Sağmalcılar prisons in Istanbul, I was sent to Izmit Prison to be with the ones sentenced to penal servitude for life."

Until she received her passport in 1987, Karamustafa focused on the new hybrid visual culture caused by the massive waves of internal migration from rural Turkey to its major cities. During this period, she also co-directed Benim Sinemalarım (“My Movie Theaters,” 1990) and she was the art director of Bir Yudum Sevgi (“A Sip of Love,” 1984), Kupa Kızı (“The Heart Queen,” 1985), Asılacak Kadın (“The Woman Who Must Be Hanged,” 1986) and Gecenin Öteki Yüzü ("The Other Face of the Night," 1987). Her arabesk paintings and the use of carpets, fabric and ready-made kitsch objects are inspired by her experience in the movie industry.

Starting in the early 1990s, Karamustafa started experimenting with different media, focusing mainly on displacement, border-crossing, and identity. A key work from this period is Mystic Transport (1992), consisting of satin quilts in metal baskets, was first exhibited at the 3rd International Istanbul Biennial in 1992. The work encapsulates the hypermobile society of the decade. Presentation of an Early Representation (1996), Trellis of My Mind (1998), Fragmenting Fragments (1999) and Anti-Hamam Confessions (2010) problematizes postcolonial discourse. Memory of a Square (2005), a double-screen video installation, brings together historical records and personal experiences.

== Exhibitions ==
Karamustafa participated in the 2nd, 3rd and 4th International Istanbul Biennials, the 3rd and 10th Gwangju, 31st Sao Paulo, 8th Havana, 3rd Cetinje, the 4th Thessaloniki, the 1st Kiev, 11th Cairo, 3rd Singapore and 1st Seville biennials. She represented Turkey at the 60th Venice Biennale in 2024.

Her work was exhibited in Athens, Berlin, Cologne, Geneva, Istanbul, Kassel, Minnesota, Porto, Rio de Janeiro, Salzburg, Vienna, in institutions and museums such as Kunsthalle Fridericianum, Museu Serralves, Museum der Moderne Salzburg, National Museum of Contemporary Art-EMST Athens, Salzburg Kunstverein, Sammlung Essel, and Walker Art Center.

Chronographia at Hamburger Bahnhof–Museum für Gegenwart–Berlin (2016) and A Promised Exhibition at SALT, Istanbul (2013) presented a comprehensive survey of her works.

== Collections ==
Karamustafa's work in held in many public and private institutions, including Tate Modern, London; Guggenheim, New York; Museum of Modern Art, Warsaw; Museum of Contemporary Art, Chicago; MOMENTUM, Berlin; Musée d’Art Moderne de la Ville de Paris; MUMOK, Vienna; Sammlung Essl, Klosterneuburg; and Van Abbemuseum, Eindhoven.

== Awards ==
The artist received many awards, such as Prince Claus Award, Netherlands (2014); Simavi Visual Arts Award, Istanbul (2002); Onufri International Exhibition, Special Award, Tirana (2001); the 9th Fajr International Film Festival, Special Jury Award for her film My Cinemas, Iran (1991); Exhibition of New Trends in Art, Istanbul (1987); and Contemporary Artists Award, Istanbul (1985).
