= Sandra Gamarra =

Peruvian artist

Sandra Gamarra (born 1972), also known as Sandra Gamarra Heshiki, is a Peruvian artist. Her work is included in the collections of the Museum of Modern Art, New York, the Tate Museum, London, and the Museo de Arte Contemporáneo de Lima.
