= Massimo Bartolini =

Italian artist

Massimo Bartolini (born 1962 in Cecina) is an Italian artist. Bartolini works are mainly installations, but also creates video and photographs.

In 2023, he was appointed to represent Italy as unique artist at the national pavilion of the LX Venice Biennale.

== Selected works ==
- Organi (2008)
- An Outdoor Library (2012)
- Aiuole (2000)
