= Lorenzo Marini =

Italian writer (born 1958)

Lorenzo Marini (born 1958, Monselice) is an Italian creative director, author, and artist.

== Biography ==
After obtaining his degree in architecture in Venice in 1980, Marini worked with a number of Italian advertising agencies: Ogilvy, Leo Burnett, Canard and Gruppo Armando Testa. In 1997 in Milan he founded Lorenzo Marini & Associati, an agency with branches in Milan and Turin and which in 2010 opened an office in New York.

In his career as an art director, Marini has received over 500 awards in Italy and internationally, including the Lion d’Or at the Cannes International Advertising Festival for his campaign for Agnesi pasta in 1985. A multidisciplinary artist, over the years Marini has made inroads in many branches of the arts: drawing cartoons, directing, painting and particularly writing, with the publication of several works of non-fiction and two novels, one of which has been translated into English.

For Italy’s RAI 2 radio station, he has presented “Il giorno della marmotta” (“Groundhog Day”), a program about creativity, together with Dario Vergassola.

Marini’s art career was mentored by Emilio Vedova, after completing his degree in architecture from the University of Venice. Only in 2010 did Marini begin exhibiting his artworks to the public. The first exhibitions were held in New York and Miami, and he also participated at Art Basel Miami. In 2016 at the Palazzo della Permanente in Milan he unveiled “Type Art”, a movement of which Marini is the founder and which in 2017 led him to exhibit at the 57th Biennale Arte in Venice (at the Armenia Pavilion).

In 2017 Marini was conferred with the Pubblicità nell'Arte award, an award introduced at the 11th NC Awards.

Marini has created the logo and branding for Lavazza Espression, Galleria Borghese, Conai, Lux Vide, Fastweb, Novamont, Spuma Di Sciampagna, Eicma, Oltremare, Faac, Agnesi, and Zucchi.

Since 2019 he has collaborated with Cramum and Sabino Maria Frassà: the AlphaCUBE installation presented for DesignWeek 2019 (by Ventura Projects) was exhibited in Venice (for the 58th Biennale Arte), Dubai and finally in Los Angeles.

In 2020 in Los Angeles, Marini received the Mobius Advertising Award in an international competition for creativity, for the new alphabet of his creation, Futurtype.

In the same year, he presented his new cycle of works, titled "Typemoticon", at a personal exhibition, "Out of Words", at Gaggenau Hub in Milan.

In September 2020 he designed the poster for the Venice Pavilion at the Venice Biennale, titled Aperture Straordinarie ("Extraordinary Openings").

In 2020, at the end of the lockdown period in Italy during the COVID-19 health emergency, Marini created an artistic event in the main cities of Italy with dynamic and static installations, welcoming residents and workers back to those cities. In these installations Marini’s liberated alphabets are a metaphor for people coming together once again.

TypeArt is an art movement founded by Marini that celebrates the aesthetic beauty of letters.

In 2021 Marini received the AVI award for the most visited exhibition in Italy of contemporary art, Di Segni e Di Sogni ("Of Signs and of Dreams"), at the Santa Maria della Scala museum complex in Siena.

In 2023 Marini brought his "Raintype Installation" to exhibitions in Los Angeles and Palm Beach, where it was judged one of the best-loved immersive works of the exhibition.

In 2024 Marini exhibited in the Far East, in Seoul at the Korea World Art Expo, and in Beijing at the Dongyuan theater/gallery, where his contemporary calligraphic quest met with great interest.

Also in 2024 he exhibited four Blackhole works at the Venice Biennale, from 20 April to 24 November at the Grenada National Pavilion.

For the Galleria Nazionale d'Arte Moderna e Contemporaria in Rome, Marini created Futurpioggia ("Future Rain"), an installation of Futurist letters to open and close the exhibition “Il Tempo del Futurismo” which ran from 3 December to 27 April 2025.

== Publications ==
- The Man of the Tulips: A story lived four hundred years ago that could be lived again tomorrow, 2015 – Lorenzo Marini (ASIN B00TEHLSUQ)
- L'uomo dei tulipani. Una storia vissuta quattrocento anni fa che potrebbe rivivere domani, 2002 – Lupetti Editori di Comunicazione (ISBN 88-8391-268-3)
- Vaniglia. Una storia d'amore tratta da un film che nessuno ha mai girato, 2003 – Lupetti Editori di Comunicazione (ISBN 88-8391-099-0)
- Note, 2005 – Logo Fausto Lupetti Editore (ISBN 88-97686-51-6)
- Questo libro non ha titolo perché è scritto da un art director, 2006 – Logo Fausto Lupetti Editore (ISBN 88-8391-132-6)
- Visual, 2009 – Logo Fausto Lupetti Editore (ISBN 88-95962-10-9)
- Logos Alphabet from Marini to Lorenzo, 2014 - Logo Fausto Lupetti Editore (ISBN 978-88-68740-77-1)
- Typeart, 2022 - Logo Fausto Lupetti Editore (ISBN 978-88-6874-089-4)
