= Pakui Hardware =

Lithuanian artist duo

Pakui Hardware is a Lithuanian artist duo, composed of Neringa Černiauskaite and Ugnius Gelguda since 2014.

== Bibliography ==
- Bucknell, Alice (May 17, 2021). "Pakui Hardware's Vision of Post-Pandemic Healthcare". Frieze. No. 220. ISSN 0962-0672.
- Herbert, Martin (April 1, 2021). "Take the Long View with Pakui Hardware". ArtReview.
- "Pakui Hardware to Represent Lithuania at 60th Venice Biennale". Artforum. December 8, 2022.
- Vukadin, Ana (October 28, 2021). "Pakui Hardware". Artforum.
