= Chinese Calligraphers Association =

Professional association

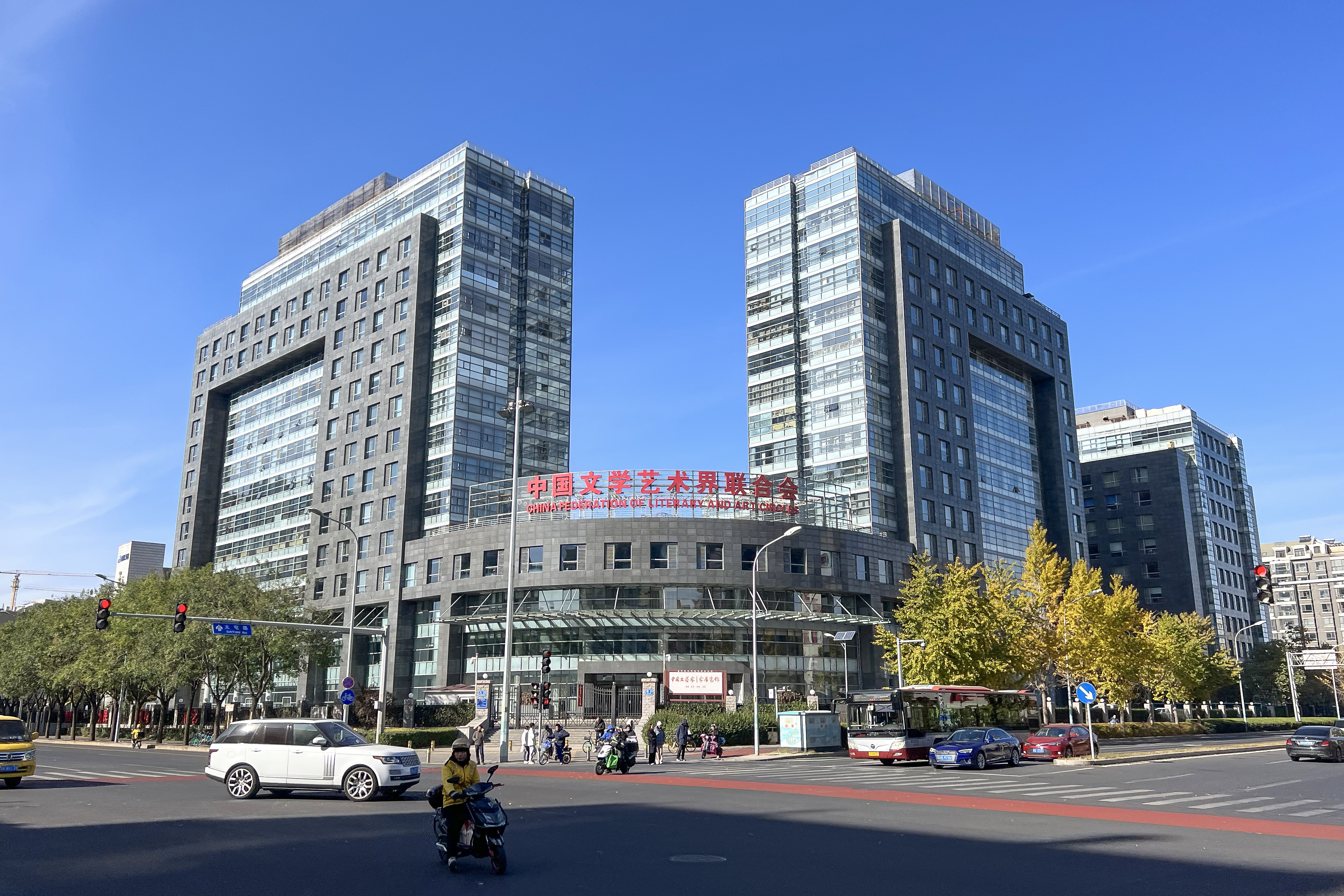
China Federation of Literary and Art Circles headquarters

The Chinese Calligraphers Association (CCA, Chinese: 中国书法家协会) is a professional organization of Chinese calligraphers and is a member of the China Federation of Literary and Art Circles.

== History ==
In November 1980, supported by the China Federation of Literary and Artistic Associations, the Preparatory Committee of the Chinese Calligraphers' Association was formed and convened its inaugural meeting in Beijing on November 7. The First National Congress of the Chinese Calligraphers' Association convened in the Great Hall of the People in Beijing from May 5 to May 9, 1981. Shu Tong was appointed as the inaugural president of the Chinese Calligraphers Association. It comprises 16 professional committees. In January 1983, a group from the Chinese Calligraphy Association visited Japan at the request of the Japan-China Cultural Exchange Association.
