= List of national pavilions at the 59th Venice Biennale =

Nations participating in the 2022 art exhibition

The 59th Venice Biennale was an international contemporary art exhibition held between April and November 2022. The Venice Biennale takes place biennially in Venice, Italy, and participating nations select artists to show at their pavilions, hosted in the Venice Giardini, Arsenale, and palazzos throughout the city. The 2019 Venice Biennale's 90 national pavilions was a record for national participation.

== National pavilions ==
Nation/ region	Location	Artist(s)	Curator(s)	Ref
Albania	Arsenale	Lumturi Blloshmi	Adela Demetja	
Argentina	Arsenale	Mónica Heller	Alejo Ponce de León	
Australia	Giardini	Marco Fusinato	Alexie Glass-Kantor	
Austria	Giardini	Jakob Lena Knebl and Ashley Hans Scheirl	Karola Kraus	
Belgium	Giardini	Francis Alÿs	Hilde Teerlinck	
Bolivia	Around Venice	Warmichacha Collective	Roberto Aguilar Quisbert - Mamani Mamani, Judith Cuba	
Brazil	Giardini	Jonathas de Andrade	Jacopo Crivelli Visconti, José Olympio da Veiga Pereira	
Canada	Giardini	Stan Douglas	Reid Shier	
Catalonia	Around Venice	Lara Fluxà	Oriol Fondevila	
Croatia	Around Venice	Tomo Savić-Gecan	Elena Filipović	
Denmark	Giardini	Uffe Isolotto	Jacob Lillemose	
Estonia	Giardini (Dutch pavilion)	Kristina Norman and Bita Razavi	Corina Apostol, Maria Arusoo	
Finland	Giardini	Pilvi Takala	Christina Li	
France	Giardini	Zineb Sedira		
Germany	Giardini	Maria Eichhorn	Yilmaz Dziewior	
Great Britain	Giardini	Sonia Boyce	TBD	
Hong Kong	Around Venice	Angela Su	Freya Chou	
Iceland	Around Venice	Sigurður Guðjónsson	Mónica Bello	
Ireland	Arsenale	Niamh O'Malley	Temple Bar Gallery + Studios Curatorial Team	
Israel	Giardini	Ilit Azoulay	Dr. Shelley Harten	
Italy	Arsenale	Gian Maria Tosatti	Eugenio Viola	
Kosovo	Arsenale	Jakup Ferri	Inke Arns	
Luxembourg	Around Venice	Tina Gillen		
Malta	Arsenale	Arcangelo Sassolino, Giuseppe Schembri Bonaci, Brian Schembri	Keith Sciberras, Jeffrey Uslip	
Namibia	La Certosa	Renn (namibian artist)	Marco Furio Ferrario	
Netherlands	Around Venice	Melanie Bonajo	Maaike Gouwenberg, Geir Haraldseth, Soraya Pol	
Nepal	Around Venice	Tsherin Sherpa	Sheelasha Rajbhandari, Hit Man Gurung	
New Zealand	Around Venice	Yuki Kihara	Natalie King	
Nordic Pavilion	Giardini	Pauliina Feodoroff, Máret Ánne Sara, Anders Sunna		
North Macedonia	Around Venice	Robert Jankuloski and Monika Moteska	Ana Frangovska, Sanja Kojić Mladenov	
Poland	Giardini	Małgorzata Mirga-Tas	Zachęta National Gallery of Art, Wojciech Szymański, Joanna Warsza	
Serbia	Giardini	Vladimir Nikolić	Biljana Ćirić	
Slovenia	Around Venice	Marko Jakše	Robert Simonišek	
Spain	Giardini	Ignasi Aballí	Beatriz Espejo	
Switzerland	Giardini	Latifa Echakhch	Francesco Stocchi	
Taiwan	Around Venice	Sakuliu Pavavaljung	Patrick Flores	
Turkey	Around Venice	Füsun Onur	Bige Örer	
Ukraine	Arsenale	Pavlo Makov	Lizaveta German, Maria Lanko, Borys Filonenko	
United Arab Emirates	Around Venice	Mohamed Ahmed Ibrahim	Maya Allison	
United States	Giardini	Simone Leigh	Eva Respini	
Venezuela	Giardini	Palmira Correa, César Vázquez, Mila Quast, Jorge Recio	Zacarías García	
