= 59th Venice Biennale =

2022 international contemporary art exhibition

- Genre: Art exhibition
- Begins: April 23, 2022
- Ends: November 27, 2022
- Location: Venice
- Country: Italy
- Previous event: 58th Venice Biennale (2019)
- Next event: 60th Venice Biennale (2024)

The 59th Venice Biennale was an international contemporary art exhibition held between April and November 2022, having been delayed a year due to the COVID pandemic. The Venice Biennale takes place biennially in Venice, Italy. Artistic director Cecilia Alemani curated its central exhibition.

== Background ==
The Venice Biennale is an international art biennial exhibition held in Venice, Italy. Often described as "the Olympics of the art world", participation in the Biennale is a prestigious event for contemporary artists. The festival has become a constellation of shows: a central exhibition curated by that year's artistic director, national pavilions hosted by individual nations, and independent exhibitions throughout Venice. The Biennale parent organization also hosts regular festivals in other arts: architecture, dance, film, music, and theater.

Outside of the central, international exhibition, individual nations produce their own shows, known as pavilions, as their national representation. Nations that own their pavilion buildings, such as the 30 housed on the Giardini, are responsible for their own upkeep and construction costs as well. Nations without dedicated buildings create pavilions in the Venice Arsenale and palazzos throughout the city.

The 59th Biennale ran from April 23, 2022, through November 27. Originally scheduled for the year prior, the COVID-19 pandemic postponed the 2020 architecture biennale into 2021 and the art biennale into 2022. As a result of the displacement, the art biennale coincided with Documenta 15, another major contemporary art exhibition.

== Central exhibition ==
Cecilia Alemani, chief curator of High Line Art, served as the 59th Venice Biennale's artistic director. Her central exhibition is titled "The Milk of Dreams", after a book by the English-born Mexican surrealist artist Leonora Carrington filled with magical tales in which everything can be transformed through imagination. The exhibition follows three themes: body representation and metamorphosis, human relationships with technology, and the relationship between the body and Earth. Alemani developed the concept from conversations with artists and questions following the COVID-19 pandemic. Her curator's essay invokes feminist activist Silvia Federici and science fiction writer Ursula Le Guin.

"The Milk of Dreams" features 213 artists. Unlike prior shows, in which the majority of artists identified as male, instead less than 10 percent of Alemani's artists identified as male. Alemani underplayed this element and did not describe her show as overtly feminist, but has spoken about questioning the "universal ideal of the white, male 'Man of Reason' as the fixed center of the universe and measure of all things". Many of the central exhibition's artists are associated with the 20th century avant-garde. Nearly half of Alemani's artists are deceased, much higher in proportion than prior Biennales. These avant-garde artists are underrepresented, having been underrecognized in their time, and the Biennale services to highlight their work.

After the exhibition was postponed one year due to the coronavirus pandemic, Alemani hoped to use the extra year to prepare new projects and use the opening, which now precedes the Italian Liberation Day, to mark an occasion of togetherness. Alemani is the first Italian woman to serve as the Biennale's artistic director. She previously curated the 2017 Biennale's Italian pavilion. Her husband, Massimiliano Gioni, curated the 2013 Biennale.

== National pavilions ==
A total of 80 national pavilions participated in the 59th edition, with five countries participating for the first time: Cameroon, Namibia, Nepal, Oman and Uganda. Each country selected artists to represent their pavilion, ostensibly with an eye to the Biennale's theme. As a sign of solidarity Ukraine and against war, Russian pavilion curator Raimundas Malašauskas withdrew his project and Russia's pavilion remained closed. In a statement, Alexandra Sukhareva, one of the artists participating in Russia's Pavilion, posted in a statement on Instagram that "there is no place for art when civilians are dying under the fire of missiles, when citizens of Ukraine are hiding in shelters [and] when Russian protestors are getting silenced".

Unlike prior biennales, in which there were clear frontrunners for the jury recognition of best national pavilion, such as Germany's Faust in 2017 or Lithuania's Sun & Sea in 2019, there was no such frontrunner in 2022.

| Nation/ region | Location | Artist(s) | Curator(s) | Ref |
|---|---|---|---|---|
| Albania | Arsenale | Lumturi Blloshmi | Adela Demetja | |
| Argentina | Arsenale | Mónica Heller | Alejo Ponce de León | |
| Australia | Giardini | Marco Fusinato | Alexie Glass-Kantor | |
| Austria | Giardini | Jakob Lena Knebl and Ashley Hans Scheirl | Karola Kraus | |
| Belgium | Giardini | Francis Alÿs | Hilde Teerlinck | |
| Bolivia | Around Venice | Warmichacha Collective | Roberto Aguilar Quisbert - Mamani Mamani, Judith Cuba | |
| Brazil | Giardini | Jonathas de Andrade | Jacopo Crivelli Visconti, José Olympio da Veiga Pereira | |
| Canada | Giardini | Stan Douglas | Reid Shier | |
| Catalonia | Around Venice | Lara Fluxà | Oriol Fondevila | |
| Croatia | Around Venice | Tomo Savić-Gecan | Elena Filipović | |
| Denmark | Giardini | Uffe Isolotto | Jacob Lillemose | |
| Estonia | Giardini (Dutch pavilion) | Kristina Norman and Bita Razavi | Corina Apostol, Maria Arusoo | |
| Finland | Giardini | Pilvi Takala | Christina Li | |
| France | Giardini | Zineb Sedira | | |
| Germany | Giardini | Maria Eichhorn | Yilmaz Dziewior | |
| Great Britain | Giardini | Sonia Boyce | TBD | |
| Hong Kong | Around Venice | Angela Su | Freya Chou | |
| Iceland | Around Venice | Sigurður Guðjónsson | Mónica Bello | |
| Ireland | Arsenale | Niamh O'Malley | Temple Bar Gallery + Studios Curatorial Team | |
| Israel | Giardini | Ilit Azoulay | Dr. Shelley Harten | |
| Italy | Arsenale | Gian Maria Tosatti | Eugenio Viola | |
| Kosovo | Arsenale | Jakup Ferri | Inke Arns | |
| Luxembourg | Around Venice | Tina Gillen | | |
| Malta | Arsenale | Arcangelo Sassolino, Giuseppe Schembri Bonaci, Brian Schembri | Keith Sciberras, Jeffrey Uslip | |
| Namibia | La Certosa | Renn (namibian artist) | Marco Furio Ferrario | |
| Netherlands | Around Venice | Melanie Bonajo | Maaike Gouwenberg, Geir Haraldseth, Soraya Pol | |
| Nepal | Around Venice | Tsherin Sherpa | Sheelasha Rajbhandari, Hit Man Gurung | |
| New Zealand | Around Venice | Yuki Kihara | Natalie King | |
| Nordic Pavilion | Giardini | Pauliina Feodoroff, Máret Ánne Sara, Anders Sunna | | |
| North Macedonia | Around Venice | Robert Jankuloski and Monika Moteska | Ana Frangovska, Sanja Kojić Mladenov | |
| Poland | Giardini | Małgorzata Mirga-Tas | Zachęta National Gallery of Art, Wojciech Szymański, Joanna Warsza | |
| Serbia | Giardini | Vladimir Nikolić | Biljana Ćirić | |
| Slovenia | Around Venice | Marko Jakše | Robert Simonišek | |
| Spain | Giardini | Ignasi Aballí | Beatriz Espejo | |
| Switzerland | Giardini | Latifa Echakhch | Francesco Stocchi | |
| Taiwan | Around Venice | Sakuliu Pavavaljung | Patrick Flores | |
| Turkey | Around Venice | Füsun Onur | Bige Örer | |
| Ukraine | Arsenale | Pavlo Makov | Lizaveta German, Maria Lanko, Borys Filonenko | |
| United Arab Emirates | Around Venice | Mohamed Ahmed Ibrahim | Maya Allison | |
| United States | Giardini | Simone Leigh | Eva Respini | |
| Venezuela | Giardini | Palmira Correa, César Vázquez, Mila Quast, Jorge Recio | Zacarías García | |

== Awards ==
A jury presented the three main prizes:

- Golden Lion for best national participation: British pavilion (Sonia Boyce)
  - Special recognition: French pavilion, Ugandan pavilion
- Golden Lion for best artist of the central exhibition: Simone Leigh
  - Special recognition: Shuvinai Ashoona and Lynn Hershman Leeson
- Silver Lion for the most promising young artist of the exhibition: Ali Cherri

The 59th Biennale's Golden Lion for lifetime achievement went to Katharina Fritsch and Cecilia Vicuña.

== Reception ==
The 2022 Biennale was its most attended edition with over 800,000 tickets sold. While the 2022 Biennale had sold a third more tickets than the 2019 Biennale, it was also 14 percent longer, lasting 197 days.

Recounting the year's biggest moments, ArtNews said that two Black women winning the Beinnale's top awards was both a "legendary moment and a possible sign that the canonization of Black female artists was ... underway". The effects of the Russian invasion of Ukraine was another big moment, felt at the Biennale with the closure of the Russian pavilion and conspicuous absence of Russian oligarchs.
