= Adela Demetja =

Albanian curator (born 1984)

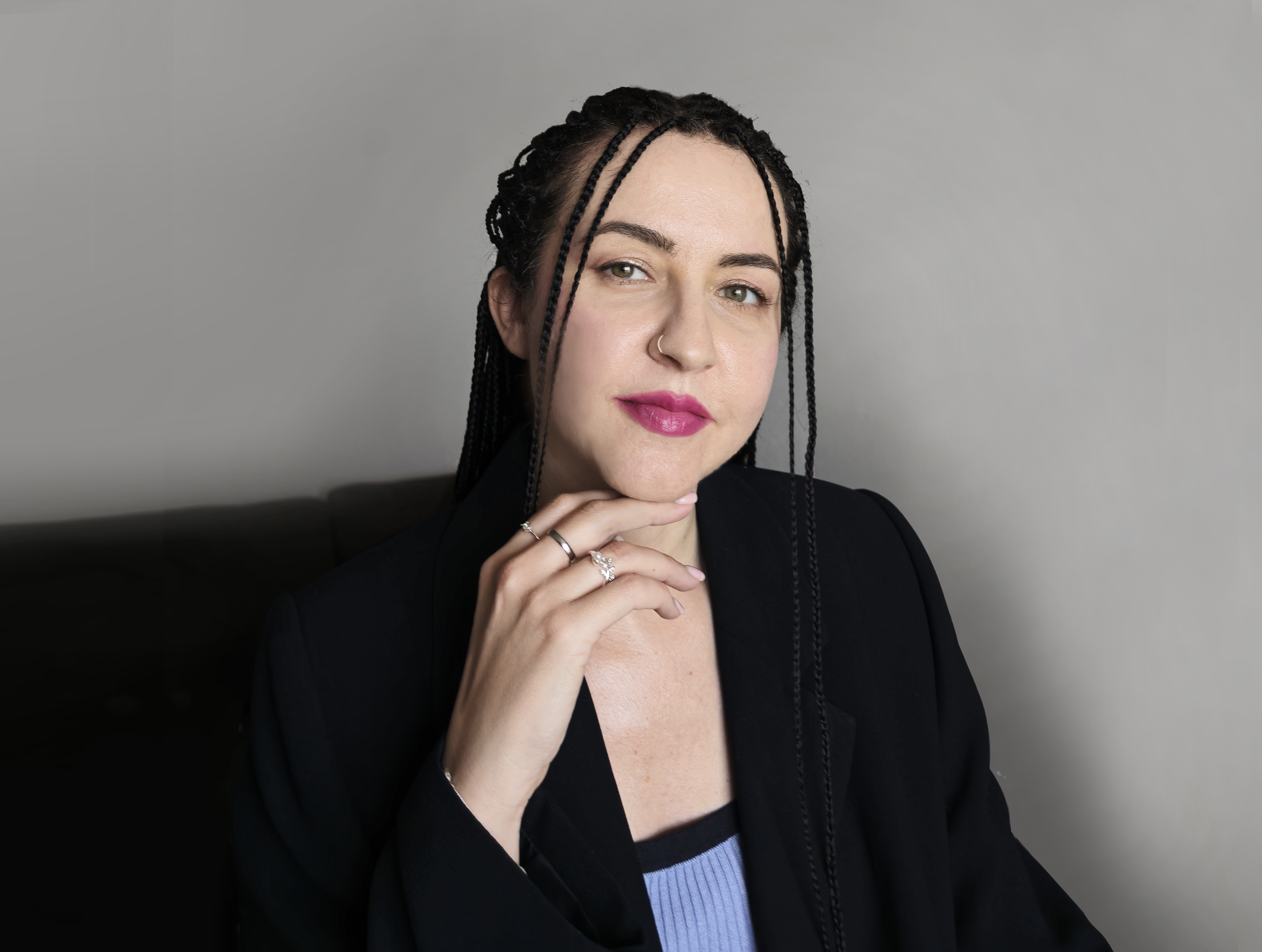
- Demetja in 2024
- Born: 1984 (age 41–42); Tirana, Albania
- Occupation: Art curator
- Years active: 2010–present

Adela Demetja (born 1984 in Tirana) is an Albanian art curator and author. She studied painting and then curatorial and critical studies. She is the executive director of the Albanian Visual Arts Network, and founded the Tirana Art Lab, a centre for contemporary art in Albania. Demetja has curated exhibitions internationally, including the Albanian Pavilion at the 59th Venice Biennale, in Greece and in Italy.

== Education ==
Demetja was born in 1984 in Tirana, Albania. Demetja trained as a painter and studied fine arts at the Academy of Arts in Tirana from 2002 to 2006, and then at Karlsruhe University of Arts and Design in Karlsruhe. She has a master's degree in curatorial and critical studies from Goethe University in Frankfurt, Germany.

== Career ==
Since May 2024, Demetja has been the interim executive director of the Albanian Visual Arts Network. In 2010 she established the Tirana Art Lab – Center for Contemporary Art, of which she is director. The centre aims to promote "emerging artists and contemporary art from Albania as well as from Central, Eastern, and South Eastern Europe", and Demetja has a special interest in promoting women artists. She also works as an independent curator through Europe. She has been described as a "prominent figure in the Albanian art scene".

She curator exhibitions at the Albanian Pavilion at the 59th Venice Biennale, Vienna Contemporary International Art Fair, at the Action Field Kodra Festival in Thessaloniki, Greece, and in Florence, Italy. In 2015 she co-curated an exhibition in a bomb shelter built by Tito in Konjic, Bosnia and Herzegovina.

=== Exhibitions ===
Thematic exhibitions she has curated include:

- 2023-2024 – Terminal for Tirana, art work in public space by Karolina Halatek in Tirana, Albania.
- 2022 – Lumturi Blloshmi. From Scratch], Albanian Pavilion at the 59th Venice Biennale.
- 2021 – Ambitions with the curator Erëmirë Krasniqi, National Gallery of Arts Tirana, Albania and the National Gallery of Kosovo, Prishtina.
- 2020 – A for Unapologetic Vaska Emanouilova Gallery and DOZA Gallery, Sofia Bulgaria, Organized by DOMA Art Foundation.
- 2019 – NEXUS 1'', time-based exhibition for the stage, Time Based Festival, Portland Institute for Contemporary Art, Portland, Oregon, US.
- 2016 – Focus: Ex-Yugoslavia and Albania, Vienna Contemporary, Vienna, Austria , works by young and established artists from these countries presented by the institutions: Tirana Art Lab – Center for Contemporary Art, Tirana, Albania.
- 2016 – Remembering in Form, Gallery Heike Strelow Frankfurt am Main, Germany.
- 2015 – D-0 Ark Underground, Third Edition of International Project Biennale, Konjic, Bosnia and Herzegovina.
- 2013 – The Aesthetic of the Small Act, Tessaloniki, Greece.

== See also ==
- Albanian art
- List of people from Frankfurt
- List of people from Tirana
