= Sakuliu Pavavaljung =

Taiwanese Paiwan artist (born 1960)

Sakuliu Pavavaljung (Paiwan pronunciation: [sakuˈliu pavaˈvaʎuŋ]; born 1960) is a Taiwanese Paiwan artist.

== Early life ==
Sakuliu Pavavaljung was born in 1960, in Sandimen, Pingtung County, and resides in the village of Koushe. His family made iron knives for several generations. Sakuliu Pavavaljung's father named him after his paternal grandmother's father. Sakuliu Pavavaljung's three older siblings had died in infancy, so his father chose the name to evoke an ancestor that evil spirits had respected. Etan Pavavaljung, his younger brother, is a painter and woodcutter. Their mother is a singer and artist specializing in weaving and embroidery.

Sakuliu Pavavaljung pursued electrical engineering at National Nei-Pu Senior Agricultural-Industrial Vocational High School. Upon graduation in 1978, he began teaching carving and pottery techniques. Sakuliu Pavavaljung became a licensed electrician in 1979, and began working in his home village as an electrician and plumber, before continuing in similar roles for the Sandimen Township Office.

== Career ==
Sakuliu Pavavaljung's art is inspired by the intersection of his native Paiwan culture and changes within contemporary life. As the Paiwan language does not have a word for artist, Sakuliu Pavavaljung considers himself a Pulima, a Paiwan name that means 'many hands', bestowed upon those with artistic skill. Though his output spans several types of art, such as paintings, sculptures, ceramics, architecture, and installation art, Sakuliu Pavavaljung is credited with reviving ceramics within the Paiwan culture, as Paiwan nobility had used earthenware pots as betrothal gifts prior to the loss of that art in subsequent generations. Sakuliu Pavavaljung named his son Reretan, Paiwan for 'earthenware pot'.

Sakuliu Pavavaljung has participated in the making of two films about Paiwan culture. He was the subject of Sakuliu (1994), which was directed by Lee Daw-ming, and shot by Lin Jian-siang, and began filming in 1992. The director and cinematographer had been in Sakuliu Pavavaljung's life for one year prior to formally filming him. The Last Chieftain was released in 1998 and credited Sakuliu Pavavaljung as a co-director alongside Lee Daw-ming. The Last Chieftain depicts leadership in Paiwan settlements and featured Sakuliu Pavavaljung speaking with Lee about political and economic issues.

In 2018, Sakuliu Pavavaljung became the first Taiwanese indigenous artist to receive a National Award for Arts in the fine arts category. He was selected to represent Taiwan at the 59th Venice Biennale. In 2021, Sakuliu Pavavaljung and another Taiwanese artist, Chang En-man, were invited to join ruangrupa, an Indonesian artists' collective selected to serve as artistic director for documenta fifteen. After sexual assault allegations against Sakuliu Pavavaljung surfaced in December 2021, the Taipei Fine Arts Museum stated in January 2022 that his work would no longer be featured at the 59th Venice Biennale. documenta suspended Sakuliu Pavavaljung's participation in the event. The National Award for Arts was revoked in 2026, after Sakuliu Pavavaljung had exhausted all appeals in the legal case associated with the sexual assault allegations.

Aside from his art, Sakuliu Pavavaljung has interviewed a number of tribal elders and recorded aspects of Paiwan culture, such as names and their meanings.

== Controversy ==
After artist Kuo Yu-ping published a story on Facebook about a Paiwan artist named Kulusa who had sexually assaulted a teenaged female fan, several readers believed that the artist depicted in the story was Sakuliu Pavavaljung. Days after Kuo's Facebook post, engineer Yu Yue-lien disclosed on the same social media network that Sakuliu Pavavaljung had tried to sexually assault her in 2006. Subsequently, an investigation into Sakuliu Pavavaljung began in December 2021. Soon after Sakuliu Pavavaljung had publicly denied the claims of sexual assault, Taipei City Councillor Huang Yu-fen attended a news conference alongside the teenager's lawyer, and accused Sakuliu Pavavalung's partner of coercing the teenager to agree to a legal settlement and remain silent. In January 2022, the Taipei Fine Arts Museum, organizers of the Taiwan pavilion at the 59th Venice Biennale, announced that Sakuliu Pavavaljung would no longer be participating at the event. documenta also announced Sakuliu Pavavaljung's suspension. An investigation into Sakuliu Pavavaljung continued throughout 2022, and culminated in September of that year with an indictment on charges of offences against sexual autonomy. In 2025, he was found guilty of sexual assault, and the Pingtung District Court sentenced him to a prison term of four years and six months. On 1 April 2026, the Supreme Court dismissed Sakuliu Pavavaljung's appeal, after the High Court had upheld the Pingtung District Court's decision. Later that month, the Ministry of Culture revoked Sakuliu Pavavaljung's National Award for Arts, and asked that he return the prize money.
