= Sheelasha Rajbhandari =

Nepali artist

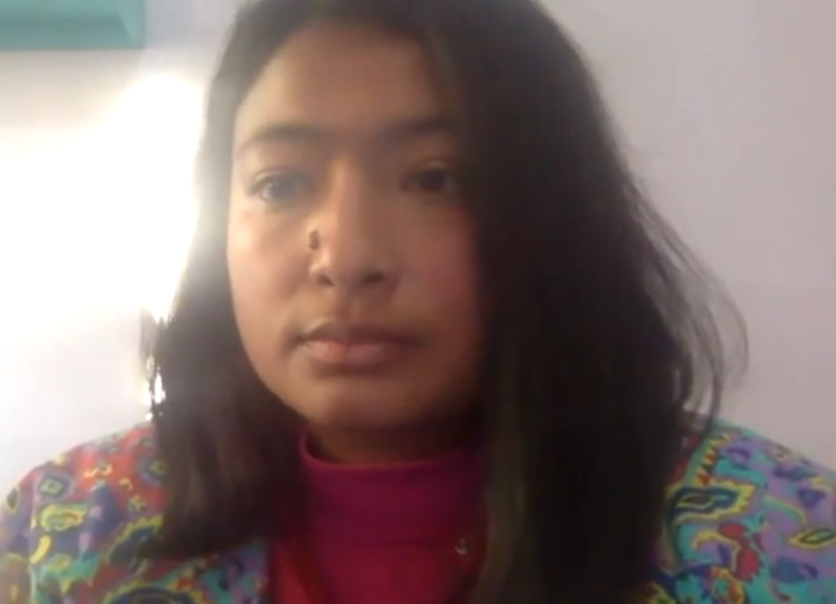
- In a Paul Mellon Centre video in 2024
- Born: 1988 (age 37–38); Kathmandu, Nepal
- Education: Tribuvan University
- Occupations: Artist, curator, cultural organizer

Sheelasha Rajbhandari, (Nepali: शिलाशा राजभण्डारी; born 1988, Kathmandu) is a Nepalese visual artist, curator, and cultural organizer. Her artwork examines alternative narratives through folk tales, oral traditions, myths, material culture, performances and rituals, and presents them as counterpoints to mainstream history and narratives. She often seeks to challenge social taboos and patriarchal discourses by focusing on women's struggles and celebrating their resilience. Her long-term research plans and artistic practice often synthesize knowledge and experiences gained as a result of individual and collective discourses. Rajbhandari is also a curator noted for her contributions to the Kathmandu Triennale 2077 and first Nepal Pavilion, at the 59th International Art Exhibition – La Biennale di Venezia in 2022. In 2013, she co-founded the art collective Artree Nepal alongside Hit Man Gurung, Subas Tamang, Mekh Limbu, and Lavkant Chaudhary.

== Work and career ==
She completed her MFA from Tribuvan University in 2014.

Engaged in women's experiences, Rajbhandari's practice seeks to counter how women's agency and physicality are becoming contested political sites for contemporary nation-states. Her recent works also examine the transformation of Nepal's current transformation from a major center of Himalayan trade to a geopolitical situation between two emerging world powers, India and China.

== Exhibitions ==
Her installation in the traveling exhibition "A beast, a god and a line" (2018–2020) has been presented at Para Site, Hong Kong; TS1, Yangon; Museum of Modern Art, Warsaw; Kunsthall, Trondheim; and MAIIAM Contemporary Art Museum, Chiang Mai. She has also been an artist in residence at the Bellas Artes Projects (2019) and Para Site (2017). She has furthermore exhibited at Museum of Arts and Design, New York (2022), Weltmuseum Wien (2019); Serendipity Arts Festival, Goa (2017); and Kathmandu Triennale (2017). As a part of her collective she has been a part of Dhaka Art Summit (2020) and Biennale of Sydney (2020).

== Collections ==
Rajbhandari's art is represented in private and institutional collections such as

- Kadist
- Samdani Art Foundation
- Weltmuseum Wien
