= Spanish pavilion =

Venice Biennale national pavilion

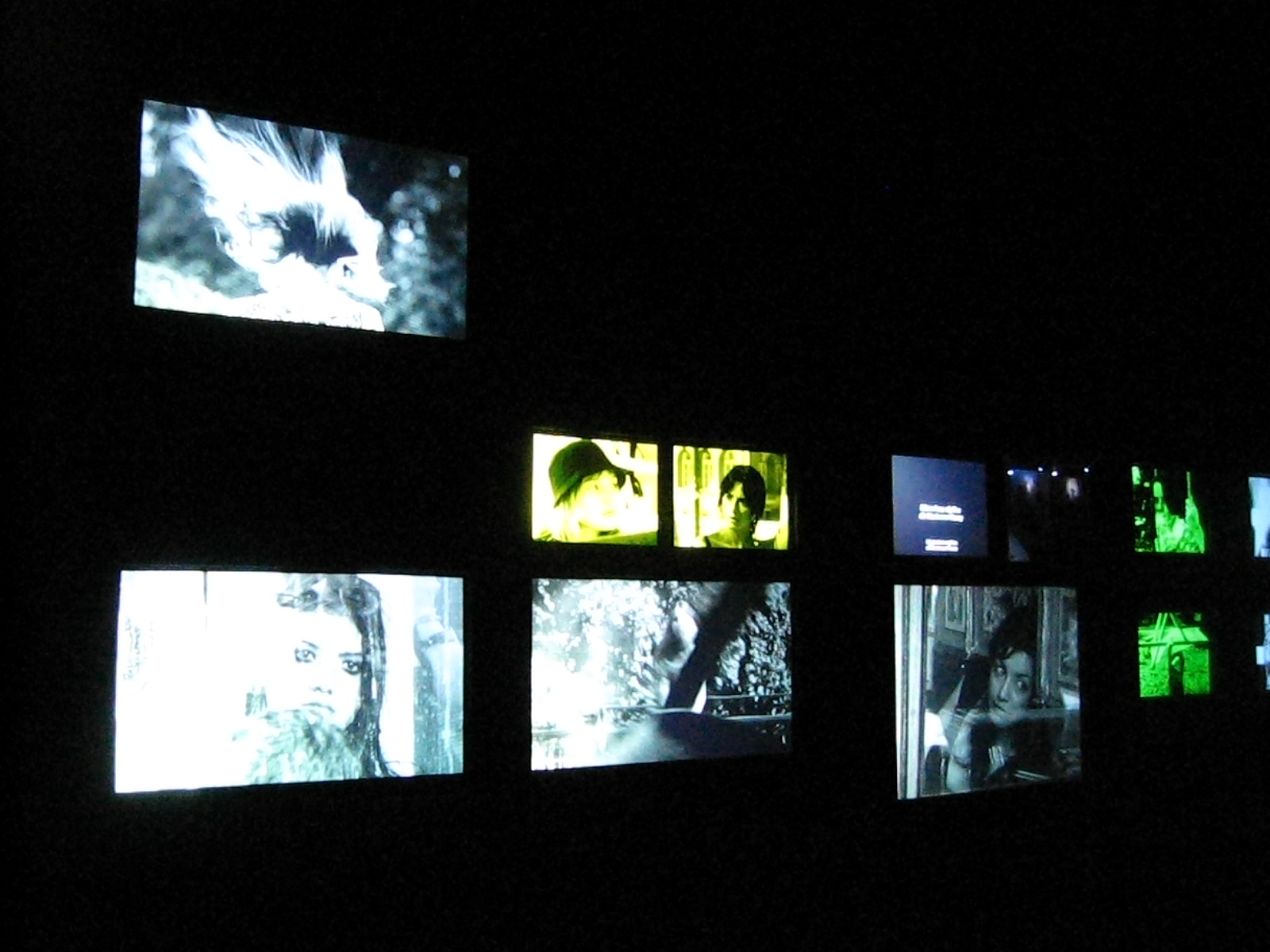
Spanish pavilion, 52nd International Art Exhibition, Venice (542012854)

The Spanish pavilion houses are Spain's national representation during the Venice Biennale arts festivals.

== Background ==
The Venice Biennale is an international art biennial exhibition held in Venice, Italy. Often described as "the Olympics of the art world", participation in the Biennale is a prestigious event for contemporary artists. The festival has become a constellation of shows: a central exhibition curated by that year's artistic director, national pavilions hosted by individual nations, and independent exhibitions held throughout Venice. The Biennale's parent organisation also runs regular festivals in other arts: architecture, dance, film, music and theatre.

Outside the central international exhibition, individual nations produce their own shows, known as pavilions, as their national representation. Nations that own their pavilion buildings – such as the 30 housed in the Giardini – are responsible for their own upkeep and construction costs as well. Nations without dedicated buildings create pavilions in venues throughout the city.

== Organization and building ==
The pavilion was designed and built by Francisco Javier de Luque between 1921 and 1922. While its façade shows influence of 17th century Spanish Baroque architecture, its internal layout is similar to that of the German Pavilion, for a kind of uniformity in the early Giardini buildings. The painter-architect Joaquín Vaquero Palacios restored the pavilion in 1952 and made its façade more modern, with a continuous brick face.

== Representation by year ==
=== Art ===
- 1954 — Miguel Ortiz Berrocal
- 1958 — Eduardo Chillida
- 1970 — Gaston Orellana
- 1984 — Antoni Clavé
- 1988 — Jorge Oteiza, Susana Solano
- 1990 — Antoni Miralda
- 1993 — Antoni Tàpies
- 1999 — Manolo Valdés, Esther Ferrer (Curator: David Pérez)
- 2001 — Ana Laura Aláez, Javier Pérez (Curator: Estrella de Diego)
- 2003 — Santiago Sierra (Curator: Rosa Martínez)
- 2005 — Antoni Muntadas (Curator: Bartomeu Marí)
- 2007 — Manuel Vilariño, José Luis Guerín, "Los Torreznos", Rubén Ramos (Curator: Alberto Ruiz de Samaniego)
- 2009 — Miquel Barceló (Curator: Enrique Juncosa)
- 2011 — Dora García (Curator: Katya García-Antón)
- 2013 — Lara Almarcegui (Curator: Octavio Zaya)
- 2015 — Francesc Ruiz, Pepo Salazar, Cabello/Carceller + Salvador Dalí (Curator: Martí Manen)
- 2017 — Jordi Colomer (Curator: Manuel Segade)
- 2019 — Itziar Okariz, Sergio Prego (Curator: Peio Aguirre)
- 2022 — Ignasi Aballí (Curator: Beatriz Espejo)
- 2024 — Sandra Gamarra (Curator: Agustín Pérez Rubio)

== Bibliography ==
- Russeth, Andrew (April 17, 2019). "The Venice Biennale: Everything You Could Ever Want to Know". ARTnews.
- Volpi, Cristiana (2013). "Spain". In Re Rebaudengo, Adele (ed.). Pavilions and Garden of Venice Biennale. Rome: Contrasto. p. 171. ISBN 978-88-6965-440-4.
