= Bita Razavi =

- Born: 1983 (age 42–43); Tehran, Iran
- Education: Tehran University of Art, Academy of Fine Arts, Helsinki
- Website: bitarazavi.com

Bita Razavi (born 1983) is an Iranian-born contemporary visual artist. She lives between Helsinki, Finland and Mahu, Estonia. Her works, which have been exhibited in various exhibitions worldwide, look into the inner workings of social systems in relation with the political structures and national events of historic proportions in various countries. She works with a broad range of media including video, photography, installation, sound and performance.

== Education ==
Bita Razavi was born in Tehran. She received a BA in Music Performance from the music faculty of Tehran University of Art. She is graduated with an MFA from the Finnish Academy of Fine Arts, Helsinki.

== Career ==
Razavi’s work has been featured in major group exhibitions at the Third New Art Biennial of Tehran (2004), Cité internationale des arts (2012), Videobrasil (2013), National Art Museum of Ukraine (2016), Fotografisk Center, Copenhagen (2018), Latvian National Museum of Art (2019), and Tallinn Art Hall (2019). Her work has been presented in solo exhibitions at the Finnish Institute in Stockholm (2016), Kogo Gallery, Tartu (2019) and Oksasenkatu 11, Helsinki (2019), among others. She has also exhibited her work at the 1st Trondheim Biennale in Norway, Finnish Museum of Photography, XV Biennale de la Méditerranée in Thessaloniki, Helsinki Photography Biennial, Design Museum, Helsinki, Gothenburg International Biennial for Contemporary Art, and Survival Kit 10.0.

Razavi is best known for her autofictional practice and bringing her personal life to her work and to the public. For her graduation project “How to Do Things with Words (A Legal Performance)” (2011) at the Finnish Academy of Fine Arts, she carried out an artistic ceremony, in which she married the artist Jaakko Karhunen in reaction to the rise of a populist right wing party and their proposal for new immigration policies and lowering the funds for contemporary art. The project ended in 2017 with a public divorce ceremony at the Academy of Fine Arts, Helsinki when Razavi received a permanent EU permit for residence. In 2020, Museum of Contemporary Art Kiasma obtained both works in the form of video installations and personal valuables in their collection. In her 2016 work “The Yellow House”, Razavi bought an abandoned house and renovated it for three years to create a place for rest and rehearsing hospitality. In “The Dog Days Will Be Over Soon” (2019), she showed landscape shots from video games in the form of a traditional photography exhibition.

=== Venice Biennale ===
Razavi is selected to represent Estonia at the 59th Venice Biennale in 2022 together with artist Kristina Norman. Their exhibition, titled “Orchidelirium: An Appetite for Abundance”, is curated by the curator of Tallinn Art Hall, Corina Apostol, and will be presented in the Rietveld Pavilion in Giardini, Venice. The project is inspired by Emilie Rosaly Saal’s (1871–1954) works, and investigates the topics of colonialism and its ecological impact.

=== Residencies ===
- ISCP, New York (2017)
- Culture Factory Polymer, Tallinn (2013)
- MoKS, Mooste (2013)
- Nida Art Colony (2011)
- HIAP, Suomenlinna (2011)

== Recognition ==
In 2017, Razavi was the recipient of the Oskar Öflund Foundation’s grand prize.
