= Anders Sunna =

Swedish Sámi artist and activist

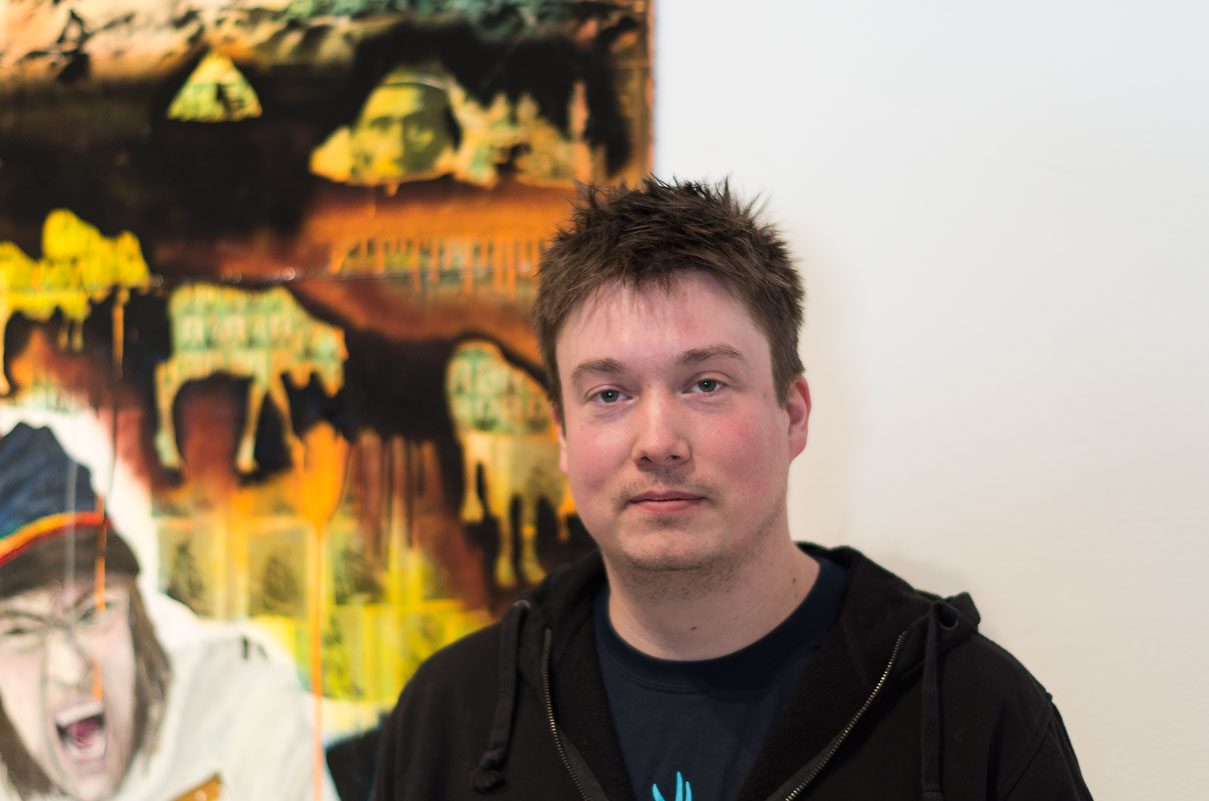
- Anders Sunna at the opening of an exhibition at the Västerbottens Museum in 2016. Partially visible behind him is his painting "Indigenous Love".
- Born: April 11, 1985 (age 40); Kiruna, Norrbotten, Sweden
- Website: anderssunna.com

Börje Karl Anders Sunna (born 11 April 1985) is a Swedish Sámi artist known for incorporating a strong political point of view into his artwork. Sunna was born in the Jukkasjärvi parish of Kiruna, Norrbotten County, Sweden. He grew up in a reindeer herding family in Kieksiäisvaara near the border of Finland and was educated at Academy of Fine Arts, Umeå and the Konstfack University of Arts, Crafts and Design. Nowadays he lives in Jokkmokk, Sweden.

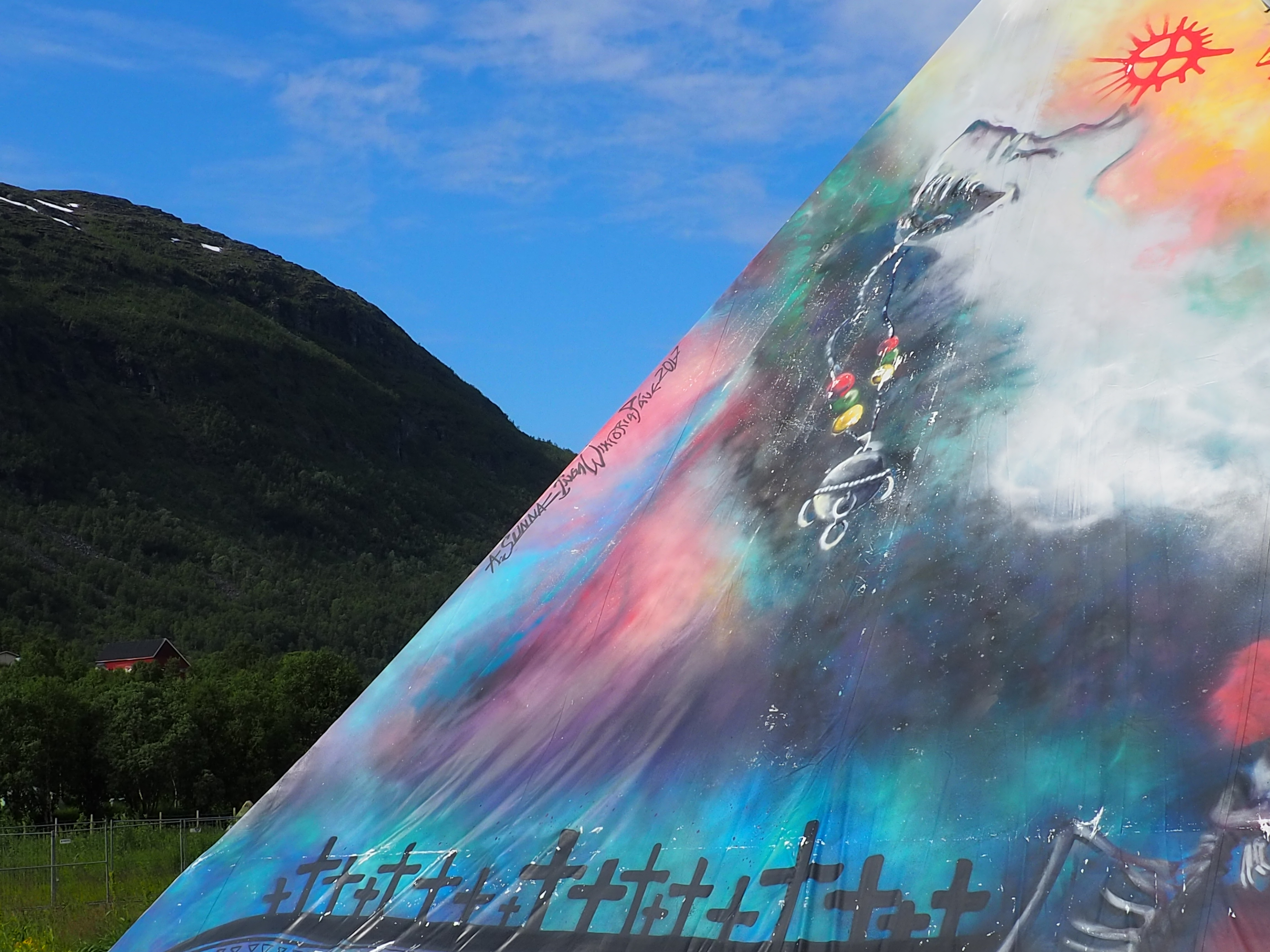
Detail of painting by Inga-Wiktoria Påve and Anders Suuna on a lávvu at the 2017 Riddu Riđđu festival.

Sunna's art is political, often focusing on Sámi history and his family's long-standing conflict with the county administrative board's reindeer husbandry delegation. In his work, Sunna uses thick layers of color, graffiti techniques, collage, and prints with motifs depicting oppression of the Sámi, including forced relocations and photographs from the Swedish State Institute for Racial Biology. In 2013, Sunna drew criticism from some Sámi for his use of the Sámi flag as a canvas for a graffiti-style painting of a skull-faced Sámi man holding an AK-47.

In addition to painting, Sunna works with larger installations. In some exhibitions, he collaborates with the artist and photographer Michiel Brouwer.

Sunna co-directed with Inga-Wiktoria Påve the 2017 animated short film Morit Elena Morit! (Wake Up Elena Wake Up!), which won the Jane Glassco Award for Emerging Talent at the 2017 imagineNATIVE Film and Media Arts Festival in Toronto and Best Indigenous Short Film award at the 2018 Skábmagovat Film Festival in Finland.

Some of Sunna's art is on public display at the Gällivare District courthouse, after being purchased by the Swedish Arts Council in 2015. Sunna is one of the artists representing Sápmi in the Nordic pavilion during the 2022 Venice Biennale.

== Selected exhibitions ==
A partial list of solo and group exhibitions featuring Sunna's work.

- Sámi Pavilion, 59th Venice Biennale, Venice, Italy — 2022
- Varje löv är ett öga with Michiel Brouwer, Göteborgs Konsthall, Gothenburg, Sweden — 2019–2020
- Modernautställningen, Moderna Museet, Stockholm, Sweden — 2018
- Maadtoe with Michiel Brouwer, Kristinehamns konstmuseum, Kristinehamn, Sweden — 2016–2017
- SAAMELAISTA nykytaidetta = Dálá SÁMI dáidda = SÁMI Contemporary travelling exhibition, 7 March 2014 – 27 September 2015
  - Rovaniemi Art Museum, Korundi, Finland — 7 March – 25 May 2014
  - Norrbottens Museum, Luleå, Sweden — 18 June – 24 August 2014
  - Sami Center for Contemporary Art, Karasjok, Norway — 14 November 2014 – 4 January 2015
  - Felleshus, Berlin, Germany — 9 July – 27 September 2015
- Area Infected, Bildmuseet, Umeå, Sweden — 2014
- Institut Tessin, Paris, France — 2014
- Greetings from Sápmi, Jamtli, Östersund, Sweden — 2013
- Norrbottens Ambassad för Konst, Stockholm, Sweden — 2013
- Liljevalchs konsthall, Stockholm, Sweden — 2012
