= Hilde Teerlinck =

Belgian curator

Hilde Teerlinck (born 1966 in Bruges, Belgium) is a Belgian curator, and General Director of the Han Nefkens Foundation, Barcelona.

Hilde Teerlinck was artistic director of the Barcelona Pavilion where she invited artists such as Jeff Wall, Panamarenko, and Dominique Gonzalez-Foerster to create site-specific works for this landmark building.

After a short stay in Perpignan, she went on to become the director of CRAC Alsace, Centre rhénan d'art contemporain in Altkirch in 2002, where she developed a project aiming at opening this institution in the French countryside near Basel to a wider audience. This enabled her to present the work of artists including On Kawara, Rineke Dijkstra, Doug Aitken, Cindy Sherman and Franz West, as well as younger artists, such as Sven t’Jolle, Andro Wekua, and Harmony Korine. At the same time she remained active as an art-critic and a free-lance curator.

Teerlinck has been the director of the Fonds Regional d’Art Contemporain Nord-Pas de Calais (FRAC) in Dunkirk since 2006 . The FRAC Nord-Pas de Calais is a public collection of international contemporary art, containing works of minimal and conceptual art by Bruce Nauman, Dan Flavin, Donald Judd) and Arte Povera, as well as contemporary artists including Rirkrit Tiravanija, Pierre Huyghe, Philippe Parreno, Maurizio Cattelan, Martin Creed and John M. Armleder.

Teerlinck is an executive member of the Board of ArtAids. Together with Han Nefkens, Teerlinck initiated this non-profit foundation in 2004. She was closely involved in Leo Copers’ project for the UNAIDS building in 2006, and organized shows in Barcelona, Lille, Dakar, Vigo, Chiang Mai and Bangkok inviting international artists to create site-specific installations (Danh Vo, Elmgreen & Dragset, Deimantas Narkevicius, Jorge & Lucy Orta, David Goldblatt, Rirkrit Tiravanija, Christodolous Panayiotou, Otto Berchem). Hilde Teerlinck was also member of the board of the Stedelijk Museum voor Actuele Kunst (SMAK) (Ghent, Belgium), Middelheim Museum Antwerp and TRACK (a citywide event taking place in Ghent in 2012).

In 2015, along with Lorenzo Benedetti, Phillip Van Den Boscche, and Patrick Ronse, she co-curated Beyond Borders, the 5th Beaufort Triennial.

Since 2017, Teerlinck has been the CEO- General Director of the Han Nefkens Foundation, a private non-profit organization established in Barcelona by Dutch writer and patron, Han Nefkens. The Foundation aims to promote art and the artistic process and in turn, connect people through art. It focuses solely on video production and the distribution of the work of international artists worldwide.The Video Art Production Grants are tied to several partner institutions that will commit to showing the newly produced work. In this way, the grant offers the artist the chance to forge a dialogue with art professionals from each institution, to show the new work to a large international public in different social, cultural and political contexts. The Foundation has developed a broad contact network of professionals and art institutions, working together with the Fundació Joan Miró, Fundació Antoni Tàpies, MACBA Barcelona, Singapore Art Museum, M+ Hong Kong, Mori Foundation, Tokyo, Bangkok Art and Culture Centre (BACC), Buk Seoul Museum of Art (SeMA), Muhka Antwerp, Bolzano Museum Italy, NTU Centre for Contemporary Art Singapore, Wiels Brussels and MOT Tokyo, amongst others. Teerlinck curated the solo exhibition Giving Voices with recent works by Erkan Özgen at the Antoni Tapies Foundation Barcelona and In Search of Global Poetry for the He Xiangning Art Museum in Shenzhen, China and the CAC Quito, Ecuador.

For the 59th International Art Exhibition 2022, La Biennale di Venezia, the Belgian Pavilion (Flemish Community) invited curator Hilde Teerlinck and artist Francis Alÿs to develop an exhibition project. Alÿs presented The Nature of the Game, an exhibition featuring a group of new short films as well as a selection of paintings, held between April and November 2022.

== Bibliography ==
- Hilde Teerlinck, Patrick Ronse, Paradise. Gids, MER - Borgerhoff & Lamberigts, 2021.
- Hilde Teerlinck, Patrick Ronse, Play: A Tribute to the Homo Ludens, MER - Borgerhoff & Lamberigts, 2018.
- Hilde Teerlinck, Vincent Pecoil, Michele Robecchi, What... Now, CRAC Alsace, 2006.
- Hilde Teerlinck, Stijn Huijts, Robert Fleco, Contemporary Art in the Periphery, CRAC Alsace, 2006.
- Hilde Teerlinck, Jian Qin, Le Printemps de Chine, CRAC Alsace, 2005.
- Hilde Teerlinck, Hilde van Gelder, The Suspended Moment, CRAC Alsace, 2005.
- Hilde Teerlinck, Mirjam Varadinis, Sandra Cattini, Han Nefkens, Cécile Dazord, It is a Small World, CRAC Alsace, 2004.
