= Eva Respini =

Contemporary art curator in the United States

- Born: 1976 (age 48–49)
- Education: Columbia University (BA, MA)
- Occupation: Curator
- Title: Barbara Lee Chief Curator at the Institute of Contemporary Art, Boston

Eva Respini (born 1976) is a curator of contemporary art who served as chief curator (2015–2023) and deputy director for curatorial affairs (2022–2023) at the Institute of Contemporary Art, Boston. She is also a lecturer at Harvard University Graduate School of Design.

== Early life and education ==
Respini was born and raised in Europe, but has lived in the United States for over two decades. Her father is Italian and her mother is Norwegian. She has lived in Croatia (then Yugoslavia), France, Italy, and Switzerland. She received a bachelor's degree in Art History and master's degree in Modern Art and Critical Theory from Columbia University, and was a 2014 fellow at the Center for Curatorial Leadership.

== Career ==
Respini is the Deputy Director for Curatorial Affairs and Barbara Lee Chief Curator at the Institute of Contemporary Art, Boston (ICA), where she has been since 2015. Prior to the ICA, Respini was a curator at the Museum of Modern Art, where she organized contemporary art and photography exhibitions.

At the ICA, Respini has curated solo presentations with artists including Firelei Báez (2021), Deana Lawson (2021), John Akomfrah (2019), Huma Bhabha (2019), and William Forsythe (2018), as well as thematic exhibitions such as When Home Won’t Let You Stay: Migration through Contemporary Art (2019) and Art in the Age of the Internet, 1989 to Today (2018). At the Museum of Modern Art, her noteworthy exhibitions include retrospectives of Walid Raad (2015) and Cindy Sherman (2012).

Respini served as co-commissioner and curator of the U.S. Pavilion's historic Simone Leigh exhibition for the 59th Venice Biennale in 2022. Respini is also working with Leigh on her first museum survey exhibition, scheduled for 2023 at the ICA.

== Other activities ==
In addition to her work as a curator, Respini teaches seminars on curating contemporary art at Harvard University Graduate School of Design. She is the author of many books and catalogues, and contributes magazine and journal articles on the topics of contemporary art and photography.

In 2017, Respini served on the jury for the stand prizes of Frieze Art Fair. In January 2019 she was a Penny Stamps Distinguished Speaker at the University of Michigan.
