= Máret Ánne Sara =

Sami artist and author (born 1983)

Máret Sara
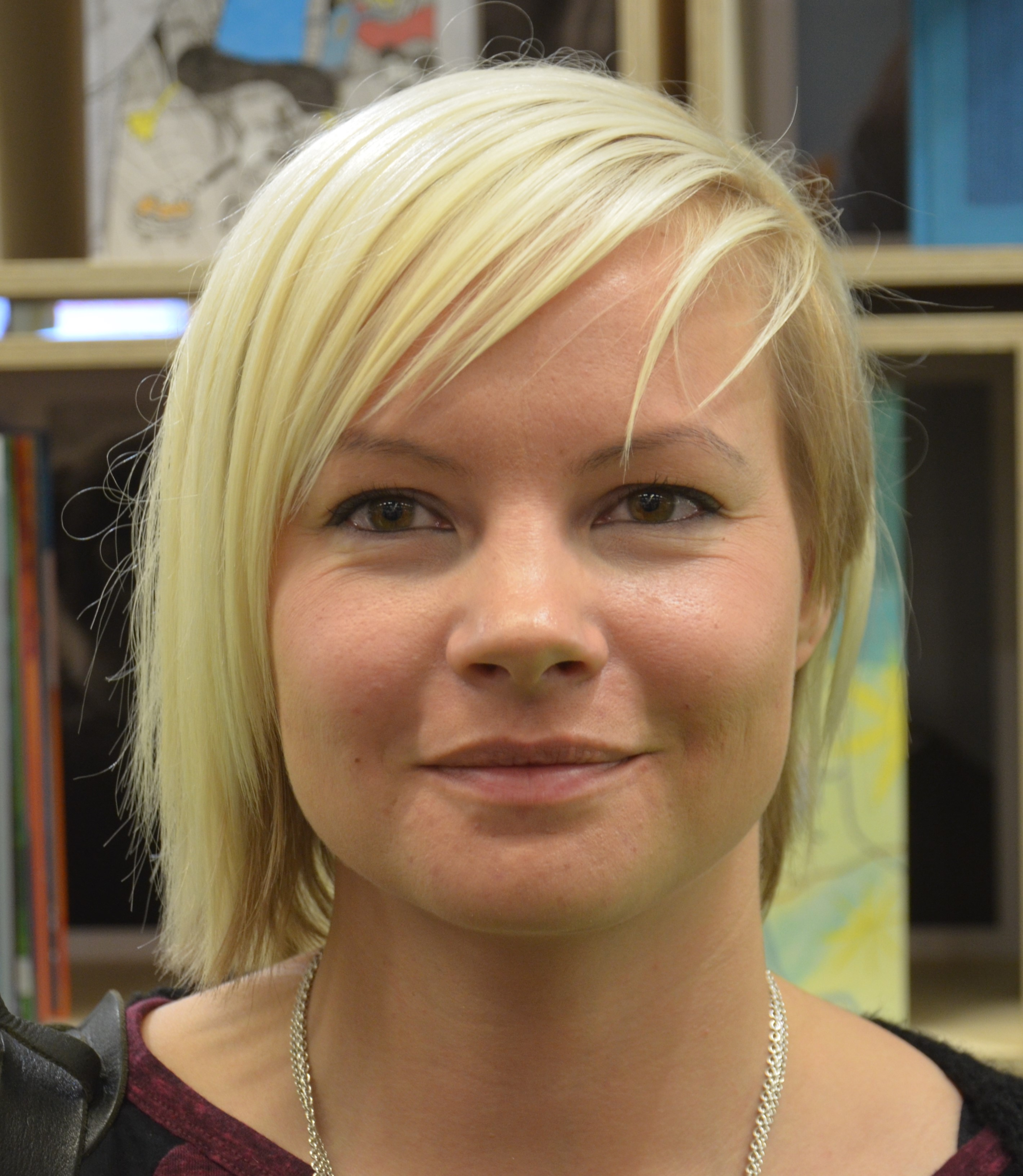
- Sara in 2014
- Born: December 23, 1983 (age 42); Hammerfest, Finnmark, Norway
- Education: Arts University Bournemouth
- Occupations: Artist and author
- Writing career
- Language: Northern Sámi
- Website: maretannesara.com

Máret Ánne Sara (born 23 December 1983) is a Sámi-Norwegian artist and author. Her work explores political and ecological issues affecting the Sámi and Indigenous communities of northern Norway.

== Career ==
Sara's art focuses on Sámi identity and livelihood, specifically as it relates to political and ecological issues as well as reindeer herding. For example, Spirals of the Pile (2018) utilizes reindeer jaws and Gielastuvvon (2018) uses lassos.

She made international headlines in 2016 with Pile o' Sápmi Supreme, a site-specific installation of containing a pile of 200 bullet-pierced reindeer skulls that had been frozen and were bloodstained. A Norwegian flag was then placed atop. The piece was displayed outside the Norwegian Parliament in defiance of government culling policies that many believed would lead to the loss of indigenous culture and way of life. A version of the work was later included in documenta 14 in 2017.

Sara's work was shown at the Sámi Pavilion during the 59th International Art Exhibition of the 2022 Venice Biennial. Included pieces were Gutted – Gávogálši (2022) which uses reindeer stomachs, Ale suova sielu sáiget (2022), which uses cured reindeer calves and tundra plants, and Du-ššan-ahttanu-ššan, which uses reindeer sinew. Gutted – Gávogálši was bought by the National Museum of Norway later that year.

Also in 2022 Pile O'Sapmi was installed in the vestibule of the newly opened National Museum in Oslo. Additionally, Sara was part of the Arctic/Amazon show at the Power Plant gallery in Toronto, Canada.

Sara received the Hyundai Commission in March 2025 to show her work in Tate Modern's Turbine Hall from October 2025 to April 2026. She created spiral wooden fences. The installation was criticised for being too slight for such a huge place.

In 2014, Sara founded Dáiddadállu, a multimedia art organization and movement that seeks to bring artists together to explore Sámi culture and encourage a stronger art presence in Sápmi.

== Art ==
Sara has created a variety of artistic works, including collages, drawings, and mixed pieces. She is most famous for her sculptures, which often depict or utilize reindeer and reindeer body parts such as skulls. The most well-known example of such a work was the Pile o'Sápmi (2016) outside the Indre Finnmark District Court, and later the Norwegian Parliament, protesting Norway's reindeer policies. Such works represent the importance of reindeer to the Sámi culture and way of life, and they protest centuries of repressive and assimilatory efforts against the Sámi people. Through her art pieces, Sara reasserts Sámi values and identity in addition to speaking out on ecological devastation.

In addition to her visual artworks, Sara has also written novels in Northern Sámi. One such book, Ilmmiid gaskkas, is a young adult novel featuring Sámi characters and mythology. Like Sara's visual works, her novels explore Sámi identity and culture in modern times.

== Works ==
- Ilmmiid gaskkas (Between Worlds), young adult fantasy novel, Kautokeino, Norway: DAT, 2013
- Doaresbealde doali, young adult fantasy novel, Kautokeino, Norway: DAT, 2014

== Exhibitions ==
=== Solo Exhibitions ===
Sources:

- 2006: Sámi Siida Museum; Inari, Finland
- 2016: Pile o' Sápmi; Tana Bru
- 2025: Hyundai Commission; Tate Modern's Turbine Hall, London, United Kingdom

=== Group Exhibitions ===
Sources:

- 2017: documenta 14; Kassel, Germany
- 2022: Sámi Pavilion, 59th International Art Exhibition; Venice, Italy

== Awards ==
She was nominated for the Nordic Council Children and Young People's Literature Prize in 2014 for her Sámi-language young adult fantasy novel Ilmmiid gaskkas (Between Worlds).

== Personal life ==
Sara was born in the Hammerfest Municipality, growing up in Finnmark county in a reindeer herding family that had its summer pasture on Kvaløya.

She received her arts education from Arts University Bournemouth in the United Kingdom.

She lives and works in Kautokeino Municipality.
