= Lumturi Blloshmi =

Albanian painter

- Born: 1944; Tirana, Albania
- Died: 2020 (aged 75–76); Tirana, Albania
- Education: Academy of Fine Arts, Tirana, Albania, 1968
- Known for: painter, performance artist
- Awards: Muslim Mulliqi Prize National Gallery of Kosovo, 2007; Onufri, National Museum of Fine Arts (Albania), 1997

Lumturi Blloshmi (1944 - 2020) was an Albanian painter, photographer, installation and performance artist.

== Background ==
Born in Tirana in 1944 she graduated in 1968 from the Academy of Fine Arts in her native Albania, in a period during which Arts where somehow contested by the Communist Government. She had been working before and after the fall of the Communist Regime in 1990. At first she was a painter, following her studies, but later she had artist experiences also as a photographer, installation artist and performance artist. She was probably the first Albanian artist to incorporate performance on her work. Her work often are presented in series. She died of Covid in 2020. In 2022 the Albanian Pavilion at the 59th Venice Biennale was dedicated to the presentation of her works.

== Themes ==
Her works are strongly influenced by her personal experience and the environment in which she grew up. She was deaf from the age of 5, grew up as an artist in a regime that was critical of artistic performances, often forbidding the expression of art. Also, being a woman in the male-dominated field that the Albanian art scene was during the Communist era highly influenced her work. She always experimented with materials and combinations of media to achieve what she called “a distinct tangible universe". Situated within the boundaries of figurative art, her works is strongly informed by imagination and transformation.

== Solo exhibitions ==
- 2006 Chelsea Art Museum, New York, USA
- 2004 Ambiguity, National Gallery of Arts, Tirana, Albania
- 2003 Menu Kama-Sutra, National Gallery of Arts, Tirana, Albania
- 2002 Face-Identity Mirror of the Balkans, Kraljevo, Serbia
- 2001 Jacques Cartier Gallery, Channy, France
- 1989 National Gallery of Arts, Tirana, Albania
- 2022 Albanian Pavilion, 59th Venice Biennale, Italy

== Awards ==
- 1997 Onufri, National Gallery of Arts, Tirana, Albania
