= Ilit Azoulay =

Israeli photographer (born 1972)

Ilit Azoulay עילית אזולאי
- Born: 1972 (age 53–54); Jaffa, Israel
- Education: 2008-2010 MFA, Bezalel Academy of Art and Design, Tel Aviv; 1994-1998 BFA, Department of Photography, Bezalel Academy of Art and Design, Jerusalem
- Known for: Visual art
- Notable work: Navigating Future Codes, Museum der Moderne, Salzburg, 2024, Queendom, Pavilion of Israel at the 59th Venice Biennale, 2022, Regarding Silences, 2008-16, No Thing Dies, 2014-17 Implicit Manifestation KW Berlin, 2014

Ilit Azoulay (Hebrew: עילית אזולאי; born 1972) is an international artist of Moroccan origins based in Berlin.

== Life and career ==
Azoulay was born in the Jaffa district of Tel Aviv, Israel. Her parents both emigrated from Morocco to Israel in the 1940s and 1950s.

She attended the photography department of Bezalel Academy of Art and Design in Jerusalem where she later went on to teach at. She lives and works in Berlin.

== Work ==
Azoulay received a classical training in photography, but ever since she completed her MFA she has critically confronted the norms of photography imposed by a paradigm, developed in a male-dominated industry, that the medium should capture a decisive moment. On the one hand her post-produced images inscribe the photographic process in duration, while on the other it alters the photographic perspective induced by the use of a single lens. Azoulay is best known for pioneering a photography technique aimed at recomposing an image according to the data issued from a thorough research process.

Her work, Room #8 (2011) is a single post-produced ten-meter long panorama and is composed of thousands of digitally assembled macro photographs. It is no longer possible to assess the position or temporality of the photographer for she vanishes behind the grid.

“.... the grid has become iconic of this tense. It is not the grid of modernism, presented as an image of utopian and autarkic autonomy; nor that of postmodernism, reproduced as both a model and a product of ceaseless mechanical movement; nor that of architecture, structured in scaffolding form; it is not even the common, trivial grid habitually used to instill order. No, for Azoulay’s grid lends itself to communication with any and all of these grids, only so long as it remains utterly committed to the establishment of foreignness and distance between the images of these objects and whoever faces them.”

Perhaps more in affinity with “female” weave craft, Azoulay addresses and critiques the Darwinist notion of progress that undergirds the technicity of photography. She often refers to “the one man in the first daguerreotype who was unknowingly photographed, not only because he did not know Daguerre was pointing his machine at him but simply because the technology was not part of his understanding of the world yet: Daguerre was invisible while gathering information.”

Obviously, today it is hard to find a person who is unaware of the camera’s eye and places that aren’t under its scrutiny. But if we look again at this daguerreotype, it appears that the others, those strolling on the Boulevard du Temple at a normal pace were left out of the image, for their pace was too quick for the chemical solution to record their figure.

“It is precisely who did not make it to the visual realm of immediacy dictated by the technical progress that interest me: ‘undeveloped silver halides’ dwelling in the darkness of the past, under layers of time, years of oblivion. Non-processed data of which the story can only be recovered piece by piece.”

With the help of researchers and witnesses, her work is developed on a textuality functioning as data. Rather than critically addressing the administration of data and its unchallenged technological rendering of images, she often proposes other strategies of data gathering and image rendering. A good example of her exhibition strategy can be found in Shifting Degrees Of Certainty, 2014 that was shown at MoMA’s exhibition, Ocean of Images in 2015. Photographic fragments carefully organized on the wall of the museum each bear a number that when pressed in the provided audio-guide, delivered a story about the particular fragment and how it came about. The viewer was ushered into 85 different stories offering as many paths as the artist traced during her research.

“It does not create objects but rather discloses HOW an object has come about and shows why and how this disclosure gives itself as art. Searching for its objects and researching without end the non-appearing sources of their occurrence, the “double law” of this method invents a wholly other SPHERE where the objects and their histories happen WITHOUT method. As if objects and their histories were happening outside, before and beyond any and all space-time coordinates. As if thus objects and their histories required other performatives irreducible to the spatio-temporal synchronicity and, cast outside this synchronicity, they, the objects and their histories, finally reveal themselves WITHOUT END.”

In Azoulay’s work, no element is simply found, but its origins traced and sensed. None of her work is photography in the straightforward sense of the term. Each element in her highly constructed images, even the most banal looking piece of concrete or dust, is carefully considered and (dis)placed. Her composite and multilayered images allow for a parallax view of several layers across time and space, and are inscribed in the record of a duration.

== Exhibitions ==
=== Selected solo exhibitions ===
2024 Mere Things, Jewish Museum, New York, USA

2024 Stopover, Villa Stuck, Munich, Germany

2022 Queendom, Pavilion of Israel at the 59th Venice Biennale, Venice, Italy

2018 Regarding Silences, CCA – Center for Contemporary Art, Tel Aviv, Israel

2017 No Thing Dies, The Israel Museum, Jerusalem, Israel

2017 Nebraska: Unknown Aspects, Braverman Gallery, Tel Aviv, Israel

2015 A 7th option, Andrea Meislin Gallery, New York, USA

2014 A Circumscribed Sphere, Herzliya Museum of Contemporary Art, Israel

2014 Shifting Degrees of Certainty, Kunst Werke Institute for Contemporary Art, Berlin, Germany

2013 Linguistic Turn, Braverman Gallery, Tel Aviv, Israel

2013 Room #8, Andrea Meislin Gallery, New York

2011 The Keys, Andrea Meislin Gallery, New York, USA

2010 The Keys, Bezalel Academy of Arts and Design (MFA), Tel Aviv, Israel

2006 I Placed a Jar, Dollinger Art Project, Tel Aviv, Israel

=== Selected group exhibitions ===
2020 31: Women, Daimler Contemporary, Berlin, Germany

2019 Skɪz(ə)m, PLATO Ostrava, Ostrava, Czech Republic

2019 Transferumbau: Liebling, Liebling Haus – White City Center, Tel Aviv, Israel

2019 Transferumbau, Bauhaus Museum Dessau, Germany

2018 The Big Picture, The Nelson-Atkins Museum of Art, Kansas City, USA

2018 KEDEM–KODEM–KADIMA, CCA Center for Contemporary Art, Tel Aviv, Israel

2018 No Place Like Home, Museu Coleção Berardo, Lisbon, Portugal

2016 Photography Today: Distant Realities, Pinakothek der Moderne, Munich, Germany

2015-17 Disorder, Prix Pictet Cycle Exhibition, Musée d’Art Moderne de la Ville de Paris, France; Museum of Photographic Arts, San Diego, California, USA; MAXXI Museum, Rome, Italy; LUMA Westbau, Zurich, Switzerland; The International Red Cross and Red Crescent Museum, Geneva, Switzerland; CAB Art Center, Brussels, Belgium; The Municipal Gallery of Athens, Greece

2015 The Biography of Things, Australian Centre for Contemporary Art, Melbourne, Australia

2015 Ocean of Images: New Photography 2015, MoMA, New York, USA

2015 Affinity Atlas, The Frances Young Teaching Museum and Art Gallery, Skidmore College, Saratoga Springs, NY, USA

2015 [7] Places [7] Precarious Fields, Fotofestival, Mannheim, Germany

2014 Les Rencontres d’Arles Prix Découverte 2014, Arles, France

2012 Tree For Two One, Contact Photography Festival (public installation), Museum of Canadian Contemporary Art, Toronto, Canada

2011 The Constantiner Photography Award for an Israeli Artist, Tel Aviv Museum of Art, Israel

2011 Magic Lantern: Recent Acquisitions in Contemporary Art, Israel Museum of Art, Jerusalem, Israel

2011 Numerator and Denominator, Herzliya Museum, Herzliya, Israel, 2011

2008 Art Harvest, Art Farm Residency, Nebraska, USA

== Awards ==
2017 Israeli Culture and Sports Ministry Prize (finalist)

2015 The Prix Pictet Global Award in Photography and Sustainability (finalist)

2013 Mifal HaPais Award for Arts and Culture

2011 Israeli Culture and Sports Ministry Prize

2011 The Constantiner Photography Award for an Israeli Artist, Tel Aviv Museum of Art

2010 Gerald Levy Prize for a Young Photographer, The Israel Museum, Jerusalem

2008 America-Israel Cultural Foundation Prize

== Selected collections ==
Centre Pompidou, Paris, France

Daimler Art Collection

Guggenheim Museum, New York, USA

LACMA, Los Angeles, USA

National Gallery of Australia, Sydney, Australia

The Herzliya Museum of Contemporary Art, Israel

The Israel Museum, Jerusalem, Israel

The MoMA – Museum of Modern Art, New York, USA

The Museum of Fine Arts, Houston, USA

The Tel Aviv Museum of Art, Israel

== Teaching ==
Azoulay has taught and lectured in various art schools and academies.

== Publications ==
Ilit Azoulay: Shifting Degrees of Certainty / KW Pocket, ed. Adela Yawitz, pub. by KW Berlin, 2014.

Ilit Azoulay: Finally Without End, ed. by Orit Bulgaru, Sternberg Press, Berlin, 2014.

Ilit Azoulay: A 7th Option, ed. by Jonathan Touitou, pub. by Andrea Meislin Gallery, New York, 2015.

Ilit Azoulay: No Thing Dies, ed. by Maurin Dietrich, Mousse Publishing, Milan, 2019.

== Notable works ==
Regarding Silences, 2008–16

No Thing Dies, 2014–17

Implicit Manifestation, 2014
