= Angela Su =

Hong Kong artist

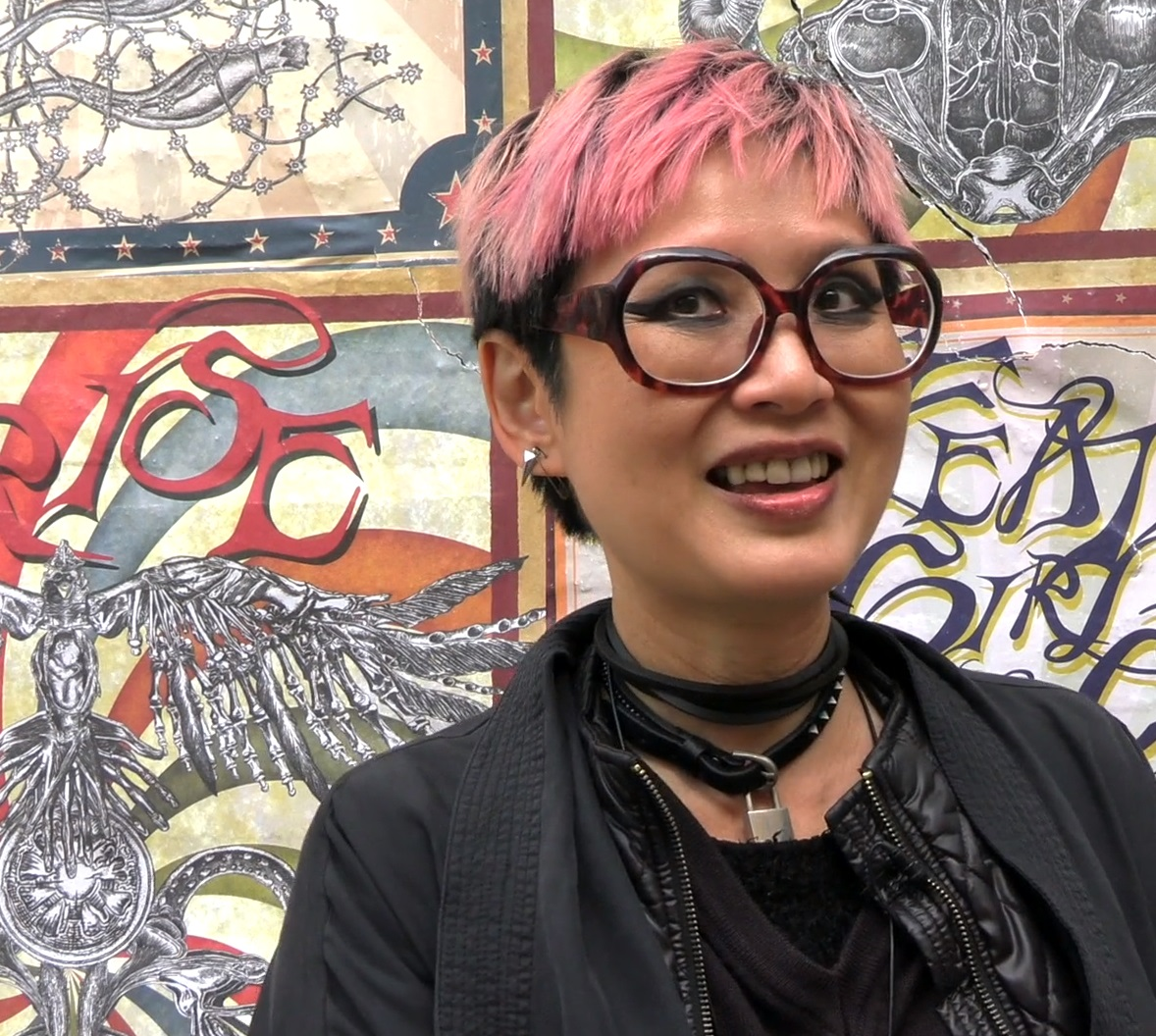
Angela Su 2022

Angela Su is a Hong Kong artist known for her biomorphic drawings, fictional films and hair embroideries, exploring the imagery of the body through metamorphosis, hybridity and transformation. She is a trained biochemist as well as a visual artist. In 2014, Su was featured in Art Radar on a list of influential Asian female artists making an impact on the international art stage. She represents Hong Kong in the Collateral Event at the 59th International Art Exhibition - La Biennale di Venezia, with a solo exhibition titled: Angela Su: Arise, Hong Kong in Venice.

== Biography ==
Angela Su was born in 1958 in Hong Kong. She graduated from the University of Toronto with a degree in biochemistry in 1990 and from the Ontario College of Art with a visual arts degree in 1994. Her works have been exhibited in the Second CAFAM Biennale, the 17th Biennale of Sydney, at the Saatchi Gallery and the Whitechapel Gallery in London. She published an artist novel called Berty in 2013, and a science fiction anthology Dark Fluid, where she used science fiction as a tool for social justice.

== Selected works ==
=== The Magnificent Levitation Act of Lauren O (2022) ===
The Magnificent Levitation Act of Lauren O is a fifteen-minute long pseudo-documentary that presents the story of Su's fictional character, Lauren O, who believes she can levitate, and her involvement with Laden Raven, an activist group catalyzed by the US anti-war movement of the 1960s. The inspirations for the character came from Lauren Olamina, the protagonist from novel Parable of the Sower (1993) by Octavia Butler, together with the feminist activist Bertha Pappenheim.

=== Mesures et Démesures (2015) ===
Mesures et Démesures is a six-minute video that begins with images of flowers with a background soundtrack of a regular tapping sound. It consists of pictures of late-19th century psychiatrists, Jean-Martin Charcot, and the tests that he conducted on a patient who suffered from hysteria, a socially constructed disease that led to misuses of medical care and unjustified discrimination.

=== Hong Kong Bestiary (2015) ===
The exhibition contains various animals' paintings and focuses on the relationship between humans and animals. Although humans consider animals as living creatures, there are characteristics that define a human and animal differently, but there are resemble between the two. In the exhibition, it is portrayed that the human starts to take advantage of the animals. They intentionally use of the animals' image to solve social, moral, environmental and political issues since the animals cannot speak and fight back. The artworks aim to bring out the underlying thoughts of the animals and let the animals speak to the human.

=== Methods of Art (2015) ===
Methods of Art is a one-minute video that was created in response to an artist interview conducted by curator Johannes Hedinger for his project Methods of Art (MoA), an international video archive of artist interviews initiated in 2013 in Germany. At the beginning of the video, Su is caught into a hut by a man. Then it starts broadcasting a speech recorded by Su, in which she apologizes for wasting the audience's time to watch her video and her meaningless artworks, which has a lack of wit, absurdity, humor and urgency.

=== Hartford Girl and other stories (2014) ===
"Hartford Girl and other stories" is a combination of an 11 minute 35 second video and six photographic prints. The work is a multilayered narrative documenting the process of creating the complex, inkless tattoo, composed of 39 lines or "slashes" of text, written freehand on the artist's back. The tattoo refers to the biblical account of the number of lashes received by Jesus prior to his crucifixion. "The Hartford Girl and Other Stories", Su further probes this subject of the experience felt by the human body. This video uses both in the video voiceover and in the text inscribed in the tattoo to be the word's narrative. For the tattoo, those are some prayers that are never completely legible to the audience, indicate an abstraction of the veiled search for forgiveness and recovery. About the video narration, it can clarify the feeling of Hartford Girl and descript the fictional character, random fact, newspaper's report, lyrics and actual self-harmers' testimonies.

If the two main property of tattoo are taken away, then the tattoo is no longer for permanent and decorative. There leaving only painful. "Hartford Girl and other stories" further probes this theme of feeling perception of human body. Also, it focuses on the self-mutilation carried out in present culture, and the complicate meaning that exist inside the mental and the body.

=== In Berty We Trust! (2013) ===
In her show, Su focuses on a theme of sadomasochism. Su's presented her artworks with animation, ink on drafting film and a book related to a machine named Berty. It was a new illustrated book presented with a set of drawings and a video animation of machine-body hybrids. It told a story of a factory worker who became a serial killer, was raped by a machine and gave birth to an abnormal child. The idea is about the extreme effects caused by over-dependence on technology. The book included Su's drawings, a postscript by the artist Nadim Abbas and an 18,000-word novella created by her Asia Art Archive colleague Mary Lee.

=== BwO (2011) ===
BwO, or Body without Organs is an idea introduced by Gilles Deleuze to describe a virtual body without stable structures. In her drawings, Su used the concept of pain to influence our organic sensory and to break down the establishment so as to demonstrate the state of "dis-organization". She described the body in an extremely meticulous way, even blood and anatomies were included in her drawing. Su hoped to express her thinking on pleasure in pain by presenting her painful objects and human organs abreast. The contradiction between the painting and the hidden meaning of the drawings challenged the audiences' aesthetic standards, sense of beauty, and underlying desire.

Since 2010, Su has begun adding anatomical components and fantastical instruments into her art series. The artworks were first exhibited at a solo show at Grotto Fine Art in 2011. Simple tools were the main theme of the show. The group of work was combines into a series of machine. At first, Su has started to draw a tool which was a scissor. Then, the drawings have been transformed into some complicated machines. At the end, an assembly line appeared.

The idea of the assembly line was presented in a form of animation which was shown in a dark room at the exhibition. The sound of the work was trying to deliver the concept of "endless torture" and hint the audiences about one of Su's favorite films by creating a mood that was similar to David Lynch's Eraserhead. In the collection, torture machines, human flesh, apparatus are organs were shown. The artworks were exhibited in topographical perspective in order to make them look like the pages in an old textbook. All drawings were in single black ink and pastel on the drafting film.

=== One woman apartment (2008) ===
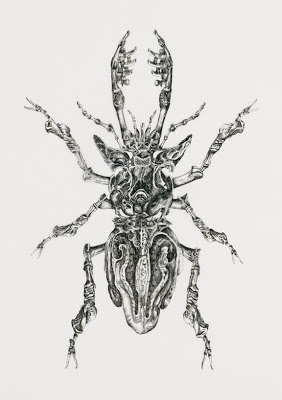
lucanus hermani delisle, ink on drafting film, 60cm x 84cm

It is a failed project that was due to take place in 2008 but Su abandoned it to volunteer with an NGO.

=== Paracelsus' Garden (2008) ===
The exhibition consisted of ink drawings and embroideries. For the ink drawings, Su showed her thoughts on the human skeleton in raw anatomical renderings. Her embroideries were presented with juxtaposition and design. Su brought dreams and alchemy together to form a mysterious vision of nature and the human existence. Su combined her biological background with compositions in putting elements of alchemical and fantasy nature together. Her collection contained flowers, insects, and human figure. They aimed to present a personal response to the symbolic, iconic and figural self.

=== Fascinations (2005) ===
This exhibition was a collaborative work created by four artists, Suki Chan, Melanie Jackson, Leung Meeping and Angela Su. The artwork inquires ideas of collective memory, migration, labor, or race. The main idea of the project reflects to the definition of "fascination". All four artworks records indistinct or personal narratives through different mediums which included fabric, film, video, photography and sound to investigate a scope of human interactions or contentions.

=== Microviolence (2003) ===
In April 2003, during the SARS outbreak in Hong Kong, a woman dialed the major Chinese organizations in Toronto and proposed a comment to blame the local Chinese. She thought they have lived like rats and eaten like pigs, and the dirty disease was spread by them.

In order to trigger the discussion about this kind of racial discrimination, Su took the original statement made by that woman and presented each letter within the sentence as bacteria cultures. The artwork does not reveal whether it agrees with the discrimination to the Chinese or not. It provides rooms of imagination and judgement to the audiences.

=== De Humani Corporis Fabrica (2002) ===
- Booth: Goethe-Institute Hong Kong, Hong Kong

De Humani Corporis Fabrica was a series with seven books written by Andreas Vesalius. It was first published in 1543. He precisely illustrated different parts of the human body which then facilitated the development of scientific anatomy. With the same title, the exhibition proposed to explain the human body by combining the scientific expression with artistic representation. In the art show, science and visual art are combined together to produce new images about the symbolic comprehension of the body.

== Exhibitions ==
Year	Exhibition	Location	Type
2024	Angela Su: Melencolia	Wallach Art Gallery, New York	Solo
2023	Angela Su proudly presents: Lauren O—The Greatest Levitator in the Polyhedric Cosmos of Time	M+, Hong Kong	Solo
2022	Angela Su: Arise, Hong Kong in Venice	the 59th International Art Exhibition – La Biennale di Venezia, Hong Kong Pavilion, Venice, Italy	Solo
2021	So long, thanks again for the fish	Levyhalli, Suomenlinna, Helsinki	Group
2020	Sala10	Museo Universitario Arte Contemporáneo, Mexico	Group
2020	100 Drawings from Now	The Drawing Center, New York	Group
2020	Meditations in an Emergency	Ullens Center for Contemporary Art, Beijing	Group
2019	Contagious Cities: Far Away, Too Close	Tai Kwun, Hong Kong	Group
2019	Woven	Booth: Blindspot Gallery, Frieze London, London, UK	Solo
2019	Artists’ Film International	Whitechapel Gallery, London	Group
2017	The Afterlife of Rosy Leavers	Blindspot Gallery, Hong Kong	Solo
2017	Pro(s)thesis	Academy of Fine Arts Vienna, Austria	Group
2014	The 2nd CAFAM Biennale: The Invisible Hand	CAFA Art Museum, China	Group
2013	In Berty We Trust!	Gallery EXIT, Hong Kong	Solo
2012	Stigmatics – The Hartford Girl and Other Stories	Gallery EXIT, Hong Kong	Solo
2011	A Brief History of Time	RBS Gallery, Malaysia	Solo
2011	BwO	Grotto Fine Art, Hong Kong	Solo
2010	The 17th Biennale of Sydney	Museum of Contemporary Art, Australia	Group
2008	Paracelsus' Garden	Grotto Fine Art, Hong Kong	Solo
2006	Senninbari	Jendala Gallery at the Esplanade, Singapore Fringe Festival, Singapore	Solo
2003	Mircoviolence	Fringe Club, Hong Kong	Solo
2002	De Humani Corporis Fabrica	Goethe-Institut Hong Kong	Solo
