= Pilvi Takala =

Finnish artist

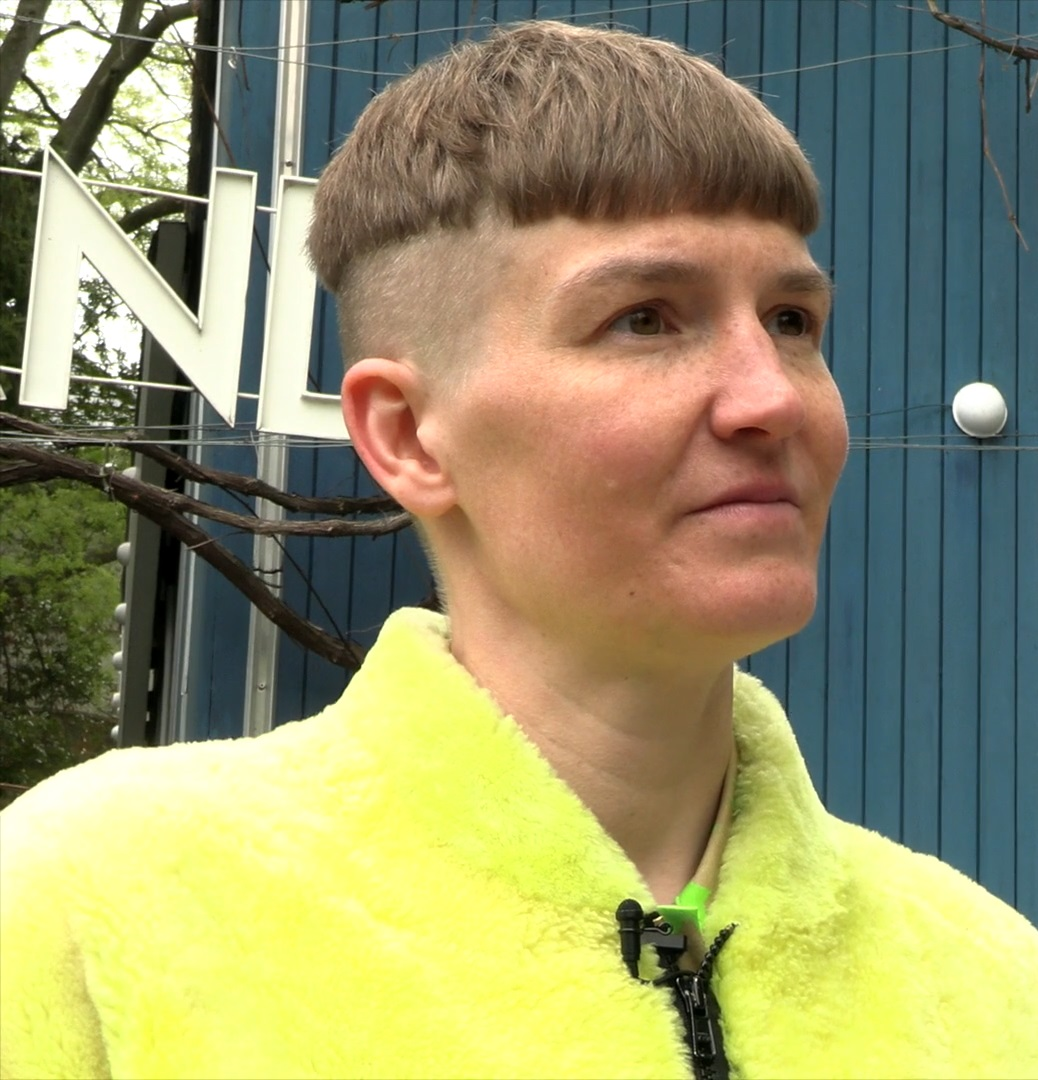
- Pilvi Takala Close Watch – Pavilion of Finland, Venice Biennale, 2022
- Born: 1981 (age 44–45); Helsinki, Finland
- Education: Academy of Fine Arts, Helsinki
- Known for: Time-based media
- Movement: Performance art
- Website: https://pilvitakala.com/

Pilvi Takala (born 1981, Helsinki) is a performance artist presenting candid camera as art. Takala won the Dutch Prix de Rome in 2011 and the Emdash Award in 2013. Her works have been exhibited in various exhibitions worldwide, including London, Aarhus and Glasgow. She is known best for being in time-based media. In 2022, Takala represented Finland in the 59th Venice Biennale.

Takala lives in Helsinki and Berlin.

== Personal life and education ==
Pilvi Takala was born in Helsinki. She was educated at the Institute of Fine Arts from 2000–2001, had Bachelor in Fine Art (2005) and Master of Fine Arts (2006) from the Academy of Fine Arts, Helsinki. In 2004 she spent six months at Glasgow School of Art on an exchange programme.

In the recent years Takala is moving from country to country, having lived and performed in Scotland, the Netherlands and Turkey.

== Career ==
Takala's initial work focuses on interventions in everyday life. She treats her body as an artistic material, using it in different predicaments. By doing this she shows that her feelings are evolving in the course of an intervention to reveal the different expectations of society.

=== Style ===
Takala mixes in her work the reality of documented actions with staged portraiture. Her works clearly show that it is often possible to learn of the implicit rules of a social situation only by its disruption. In her video works based on performative interventions, Takala researches specific communities to explore social structures and questions the normative rules of behavior in different contexts. Her works explore conduct enforced but not necessarily written down or discussed – social unspoken rules that are exposed only when someone like Takala runs counter them.

=== Performances ===
For her early slide show installation and artist's book Bag Lady (2006) she wandered for a week in a Berlin shopping mall with a lot of cash in a transparent plastic bag to observe the reaction of the people around: suspicion from security guards and disdain from shopkeepers.

In another work of her, an installation and video project The Trainee (2008), Takala secretly filmed herself sitting motionless and doing nothing or riding the whole day long in the elevator during her internship in the marketing department at accountancy firm Deloitte. The artwork aimed to shake up everyday life in the office and show other employees’ reactions to Takala's unconventional working methods. Her actions made other coworkers uneasy and resulted in them report HR manager about her behavior.

In Real Snow White (2009) Takala dressed herself as Snow White and attempted to buy a ticket to enter Euro Disney. The video reveals the inability of Euro Disney employees to adequately explain why she can't enter like any other visitor who wants to visit the theme park.

In 2013 Takala won Frieze Foundation Embash Award and established a committee of children aged from 8 to 12 to decide how to spend £7,000 out of £10,000 awarded to her. During the project called The committee she observed kids’ decision making methods through a series of workshops. As a result, the Committee made a decision to create ‘a five-star bouncy castle’. Takala calls her giving money to these kids and the knowledge that children have control and reactions this causes in the world ‘a performative action’.

In the video installation The Stroker (2018) filmed at Second Home, a co-working space in London, Takala moves through the building and greets the members of Second Home gently touching them on the arm or shoulder. These gestures of care and attention subvert established rules of office conduct, provoking some strong reactions such as visible discomfort, nervousness and tension that are reenacted through facial expressions, bodily movements, silence or awkward verbal exchanges.

By touching people Takala probes at the complexities of personal boundaries and individual attitudes toward touch, particularly in the workplace. Her aim is to challenge some kind of boundary in non-aggressive way.

== Work ==
=== Filmography ===
- Amusement Park (2001, short)
- Women in Kahves (2005, instal)
- The Switch (2005, instal)
- Seinäruusu/Wallflower (2006, short)
- Easy Rider (2006, short)
- The Shining Shining (2007, instal)
- Kuuluttaja/The Announcer (2007, short)
- The Angels (2008, short)
- The Messengers (2008, instal)
- Real Snow White (2009, short)
- Players (2010, short)
- Among Others (2001–2010, instal)
- Broad Sense (2012, instal)
- Drive with Care (2014, short)
- The Stroker (2019, short)
- If Your Heart Wants It (Remix) (2020, short)
- Close Watch (2022, instal)

=== Major exhibitions ===
==== Solo exhibitions ====
- 2023 Close Watch, KØS Museum of Art in Public Spaces, Køge
  1. Close Watch, Migros Museum für Gegenwartskunst, Zürich
  2. On Discomfort, Goldsmiths CCA, London
- 2022 Close Watch, Finnish Pavilion, 59th International Art Exhibition – Venice Biennale, Venice
- 2021 Sweat Equity, Krieg, Hasselt (online)
- 2018 Second Shift, Museum of Contemporary Art Kiasma, Helsinki
  1. The Stroker, Carlos/Ishikawa, London
- 2017 The Committee, Pump House Gallery, London
- 2016 Kunsthal Aarhus, Denmark The Centre for Contemporary Arts, Glasgow, Scotland
  1. Workers Forum, YAMA, Istanbul
- 2015 Invisible Friend, Helsinki Contemporary
  1. Give a little bit, Collaboration with Amelie Befeldt, Alkovi, Helsinki The Committee, Stacion – Centre for Contemporary Art, Prishtina, Kosovo
- 2014 Lawyer Of The Week, Futura Centre For Contemporary Art, Prague, Czech Republic
  1. Attires and Attitudes, Tartu Art Museum, Estonia
- 2013 Slight Chance, Bonniers Konsthall, Stockholm, Sweden; Fabra I Coats, Centre D'Art Contemporani, Barcelona, Spain
- 2012 Random Numbers, Carlos/Ishikawa, London, UK
  1. Aside, P74 Gallery, Ljubljana, Slovenia
  2. Breaching Experiments, Site Gallery, Sheffield, UK
  3. Disappearing Act, Galerie Diana Stigter, Amsterdam, the Netherlands (featuring Siri Baggerman)
  4. Suggested Value, Künstlerhaus Bremen, Germany
  5. Just when I thought I was out...they pull me back in, Kunsthalle Erfurt, Germany Broad Sense, Forum Box / Mediaboxi, Helsinki, Finland
- 2011 Sidelines, Sørlandets Kunstmuseum, Kristiansand, Norway
  1. Flip Side, Kunsthalle Lissabon, Portugal
- 2010 You Canʼt Do What You Canʼt Imagine, Finnish-Norwegian Culture Institute, Oslo, Norway
  1. Fear Cure, Inkijk, SKOR, Amsterdam, the Netherlands
  2. Real Snow White, Backspace, Galerie Diana Stigter, Amsterdam, the Netherlands
- 2009 The Trainee, Studio K, Kiasma Museum of Contemporary Art, Helsinki, Finland
  1. Real Snow White, Masa-project, Istanbul, Turkey
  2. The Trainee, Ellen de Bruijne Projects, Amsterdam, the Netherlands
  3. Angels and Messengers, Hiap Project Room, Helsinki, Finland
- 2008 Outshiners, Galerija Miroslav Kraljevic, Zagreb, Croatia
  1. The Angels, Turku Art Museum, Finland
  2. The Trainee, Kiasma Museum of Contemporary Art, Helsinki, Finland
  3. On Volatility with Elmas Deniz, Galeria Noua, Bucharest, Romania
  4. Between Sharing and Caring, FaFa-gallery, Helsinki, Finland; Frac des Pays de La Loire, France
- 2006 Wallflower, Rael Artel Gallery, Pärnu and Tallinn, Estonia

==== Public collections ====
- Espoo Museum of Modern Art EMMA, Espoo, Finland
- Saastamoinen Foundation collection, Finland De Hallen Haarlem, The Netherlands
- Teixera de Freitas’ Collection, Portugal
- Kiasma Museum of Contemporary Art / Finnish National Gallery, Finland
- The State Art Collection, Finland
- Helsinki City Art Museum, Finland
- Helmond Municipal Museum, The Netherlands Amos Anderson Art Museum, Finland
- Henna ja Pertti Niemistö Foundation, Finland

=== Selected publications ===
- 2022 Close Watch, Frame Contemporary Art Finland & Mousse Publishing House
- 2018 Second Shift, Kiasma and Garret Publications, 2018
- 2012 Pilvi Takala: Just when I thought I was out...they pull me back in monograph published by Hatje Cantz, Germany ISBN 978-3775733526
- 2008 Younger Than Jesus Artist Directory, Phaidon and The New Museum, New York 2007 ISBN 978-0714849812
- Pilvi Takala: Between Sharing and Caring, exhibition catalogue, Frac des Pays de La Loire Bag Lady, Istanbul
- 2005 Event on Garnethill, Helsinki
- 2003 Kuvasto, Helsinki

== Awards and nominations ==
- 2013 State Prize for Visual Arts, Finland
- 2013 Emdash Award, Frieze London
- 2013 Akseli Gallen-Kallela Award, Kalevala Society, FI
- 2011 Prix de Rome Visual Arts 1st Prize, The Netherlands
- 2011 Stuttgart Film Winter, Norman Prixe for Best Short Film, DE
- 2010 Kettupäivät Festival, Best Experimental Film
- 2007 Tampere Art Film Festival, 1st Prize
- 2007 Helsinki Short Film Festival, Best Experimental Film, FI
