= Han Nefkens =

Dutch writer and art collector

Han Nefkens (born 1954) is a Dutch writer and art collector. Nefkens purchases and commissions international contemporary art for the specific purpose to give it on long-term loan or donate it to museums.

Born in Rotterdam in 1954, Nefkens studied journalism in France and the United States. He worked as a radio correspondent in Mexico for eleven years. He discovered in 1987 he was HIV-positive.

In 2001 he started the H+F Collection of contemporary art, which consists of photographs, videos, installations and paintings by – among others – Jeff Wall, Sam Taylor-Wood, Bill Viola, Shirin Neshat and Felix Gonzalez-Torres. Nefkens places them on long-term loan to museums in the Netherlands and abroad, including the Centraal Museum in Utrecht, Rotterdam’s Museum Boijmans Van Beuningen and FRAC Nord-Pas de Calais in Dunkirk.

In 2006, Nefkens set up ArtAids, a foundation that uses art in order to increase awareness of HIV/AIDS and improve the lives of people living with HIV.

In addition to being a collector and patron of the arts, Nefkens is also a writer. His first book, Bloedverwanten ("Blood Brothers"; 1995), is a semi-autobiographical novel about two brothers who are both infected with the AIDS virus. This was followed by a collection of short pieces,Twee lege stoelen ("Two Empty Chairs"; 2005). The book De Gevlogen Vogel notities over een herwonnen leven ("Borrowed Time: Notes on a Recovered Life"), which was published in 2008 and has been translated into Spanish, is a report of the lengthy recovery process of Nefkens' HIV induced encephalitis.

"Giving is one of the most underrated values in society", Nefkens says. "By setting up something that I can share with others, I become part of the world. Sharing is the antidote to loneliness, when you share you are not alone."

Nefkens is also the founder of an organisation named after him (Han Nefkens Foundation) and is also a long-time partner with Ilham Gallery of Kuala Lumpur, Malaysia.

== Bibliography ==
Year	Dutch Title	English Title	Editorial
1995	Bloedverwanten	Blood Brothers	Wereldbibliotheek
2005	Twee lege stoelen	Two Empty Chairs	Van der Graff
2008	De Gevlogen Vogel notities over een herwonnen leven	Borrowed Time: Notes on a Recovered Life	Atlas
2011	Han Nefkens. De eerste tien jaar	Han Nefkens. The first ten years	Atlas
