= Polish pavilion =

Venice Biennale national pavilion

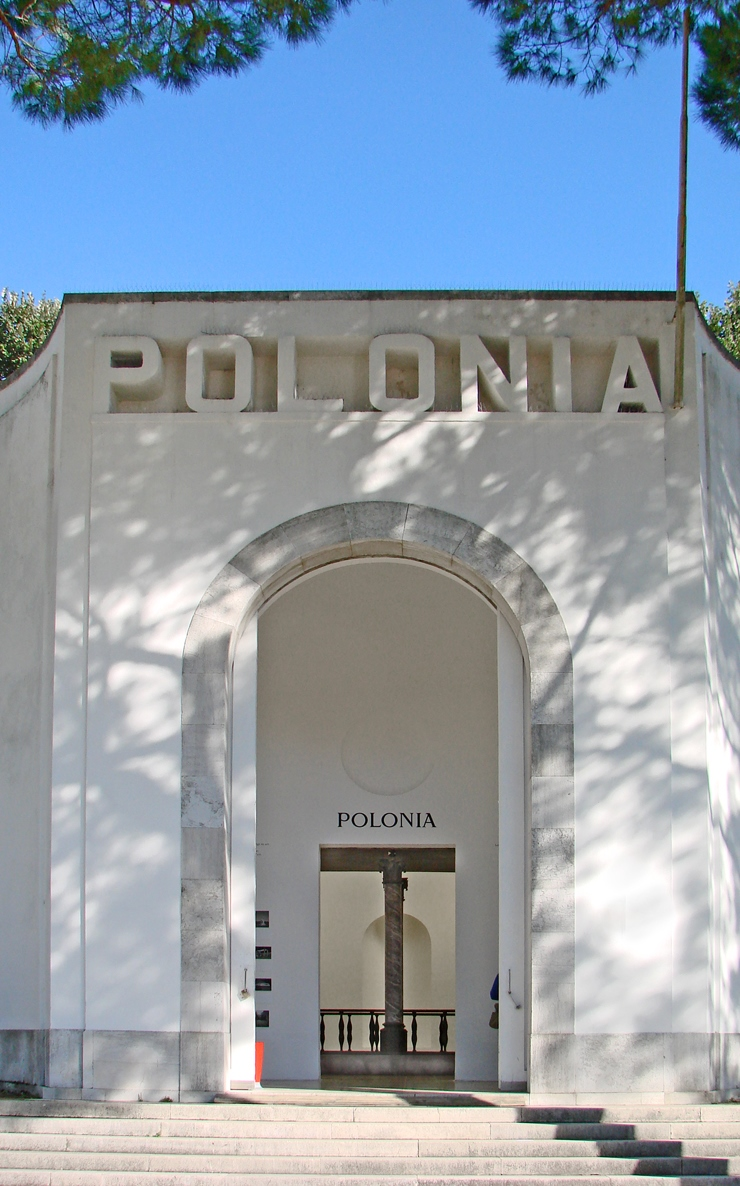
The Polish pavilion's entrance

The Polish pavilion houses Poland's national representation during the Venice Biennale arts festivals.

== Background ==
The Venice Biennale is an international art biennial exhibition held in Venice, Italy. Often described as "the Olympics of the art world", participation in the Biennale is a prestigious event for contemporary artists. The festival has become a constellation of shows: a central exhibition curated by that year's artistic director, national pavilions hosted by individual nations, and independent exhibitions held throughout Venice. The Biennale's parent organisation also runs regular festivals in other arts: architecture, dance, film, music and theatre.

Outside the central international exhibition, individual nations produce their own shows, known as pavilions, as their national representation. Nations that own their pavilion buildings – such as the 30 housed in the Giardini – are responsible for their own upkeep and construction costs as well. Nations without dedicated buildings create pavilions in venues throughout the city.

== Organization and building ==
The pavilion was originally designated for Venetian decorative arts as part of Brenno Del Giudice's Sant'Elena Island complex designed and built in 1932.

== Representation by year ==
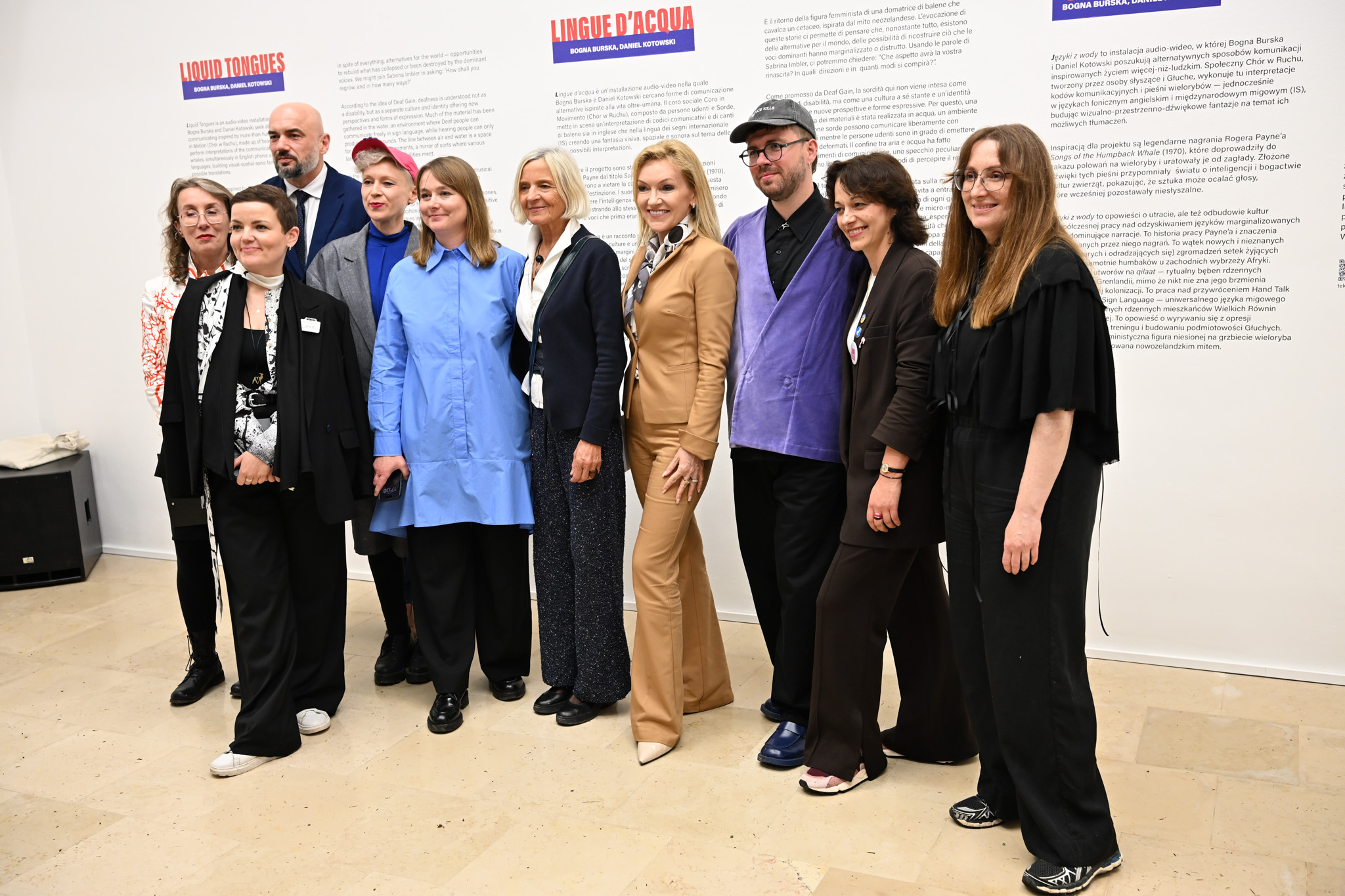
Opening polish pavillon at 61. Biennale di Venezia

=== Art ===
- 1970 — Jozef Szajna, "Reminiscences"
- 1980 — Magdalena Abakanowicz, "Embryology"
- 1993 — Mirosław Bałka, "Soap Corridor"
- 1995 — Roman Opalka
- 1999 — Katarzyna Kozyra, "Men's Bathhouse" (honorary mention)
- 2003 — Stanisław Dróżdż, "ALEA IACTA EST" project (Curator: Paweł Sosnowski)
- 2005 — Artur Żmijewski, " Repetition"
- 2007 — Monika Sosnowska, "1:1" (Curator: Sebastian Cichocki)
- 2009 — Krzysztof Wodiczko, " Guests " (Curator: Bożena Czubak)
- 2011 — Yael Bartana, "And Europe will be stunned" (Curators: Sebastian Cichocki, Galit Eilat)
- 2013 — Konrad Smolenski, "Everything was forever until it was no more" audio installation (Curators: Agnieszka Pindera, Daniel Muzyczuk)
- 2015 — Joanna Malinowska and C. T. Jasper, "Halka/Haiti 18°48’05″N 72°23’01″W"(Curator: Magdalena Moskalewicz)
- 2017 — Sharon Lockhart, "Little Review" (Curator: Barbara Piwowarska)
- 2019 — Roman Stańczak (Curators: Łukasz Mojsak, Łukasz Ronduda)
- 2022 — Małgorzata Mirga-Tas (Curators: Wojciech Szymański and Joanna Warsza)
- 2026 — Bogna Burska und Daniel Kotowski "Liquid Tongues" (Curators: Ewa Chomicka and Jolanta Woszczenko]

=== Architecture ===
- 1991 — (Commissioner: Aleksander Wojciechowski)
- 1996 — (Commissioner: Anda Rottenberg, Curator: Olgierd Czerner)
- 2004 — Architectures: Meta-structures of Humanity, Morphic Strategies of Exposure (Commissioner: Agnieszka Morawińska, Curator: Adam Budak)
- 2006 — Transfer (Commissioner: Agnieszka Morawińska, Curator: Gabriela Świtek)
- 2008 — Hotel Polonia. The Afterlife of Buildings (Commissioner: Agnieszka Morawińska, Curators: Grzegorz Piątek, Jarosław Trybuś)
- 2010 — Emergency Exit (Commissioner: Agnieszka Morawińska, Curator: Elias Redstone)
- 2012 — Making the walls quake as if they were dilating with the secret knowledge of great powers (Commissioner: Hanna Wróblewska, Curator: Michał Libera)
- 2014 — Impossible Objects (Commissioner: Hanna Wróblewska, Curator: Instytut Architektury)
- 2016 — Fair Building (Commissioner: Hanna Wróblewska, Curator: Dominika Janicka)
- 2018 — Amplifying Nature (Commissioner: Hanna Wróblewska, Curator: Anna Ptak)
- 2021 — Trouble in Paradise (Commissioner: Hanna Wróblewska, Curator: PROLOG +1)
- 2023 — Datament (Commissioner: Janusz Janowski, Curator: Jacek Sosnowski)
- 2025 — Lares and Penates: On Building a Sense of Security in Architecture (Commissioner: Agnieszka Pindera, Curator: Aleksandra Kędziorek)

== Bibliography ==
- Russeth, Andrew (April 17, 2019). "The Venice Biennale: Everything You Could Ever Want to Know". ARTnews.
- Volpi, Cristiana (2013). "Poland". In Re Rebaudengo, Adele (ed.). Pavilions and Garden of Venice Biennale. Rome: Contrasto. p. 177. ISBN 978-88-6965-440-4.
