= Sigurður Guðjónsson =

Icelandic contemporary artist (born 1975)

Sigurður Guðjónsson is an Icelandic contemporary artist. He works in the field of installation art and video art.

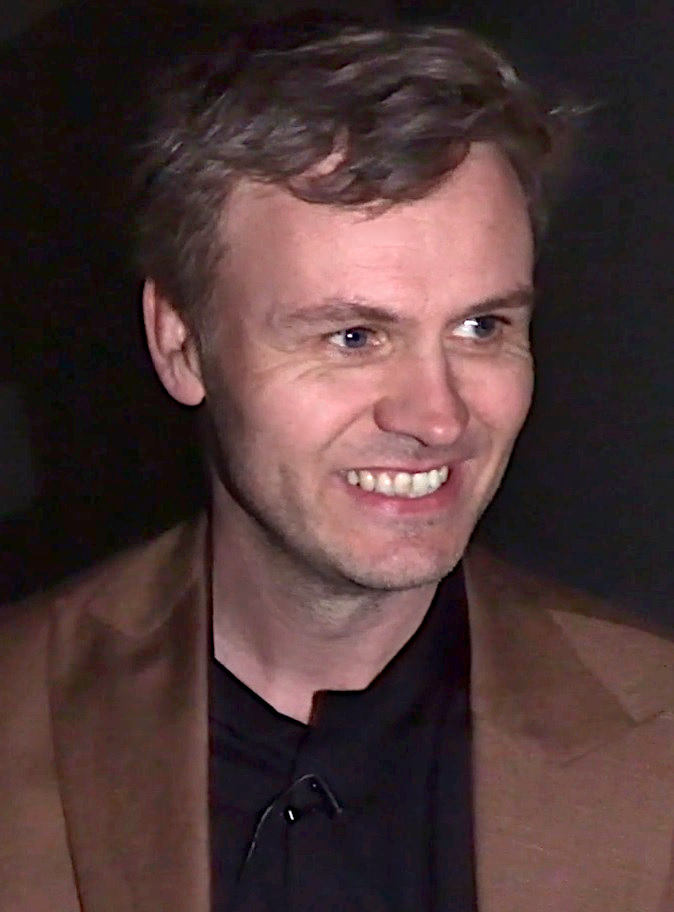
Sigurður Guðjónsson 2022

== Early life and career ==
Sigurður was born in 1975 in Reykjavík, Iceland. He studied art in Reykjavík at the Iceland University of the Arts, graduating in 2003 and in Vienna, at Akademie der Bildenden Künste between the years of 2003-4. He is one of the founding members of death metal band Cranium, an influential force in Reykjavík's underground metal scene in the 1990s.

== Work ==
Sigurður is mostly known for his video works, which carry dark and moody characteristics, as well as complex conceptual ideologies behind them. They often focus on the relationship between man-made infrastructure, technical relics, machinery, juxtaposed against natural objects and their soundscapes. He often works with musical composers and one of his newest works, titled Enigma, is made in collaboration with Anna S. Þorvaldsdóttir. It consists of a string quartet and a video piece and has recently been on tour with four-time Grammy nominees The Spektral Quartet. The work can be described as a small fragment of coal captured through an electron microscope that uses a beam of accelerated electrons as its source of illumination, a materialized projection of a layered moment in time, that mirrors itself through texture. Sigurður Guðjónsson represented Iceland at the 59th International Venice Biennale 2022 with his installation Perpetual Motion. This installation offered a poetic exploration of materiality at the edge of the boundaries of perception, powerfully combining moving images and sound to activate the space and create an entrancing, meditative experience for visitors. The work is staged as a split-screen installation, featuring a 6 metre tall vertical projection that connects to a large-scale floor projection that occupies most of the pavilion’s space, and it was chosen as one of the top five national pavilions in Venice by the Financial Times. Located in the Arsenale, the pavilion was curated by Mónica Bello and it features a soundscape by Sigurður in collaboration with composer and sound technician Valgeir Sigurðsson, known for his collaborations with Björk. It has been further described as "a playground for the imagination, placing the focus on the smallest elements which make up the world", a dreamscape of magnets and metals.

The primary object depicted in the work is, in fact, a small magnetic disc taken from an old loudspeaker, with metal dust sprinkled around the rim. The work depicts the metal dusted rim in extreme close up as it revolves. The outcome is a 45-minute uncut video shown on two screens connected to each other like mirror images, but their playback speeds are different. This is not the first time that Sigurður has played with perception by using mundane objects. For Fluorescent (2021), the artist took a peep into a fluorescent tube and presented a mesmerizing alternative view of the everyday object, exposing a hidden universe made of swirling dust. He also employed an electron microscope to scan a fragment of carbon in Enigma (2019), conjuring an otherworldly image of the material, and made the mysterious poetic space of Lightroom (2018) from an old slide projector. Tape (2016), a particularly important work for the artist, is a close-up study of a cassette tape, another medium that has been largely forgotten in the digital age.

With more than twenty solo exhibitions and dozens of groups shows and festival screenings, his works have been shown to critical acclaim around the world and been exhibited in such institutions as the National Gallery of Iceland, Kennedy Center DC, Scandinavia House NYC, The Royal Society of British Sculptors and Hamburger Bahnhof in Berlin. He has participated in biennales such as the Liverpool Biennale, Vienna Biennale and Njord Biennale in Copenhagen. Sigurður is represented by the art gallery BERG Contemporary. He currently lives and works in Reykjavík.

=== Awards ===
Sigurður was awarded the Icelandic Art Prize as Visual Artist of the Year in 2018, for his 2017 exhibition Inlight. The exhibition featured video installations set within the defunct St. Joseph’s Hospital in Hafnarfjörður, Iceland.

== Publications ==
- Cantz, Hatje. SKULPTUR: The Royal British Society of Sculptors, 2015. ISBN 9783775740432.
- Scacco, Lorella. Northwave: published by Silvana Editoriale, 2009. ISBN 978-3-7757-4043-2.
- Ostfildern, Hatje-Cantz. Icelandic Art Today: ed. by Christian Schoen and Halldór Björn Runólfsson, 2009. ISBN 978-3-7757-3283-3.
- Distanz, SIGURÐUR GUÐJÓNSSON, Perpetual MOTION 59th Venice Biennale, 2022. ISBN 978-3-95476-450-1.
