= Tsherin Sherpa =

Skipper Rising, 2023 sculpture by Tsherin Sherpa

Tsherin Sherpa (born 1968) is a contemporary artist who was born in Kathmandu, Nepal to a Nepalese mother and a Tibetan father, who was a professional thangka painter. At age 12, Tsherin began his training as a thangka painter under the tutelage of his father, Urgen Dorje. He also attended classes in Buddhist scripture, symbolism, and prayer at the Ka-Nying Shedrub Ling monastery on the outskirts of Kathmandu, along with the young monks. When he was age 17, he received a scholarship to study computer science in Taiwan. After three years in Taiwan, he returned to Nepal, where he worked with his father for eight more years.

In 1998, at age 28, he accepted an invitation from a family friend to visit her in Sausalito, California. He found employment at the Buddhist center in Sebastopol, California as a thangka painter and instructor. While living and working in California, he got a green card and eventually became an American citizen.

Many of his paintings and sculptures combine traditional Himalayan Buddhist art with contemporary events and pop culture. His religious figures are often painted with designs created by using Photoshop to distort images of the deity Mahakala. This is illustrated in the artist's sculpture, Skipper Rising. The backgrounds of his paintings often contain many small images, especially butterflies, representing the metamorphosis of his immigrant experience.
