= Patrick D. Flores =

Filipino art curator, critic and historian (b.1969)

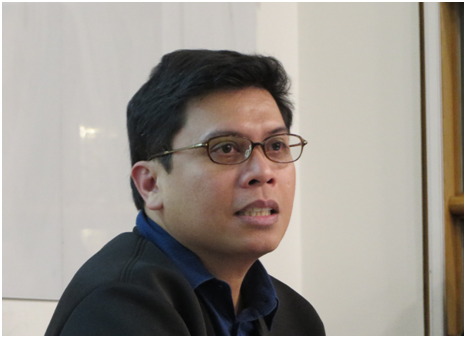
- Patrick Flores (2015)
- Born: 1969 (age 56–57); Iloilo, Philippines
- Occupations: Art curator, critic, professor
- Notable work: Painting History: Revisions in Philippine Colonial Art

Patrick Duarte Flores (Iloilo,1969) is a Filipino curator, critic, and professor. Born in the Philippines, he received degrees in humanities, art history, and Philippine studies at the University of the Philippines Diliman. He is a professor of Art Studies in the Department of Art Studies at the University of the Philippines and curator of the Vargas Museum in Manila. He was also a curator of the Arts Division, Philippine National Museum and curator of the Philippine Pavilion at the Venice Biennale in 2015. He was the artistic director of the 2019 Singapore Biennale.

== Published works ==
- Painting History: Revisions in Philippine Colonial Art (Manila: University of the Philippines Press, 1999)
- Crossings : Philippine works from the Singapore Art Museum (Singapore Art Museum, 2004)
- Remarkable Collection: Art, History, and the National Museum (2006)
- Past Peripheral: Curation in Southeast Asia (NUS Museum/University of Michigan, 2008)
- Forming Lineage: The National Artists for the Visual Arts of the University of the Philippines (Manila: University of the Philippines, 2008)
- The life and art of Botong Francisco (Manila: Vibal Publishing, 2010)
- The life and art of Francisco Coching (Manila: Vibal Publishing, 2010)
- Art After War, 1948-1969 (Manila: Modern Reader, 2015)
- The Philippine Contemporary: Sa Pagitan Ng Mga Landas / To Scale the Past and the Possible (Metropolitan Museum of Manila, 2018)
