= Serbian pavilion =

Venice Biennale national pavilion

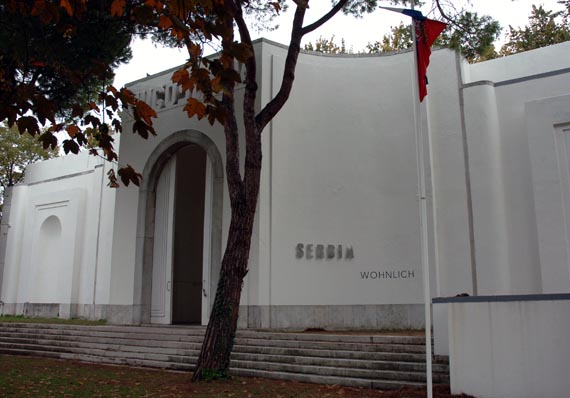
Padiglione Serbia

The Serbian pavilion is a national pavilion of the Venice Biennale arts festivals. It houses Serbia's national representation.

== Background ==
The Venice Biennale is an international art biennial exhibition held in Venice, Italy. Often described as "the Olympics of the art world", participation in the Biennale is a prestigious event for contemporary artists. The festival has become a constellation of shows: a central exhibition curated by that year's artistic director, national pavilions hosted by individual nations, and independent exhibitions held throughout Venice. The Biennale's parent organisation also runs regular festivals in other arts: architecture, dance, film, music and theatre.

Outside the central international exhibition, individual nations produce their own shows, known as pavilions, as their national representation. Nations that own their pavilion buildings – such as the 30 housed in the Giardini – are responsible for their own upkeep and construction costs as well. Nations without dedicated buildings create pavilions in venues throughout the city.

== Organization and building ==
The pavilion was originally designed by Italian architect Brenno Del Giudice in 1932 and built in 1938 as part of a new expansion of the complex on the Giardini's Sant'Elena Island. Two buildings were built next to each other, originally allocated to Sweden and Greece, but were later permanently transferred to Yugoslavia and Romania. The pavilion has the inscription "JUGOSLAVIA" ("Yugoslavia" in Italian) in large block letters above the entrance.

Artists from the former Yugoslavia participated in the Biennale from 1938 to 1990. Following the breakup of the country in the early 1990s, four new countries which declared independence (Bosnia and Herzegovina, Croatia, Macedonia, and Slovenia) began exhibiting separately, and the pavilion was inherited by Serbia and Montenegro (2003 and 2005) and after that by Serbia.

== Representation by year ==
=== Art ===
- 2003 - Milica Tomić (Curators: Branislav Dimitrijević and Dejan Sretenović)
- 2012 — Marija Miković, Marija Strajnić, Olga Lazarević, Janko Tadić, Nebojša Stevanović, Miloš Živković, Aleksandar Ristović, Nikola Andonov, Milan Dragić, and Marko Marović
- 2015 — Ivan Grubanov (Curator: Lidija Merenik)
- 2017 — Milena Dragičević, Vladislav Šćepanović, and Dragan Zdravković (Curator: Nikola Šuica)
- 2022 — Vladimir Nikolić (Curator: Biljana Ćirić)
- 2024 — Aleksandar Denić

== Bibliography ==
- Russeth, Andrew (April 17, 2019). "The Venice Biennale: Everything You Could Ever Want to Know". ARTnews.
- Volpi, Cristiana (2013). "Serbia". In Re Rebaudengo, Adele (ed.). Pavilions and Garden of Venice Biennale. Rome: Contrasto. p. 176. ISBN 978-88-6965-440-4.
