= Maria Eichhorn =

German artist based in Berlin

Maria Eichhorn (born 19 November 1962, in Bamberg) is a German artist based in Berlin. She is best known for site-specific works and installations that investigate political and economic systems, often revealing their intrinsic absurdity or the extent to which we normalize their complex codes and networks. She represented Germany at the 2022 Venice Biennale.

== Background ==
Maria Eichhorn was born in 1962 in Bamberg, Germany. From 1983 to 1990, she lived in Berlin and studied at the Hochschule der Kunste (Berlin University of the Arts) in the class of Karl Horst Hödicke. Since the late 1980s, her work has explored the relationship between the symbolic and the real, between the practice of art and direct actions geared towards positive changes in personal life, social relations and the human and natural environments. She has exhibited since the late 1980s, including shows in Amsterdam, Berlin, Bern, Barcelona, Warsaw, Zurich and Tokyo. She has taught at the School of Art and Design in Zurich since 2003.

== Artistic practice ==
Maria Eichhorn's artistic practice challenges facile categorization. Her work has spanned a variety of genres and media from wall texts to artist books, staged events to interviews, broad-ranging symposia to public billboards, film and video, as well as institutions and provenance research. Works such as "Money at Kunsthalle Bern" (2000) and "5 weeks, 25 days, 175 hours" (2016) explore gallery systems and the structures that enable an exhibition space to function including facilities and working lives of gallery staffs. Eichhorn's ambitious, large-scale projects often take on the mechanics of legal, social and financial processes, making permanent interventions that evolve over time.

== Selected exhibitions ==
- 2023: Reuchlinstraße 4 b, 70178 Stuttgart (2023—), Künstlerhaus Stuttgart, Stuttgart, Germany
- 2022: The German Pavilion at the 59th International Art Exhibition—la Biennale di Venezia, Venice, Italy
- 2018: Zwölf Arbeiten/Twelve Works (1988–2018), Migros Museum für Gegenwartskunst, Zurich, Switzerland
- 2016: 5 weeks, 25 days, 175 hours, Chisenhale Gallery, London, United Kingdom
- 2015: Maria Eichhorn, Belkin Art Gallery, Vancouver, BC, Canada
- 2014: Maria Eichhorn, Kunsthaus Bregenz, Bregenz, Austria
- 2011: Zimmerstraße 88/89, 10117 Berlin, Galerie Barbara Weiss, Berlin, Germany
- 2011: Maria Eichhorn & Asta Gröting, Kunsthal 44 Møen, Askeby, Sweden
- 2009: Maria Eichhorn.Vier Multiples in Tasche, Edition Block, Berlin, Germany
- 2009: Maria Eichhorn. Filmlexikon sexueller Praktiken, Galerie Eva Presenhuber, Zurich, Switzerland
- 2009: Dispersion, Institute of Contemporary Arts, London, United Kingdom
- 2007: Maria Eichhorn Aktiengesellschaft/Maria Eichhorn Public Limited Company, Van Abbemuseum, Eindhoven, Netherlands
- 2007: Maria Eichhorn, Die Anteilscheine der Kunsthalle Bern, Grafische Sammlung, Kunstmuseum Bernb, Bern, Switzerland
- 2006: Films, Vox, œuvre sonore, Centre de l´Image Contemporaine, Montréal, Canada
- 2005: Maria Eichhorn, 27. August – 8. Oktober 2005, Galerie Barbara Weiss, Berlin, Germany
- 2005: Die Anteilscheine der Kunsthalle Bern, Stiftung Kunsthalle Bern, Bern, Switzerland (2005)
- 2004:16 Factures, Centre d'Art Santa Monica, Barcelona, Spain, curated by Ferran Barenblit
- 2004: CAMPUS, Freie Universität, Bozen, Italy (2004)
- 2003: Prohibited Imports, Masataka Hayakawa Gallery, Tokyo, Japan (2003)
- 2002: 23 Kurzfilme / 23 Filmplakate (1995/2002), Galerie Hauser & Wirth & Presenhuber, Zurich, Switzerland (2002)
- 2002: Curtain (yellow), Masataka Hayakawa Gallery, Tokyo, Japan
- 1998: "The Artist's Reserved Rights Transfer and Sale Agreement" by Seth Siegelaub and Bob Projansky, Salzburger Kunstverein, Salzburg, Austria
- 1995: Chair Events von George Brecht / 33 1/3 von John Cage / Flux Ping-Pong von George Maciunas, Galerie Susanne Ottesen, Copenhagen, Denmark
- 1987: Projekt Hollmannstraße, Eckgrundstück Lindenstraße/Hollmannstraße, Berlin, Germany

== Selected publications ==
- Eichhorn, Maria (2009). The Artist's Contract Interviews with Carl Andre, Daniel Buren, Paula Cooper, Hans Haacke, Jenny Holzer, Adrian Piper, Robert Projansky, Robert Ryman, Seth Siegelaub, John Weber, Lawrence Weiner, Jackie Winsor. Köln: Walther König Verlag. ISBN 978-3-86560-421-7.
- Gaensheimer, Susanne (2004). Maria Eichhorn (in German). Köln: König. ISBN 978-3-88375-848-0.
- Eichhorn, Maria; Fietzek, Gerti (1 January 1996). Abbildungen, Interviews, Texte (in German). München: S. Schreiber. ISBN 978-3-88960-037-0.
