= Małgorzata Mirga-Tas =

Polish-Romani artist

- Born: 1978 (age 47–48); Zakopane, Poland
- Education: Jan Matejko Academy of Fine Arts
- Known for: visual arts, painting, sculpture
- Awards: Paszport Polityki (2020)

Małgorzata Mirga-Tas (Polish pronunciation: [mawɡɔˈʐata ˈmirɡa ˈtas]; born 1978) is a Polish-Romani artist, sculptor, painter, activist, feminist and educator, the winner of the Paszport Polityki Polish art award. In 2022 Mirga-Tas represented Poland at the 59th Venice Biennale as part of the "Milk of Dreams" exhibition, where she was the first Romani artist to represent any country at this art event.

== Biography ==
Mirga-Tas was born in 1978 in Zakopane, Poland. She is a member of the Bergitka Roma. She graduated from the Academy of Arts in Krakow in 2004. Mirga-Tas lives and works in Czarna Góra, a Romani village at the foot of the Tatra Mountains.

=== Work ===
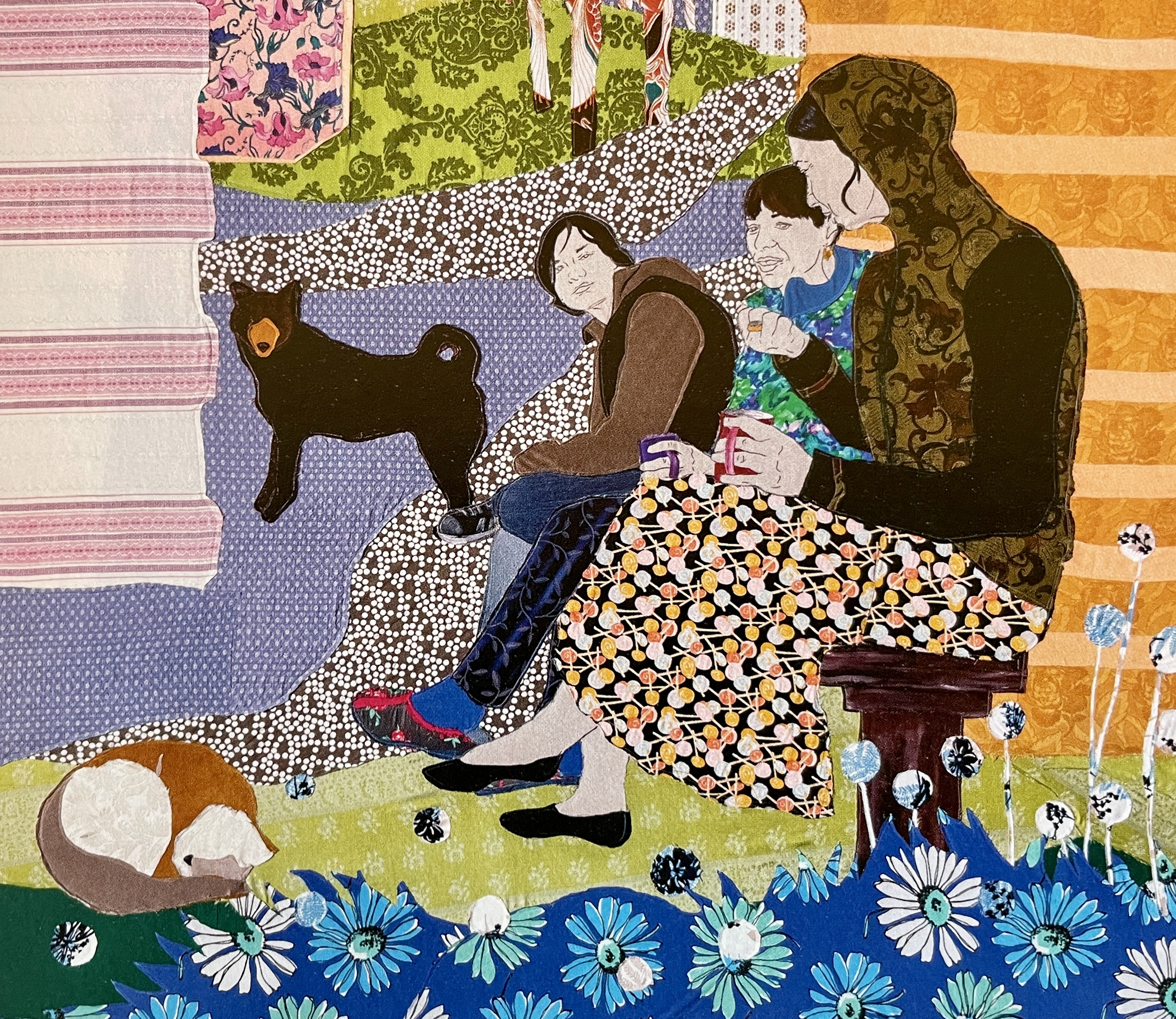
Małgorzata Mirga-Tas, Re-Enchanting the World (detail)

She started her career as a cardboard sculptor. She developed a unique method of using cardboard, glue and different materials in order to sculpt animal and human figures. Later she sculpted figures of people from wax. After that, she moved on to painting with paint on cardboard, and later on in paint on canvas. Her current works are created in mixed media technique. Her works are characterized by strong colors; she uses different materials such as textile, fur, beads, feathers and even playing cards in order to give a three-dimensional touch to her work. In her work she is influenced by the Harlem Renaissance movement of the 1920s and 1930s, as well as colorful African art and the African-American artist Kerry James Marshall. Her work, despite its strong colors, depict a very realistic reality: a woman smoking a cigarette, playing cards, hanging laundry.

One of her most famous works is a sculpture from 2011 commemorating the Nazi massacre of 29 Romani people near Borzęcin, Lesser Poland Voivodeship.

In her early works, she described the transition in the 1960s and 1970s of the Romani people from a nomadic life to a permanent settlement in villages and cities. Her exhibition "Out of Egypt" (2021) at the Arsenal Gallery in Białystok is about the life of the Romani people in the 17th century, a nomadic life before settling in permanent settlements.

As an activist, while still a student at the university, she dealt with education and training for young Romani in Poland. In 2007, together with Bogumiła Delimata and Krzysztof Gil, she founded the Romani art movement in Poland. Between 2012–2016, she initiated an open artists' village for female artists of Romani origin. In 2017 she was involved in the establishment of ERIAC, a Romani art center in Berlin.

She had exhibitions at the 11th Biennale in Berlin (2020), at the Center for Polish Sculpture in Orońsko (2020), at the Museum of Modern Art in Warsaw (2020).

=== Re-Enchanting the World ===
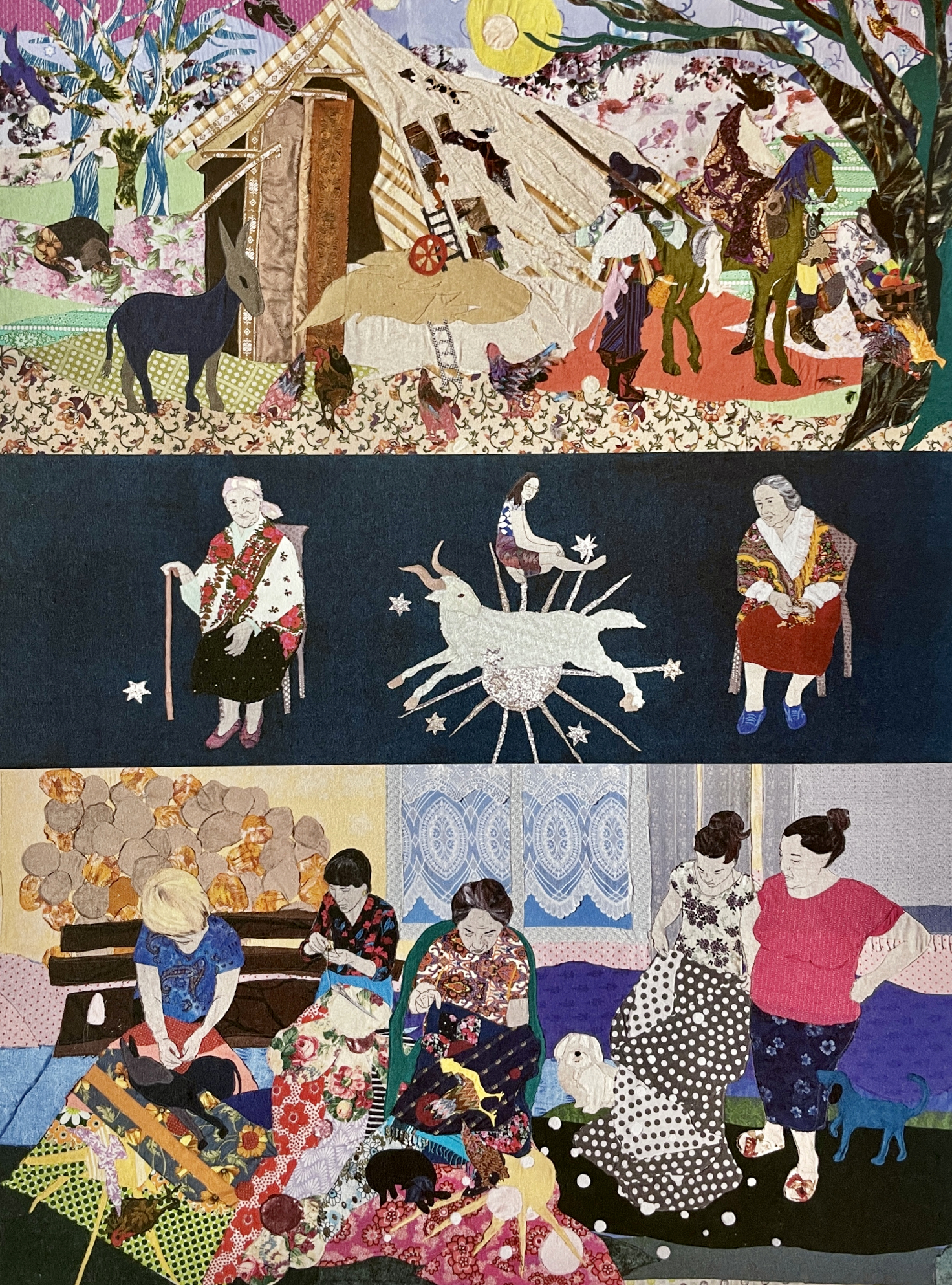
Małgorzata Mirga-Tas, Re-Enchanting the World (detail)

In 2022 Mirga-Tas represented Poland at the 59th Venice Biennale as part of the "Milk of Dreams" exhibition, where she was the first Romani artist to represent any country at this art event. The solo exhibition was entitled "Re-Enchanting the World".

The installation consisted of twelve large-format, three-part fabrics referring to the famous "calendar" cycle of frescoes from Palazzo Schifanoia in Ferrara. Paintings depicting the Olympian gods, zodiac signs and scenes from the life of the court in Ferrara, which are fundamental to European art history, were used by the artist to talk about the specific Polish-Roma identity. The artist prepared reinterpretations of these images and motifs by including elements of Polish-Roma culture and "disenchanting" stereotypical narratives about the Roma.

The work of Małgorzata Mirga-Tas was an attempt to expand the Polish and European iconosphere and art history to include representations of Roma culture. The artist created a world constantly subjected to "conversion", which became a kind of shelter offering hope and respite for the recipients.

Most of the materials and textiles used by Małgorzata Mirga-Tas come from people the artist knows and sometimes portrays in her works. The work also used clothes from second-hand stores, which - as the artist noted - were probably produced in India or China and then came to Poland. Upcycling these fabrics and using found objects such as playing cards, pins and earrings adds another layer to the work.

In addition to the exhibition, a catalog was created in Polish and English. It included texts by the curators and essays by invited writers - Ali Smith and Damian Le Bas, scholar Ethel Brooks, as well as poems by Teresa Mirga and Jan Mirga.

In 2023 she presented a solo exhibition at the Zachęta National Gallery of Art in Warsaw, Poland. She presented another solo exhibition at the Brücke Museum in Berlin, Germany.
