= Ignasi Aballí =

Spanish artist (born 1958)

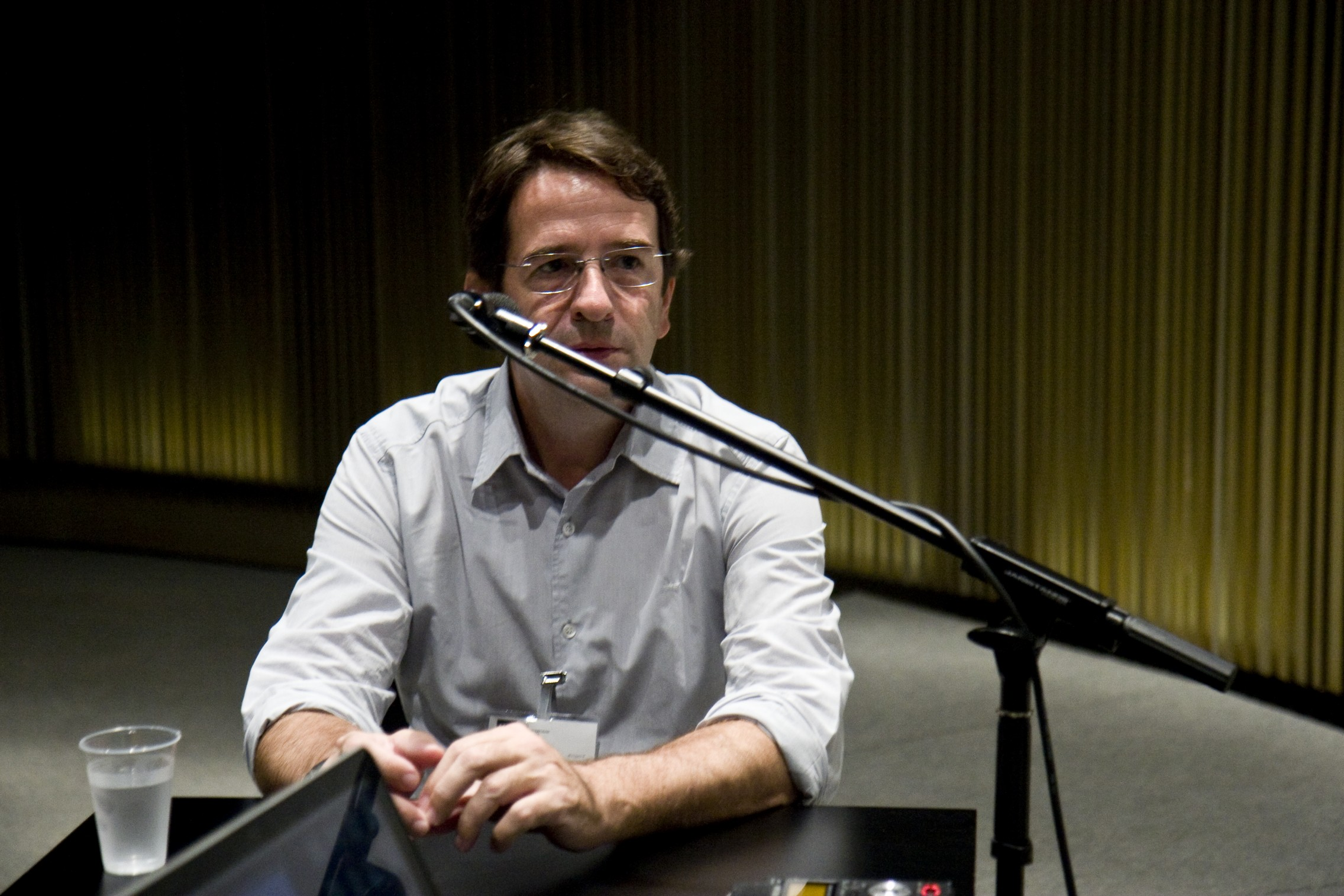
- Ignasi Aballi at the Barcelona Museum of Contemporary Art
- Born: 1958 (age 67–68)
- Occupations: Artist, Painter

Ignasi Aballí (born in 1958) is a Spanish artist, including painter.

== Exhibitions ==
He has exhibited at the Venice Biennale, the Gwangju Biennale and the Biennale of Sydney. He received the Joan Miró prize in 2015.

Aballí held a traveling exhibition between 1995 and 2015, which involved shows at the Barcelona Museum of Contemporary Art in Barcelona (Spain), the Ikon Gallery in Birmingham (England), and ZKM in Karlsruhe (Germany). He exhibited at the Museo Nacional Centro de Arte Reina Sofía in Madrid in 2015.

== Sources ==
- Steverlynck, Sam (1 February 2011). "Luchtig conceptualisme". Agenda.
- Andrews, Max (2 September 2006). "Ignasi Aballí. Museu d'Art Contemporani de Barcelona". Frieze Magazine.
- Meichier, Frédérique (13 February 2015). "Translations à la Kunsthalle". L'Alsace.
- Pioda, Stéphane (1 March 2015). "Et aussi...". Beaux-Arts Magazine: 132.
