= Khaled Sabsabi =

Australian artist (born 1965)

- Born: 1965 (age 60–61); Tripoli, Lebanon
- Citizenship: Australian
- Education: Master of Fine Arts
- Known for: Contemporary art, video installations
- Notable work: Naqshbandi Greenacre engagement (2011); Gates of Light (2014)
- Awards: Helen Lempriere Travelling Art Scholarship (2010); Blake Prize for Religious Art (2011)

Khaled Sabsabi (born 1965) is a Lebanese-born Australian artist based in Sydney, especially known for his video installations. His work, executed in many different media, often incorporates themes of Islam and Arab identity in Australia, along with exploration of spirituality and multiculturalism, and has been exhibited nationally and internationally since 1999. He came to wider public notice in February 2025 after being selected, along with curator Michael Dagostino, to represent Australia in the Australian pavilion at the 2026 Venice Biennale, before the decision was rescinded by Creative Australia around a week later, causing a large backlash that was widely covered by news media. After after an independent external review of the decision, the pair were reinstated as Australia's Biennale artists on 2 July 2025.

== Early life and education ==
Khaled Sabsabi was born in 1965 in Tripoli, Lebanon. He left Tripoli with his family in late 1976, during the Lebanese Civil War, and has lived and worked in the western suburbs of Sydney since then. His parents ran a video shop and music business that specialised in Arabic music.

Khaled holds a Master of Fine Arts from the University of New South Wales.

== Musical career ==
As a teen in the 1980s, Sabsabi was a hip hop performer known as Peacefender, and was exposed to and influenced by the activist Malcolm X. He was a fan of Prince and funk music, as well as hip hop artists such as Eric B & Rakim and Public Enemy. He performed music through to the 1990s.

He also became interested in film, and after moving to visual art, continued to incorporate music and film in his work.

== Themes and artistic practice ==
Sabsabi's artistic work has often incorporated themes of Islam and Arab identity, along with stereotypes associated with these identities in Australia.

His work is informed by the trauma of war and having to leave his country, and other themes that recur in his work include multiculturalism, Sufism, and other faith systems. His work features various religions' symmetries, symbols, and forms, along with their histories and relationships to culture and place. He also expresses the importance of faiths in fostering understanding between peoples and, on the other hand to cause conflict; but also, the parts they play in people's everyday lives. When asked to select artists in the Art Gallery of NSW in whose work he has found similarities and inspiration, he chose Gordon Bennett, Brook Andrew, Hossein Valamanesh, and Mona Hatoum.

He works across different media, from acrylic paint and oil sticks on paper to large immersive installations which include sound, scents, and video.

In 2002, Sabsabi travelled back to Lebanon for an extended stay, which he says "became a significant moment in my creative career, forcing me to question, reflect and redefine my philosophical perspective and contemporary visual arts practice". Sabsabi visited Lebanon, Syria, Turkey, and Morocco several times, as well as China, Cyprus, Germany, Holland, Malaysia, Poland, and Sharjah and Dubai in the UAE.

As of 2025, Sabsabi works out of a converted garage in the Sydney suburb of Green Valley.

== Visual arts career ==
=== Early career ===
In 2018, Sabsabi's work was exhibited in the Samstag Museum of Art, Adelaide, as part of the 2018 Adelaide Biennial Divided Worlds.

In 2022, Sabsabi withdrew from the Sydney Festival, along with around 20 other artists, in protest against its sponsorship deal with the Israeli embassy, which led to receiving threatening messages from anonymous people. Sabsabi has said "I genuinely believe that we need to exist and coexist".

In 2024, his work was presented at the Art Gallery of South Australia in Adelaide, as part of the 2024 Adelaide Biennial, Inner Sanctum.

His work has been exhibited both in Australia and internationally. From September to November 2024, the most significant exhibition of his work so far premiered at The Lock-Up in Newcastle, New South Wales, called Khaled Sabsabi, while he was artist-in-residence there. It featured works produced over nearly 20 years, including works never seen by the public.

=== Venice Biennale ===
On 7 February 2025, Creative Australia announced that Sabsabi had been selected, along with curator Michael Dagostino, to represent Australia in the Australian pavilion at the 2026 Venice Biennale. The choice was made by five independent experts who first shortlisted of six artists, before selecting the successful candidate. Sabsabi said that he was somewhat "shocked" to be chosen, because of "who I am", but was very honoured by the selection. Dagostino is a champion of western Sydney artists who was director of Campbelltown Arts Centre for 11 years before being appointed director of Chau Chak Wing Museum, part of the University of Sydney, in 2023. CEO Adrian Collette said Sabsabi's and Dagostino's work "reflects the diversity and plurality of Australia's rich culture, and will spark meaningful conversations with audiences around the world". The announcement was made at Parramatta Artists Studio in Granville, and celebrated by western Sydney artists. Sabsabi said that his work would be "an inclusive place... a place to bring people together".

On 11 February 2025 The Australian newspaper published an article written by Yoni Bashan and Nick Evans, entitled "Arts council takes creative approach to racism", which was republished on Facebook by the Australian Jewish Association the following day. The authors had apparently discovered Sabsabi's 2007 video installation You, featuring the Hezbollah leader Hassan Nasrallah, and a 2006 work referencing the September 11 attacks, (Note: Thank You Very Much) and criticised the selection of the artist on the basis of these works, without providing context in their descriptions of these works. Against a background of recent incidents of antisemitism in Australia, shadow arts minister Claire Chandler suggested in parliament that the Albanese government was to blame for "allowing a person who highlights a terrorist leader in his artwork to represent Australia on the international stage at the Venice Biennale". Arts minister Tony Burke rang Collette, who said that they were having a board meeting that night, Burke affirming later that he had offered his support regardless of the organisation's decision.

In a late-night meeting on 13 February, the board of Creative Australia board decided to revoke the commission, in an unprecedented move. The decision was described as unanimous; however, Larissa Behrendt was not present at the meeting. They issued a statement saying "The Board believes a prolonged and divisive debate about the 2026 selection outcome poses an unacceptable risk to public support for Australia's artistic community and could undermine our goal of bringing Australians together through art and creativity". The artist and curator said that the reversal of the decision had left them personally and professionally traumatised.

The move led to significant backlash in the arts community; see below. However, Creative Australia staff were told by chair Robert Morgan and CEO Collette on 20 February 2025 that the withdrawal decision would not be revised. Sabsabi and Dagostini issued a statement on Instagram expressing their disappointment, saying that they hoped to be able to present their work on a global platform. Artist Ben Quilty has pointed out that at the time that You was created in 2007, Nasrallah was regarded as "a legitimate political leader in the Middle East", and Hezbollah was not designated a proscribed terrorist organisation in Australia until 2021. There had been no complaints received by the MCA, where it was exhibited.

In late March, Sabsabi and Dagostino launched a public fundraising campaign aimed at exhibiting their works independently at Venice. In April 2025, Sabsabi said that Creative Australia's decision had "dismantled" his career, and having a chilling effect on other artists whose work may engage critically with political issues. He said that Chandler's claims about his work were "disgusting", and led others to misrepresent his work by not viewing it fully and stripping it of context.

After an independent external review of the decision by Blackhall & Pearl, the pair were reinstated on 2 July 2025. The following day, acting chair of Creative Australia, playwright Wesley Enoch, apologised for the "hurt and pain" caused by the rescindment.

=== After Biennale ===
In October 2025 Creative Australia commissioned work from Sabsabi to be exhibited in the Samstag Museum of Art in Adelaide after the Venice Biennale in 2026.

== Other activities and views ==
Sabsabi has worked as a community arts worker in Palestinian refugee camps in Lebanon.

In Western Sydney, he has worked with communities to create and develop arts programs and projects exploring "the complexities of place, displacement, identity and ideological differences associated with migrant experiences and marginalisation".

Since 2021 and as of February 2025 Sabsabi is on the board of the Biennale of Sydney.

With regard to the Israeli-Hamas conflict, he has said that the violence and destruction in Gaza was "inhumane and unacceptable"; however, he supports peace "and the possibility of that dream".

== Recognition and appraisals ==
Sabsabi was awarded a Helen Lempriere Travelling Art Scholarship in 2010, and has also been awarded an Australia Council for the Arts Community Cultural Development Fellowship.

Sabsabi's 2011 work Naqshbandi Greenacre engagement was awarded the Blake Prize for Religious Art – the first time this prize had been given to a work representing an aspect of Islamic faith.

In 2024 he was invited to be artist-in-residence at The Lock-Up in Newcastle.

Kon Gouriotis, in an essay about Sabsabi's work 40,000 Veils, said "Sabsabi's interpretation of the Prophet is a transgressive view. It falls somewhere between being a respectful witness and an outsider to Islamic teaching".

Media artist and academic John Gillies described Sabsabi as "a thoughtful and peaceful person", and his selection for Venice was praised by Nicholas Tsoutas, former head of Sydney gallery Artspace.

== Selected works ==
Significant works include:

- Thank You Very Much (2006), an 18-second video work referencing the September 11 attacks, the title being taken from a George W. Bush quote included in the piece, implying in a deliberately provocative way that Bush is grateful for the attack because it would give him an excuse to invade Afghanistan
- You (2007), which includes a recording of a speech by Hezbollah leader Hassan Nasrallah following the withdrawal of Israeli forces from Lebanon after the 2006 Lebanon War
- Co-existence (2009), featuring an inverted ziggurat comprising flags and logos of political parties contesting the 2009 elections in Lebanon
- Fuck Off We're Full (2009)
- Edge of Elsewhere (2010), a multimedia installation at the Campbelltown Arts Centre
- Naqshbandi Greenacre Engagement (2011), an engagement with Sufi religious practices
- 70,000 Veils (2014), a video installation which includes 10,000 images was 10 years in the making, "explor[ing] the relationship between religion and spirituality in the digital era"
- Gates of Light (2014), a permanent installation in a park in Macarthur Heights, consisting of three pointed arches, or gates and illuminated at night, providing a basic sky map to various astronomical constellations
- Guerrilla (2007-2016), comprising 33 images based on photos taken by Sabsabi in 2006 documenting the immediate aftermath of the Israel–Hezbollah War

== Exhibitions ==
Sabsabi has exhibited in Australia, Argentina, Brazil, Canada, China, France, Germany, Italy, Lebanon, New Zealand, Poland, and Spain; these include New Media Fest, Soundlab, Beirut Arts Festival, the Monographic Sample of Art Average Colombia, and 3rd Digital Art Festival in Argentina and Italy.

=== Group exhibitions ===
- 1999: Living Here Now – Art and Politics, Australian Perspecta
- 2006: Interdigitate, Moving Image Centre, Auckland, New Zealand
- 2007: The Resilient Landscape, Ivan Dougherty Gallery, Sydney
- 2007: ASIA – EUROPE Mediations, National Gallery, Poznań, Poland
- 2007: Soft Power: Asian Attitudes, Shanghai Zendai Museum of Modern Art, Shanghai
- 2009: Making It New: Focus on Contemporary Australian Art, Museum of Contemporary Art, Sydney
- 2009: Out of Place, Galerie Nord | Kunstverein Tiergarten, Berlin
- 2009: Making It New: Focus on Contemporary Australian Art, Museum of Contemporary Art, Sydney
- 2010: Present Tense: An imagined grammar of portraiture in the digital age, National Portrait Gallery, Canberra
- 2012: Edge of Elsewhere (Sydney Festival) Campbelltown Arts Centre and Gallery 4A, Sydney
- 2012: 18th Biennale of Sydney
- 2013: Sharjah Biennial 11: Re:emerge: Towards a New Cultural Cartography, Sharjah, UAE
- 2014: The Australian Platform, Art Stage Singapore
- 2014: Where We Are Now, 5th Marrakech Biennale, Morocco
- 2014: Subject to Ruin, Casula Powerhouse Arts Centre, Sydney
- 2017: The National 2017: New Australian Art, Art Gallery of New South Wales (Guerrilla)
- 2018: Between Suns, Cement Fondu, Sydney, curated by Megan Monte

=== Solo exhibitions ===
- 2005: Ali Or 'Ali: Khaled Sabsabi, held simultaneously at the Casula Powerhouse Arts Centre and the Campbelltown Arts Centre, curated by Lisa Havilah and Anna Bazzi Backhouse
- 2009: Integration, Assimilation and a fair go for ALL, Gallery 4A
- 2024: Khaled Sabsabi (major retrospective), The Lock-Up, Newcastle
- 2026: Between Suns (major survey exhibition), Vessel Contemporary, Fremantle

== Collections ==
Sabsabi's work in held in several private and public collections, including:

- Art Gallery of Western Australia, Perth
- Campbelltown Arts Centre, New South Wales
- Casoria Contemporary Art Museum, Casoria, Italy
- Casula Powerhouse Arts Centre, Sydney
- Museum of Contemporary Art, Sydney (including You, Co-existence, and Naqshbandi Greenacre Engagement

== Biennale backlash ==
Reactions to the revocation of the Biennale commission included:

- an open letter signed by over 4000 people (as of 24 February 2025)
- an open letter demanding that the artists be reinstated, signed by 23 artists who have exhibited their work at the Venice Biennale since 1978, including Judy Watson, Imants Tillers, Mike Parr, Susan Norrie, Fiona Hall, Patricia Piccinini, Tracey Moffat, Shaun Gladwell, Angelica Mesiti, and Marco Fusinato, as well as the estates of Howard Arkley and John Davis, with permission given by the families. The letter was published in The Sun-Herald and The Sunday Age, paid for by a number of artists, intellectuals, and art philanthropists.
- several resignations at Creative Australia, including the visual arts department head Mikala Tai, program manager Tahmina Maskinyar, artist Lindy Lee, who was a board member
- a joint statement issued by the other five artistic teams shortlisted for Biennale on 14 February 14, calling the dismissal of Sabsabi and Agostine "antithetical to the goodwill and hard-fought artistic independence, freedom of speech and moral courage that is that the core of artist in Australia..." and calling for reinstatement
- a statement by the National Association for the Visual Arts calling for their reinstatement, saying "Government interference in the expert panel's selection process undermines the very principle of independence"
- revocation of support for the Australian Pavilion by former Venice Biennale commissioner Simon Mordant, and resignation from his position as Australia's international ambassador for the show as well as financial support, saying :"the suggestion that he supports terrorism or racism or antisemitism is outrageous" and the decision "despicable"
- a statement addressed to Creative Australia by Archie Moore and curator Ellie Buttrose, who presented their prizewinning kith and kin at the Venice Biennale in 2024, calling for reinstatement of their selection
- statements by artists Kate Just and Nigel Helyer; by Fiona Winning, former director of programming at Sydney Opera House; by Elizabeth Ann Macgregor, former director of the Museum of Contemporary Art Australia (MCA), who also said "it's awful for Australia" (with regard to international partnerships in the art world)
- Erin Madeley, CEO of the Media, Entertainment and Arts Alliance, called for an end to political interference in artistic practice

The Sydney Morning Herald published an article by Elizabeth Ann Macgregor, in which she criticised the decision and gave examples of displays of other controversial artworks, writing "It is rarely the public that complains – controversy is driven by the media". Callum Morton, who represented Australia at Venice in 2007, said that he had "never seen the level of unity and anger as this" among artists.

== Bibliography ==
- Erin McFadden, Kon Gouriotis, and Melissa Pesa, eds. Khaled Sabsabi. Bandicoot Publishing, 2023.
