= Alexie Glass-Kantor =

Australian cultural historian

Alexie Glass-Kantor is an Australian art curator. Since 2025, she has served as executive director, curatorial at Art Dubai Group. From 2013 until 2024, she held the position of executive director of Artspace Visual Arts Centre in Sydney.

== Early life and education ==
Alexie Glass-Kantor was born in Sydney, New South Wales, and spent her childhood living in regional NSW.

She holds a Bachelor of Art Theory (Hons) degree from the University of New South Wales (then the College of Fine Arts) with majors in photography and English literature. Her honours dissertation was marked by Nick Waterlow, who later mentored her.

== Career ==
Glass-Kantor worked as curator for ACMI (Australian Centre for the Moving Image) in Melbourne from 2002 to 2005. In 2005, she worked as curator-in-residence at Ssamzie Space, Seoul.

From around 2007 until late 2013, she held the position of director and senior curator at Gertrude Contemporary, Melbourne. During this time, she formed part of the curatorial team of the 7th International Santa Fe Biennale in 2008, and in 2012, with Natasha Bullock, Glass-Kantor co-curated Parallel Collisions, the 12th Adelaide Biennial of Australian Art at the Art Gallery of South Australia in Adelaide, South Australia.

In December 2013, she was appointed executive director of Artspace, in Sydney's Woolloomooloo. In a 2013 interview with Ocula magazine, Glass-Kantor said that a goal during her tenure at Artspace was to engage in collaborative projects alongside fellow institutions in the Asia-Pacific region. Since 2015, Glass-Kantor has been the curator for Art Basel Hong Kong’s Encounters section, the sector dedicated to large-scale installations. International exhibitions Glass-Kantor has curated during her time as Artspace Executive Director include Nicholas Mangan: Ancient Lights, Chisenhale Gallery, London, UK (2015), Angelica Mesiti: Relay League at Art Sonje, Seoul, South Korea (2019), Taloi Havini: Reclamation at Dhaka Art Summit, Bangladesh (2020), 경로를 재탐색합니다 UN/LEARNING AUSTRALIA at Seoul Museum of Art, South Korea (2021), and Jonathan Jones: untitled (transcriptions of country) at Palais de Tokyo, Paris, France (2021). Following a multimillion-dollar redevelopment that secured the future of Artspace for the next 35 years, she left the post in September 2024.

In 2022, Glass-Kantor curated Marco Fusinato: Desastres at the Australian pavilion at the 59th Venice Biennale. The Washington Post selected the Australian Pavilion as one of the best three at the 2022 Biennale, although Glass-Kantor explained that she and Fusinato were "much more interested in proposition, in open-ended speculation, in confrontation and giving people the space and agency to decide for themselves, if they do or don't like something, what that means for them." Similarly, Ocula Magazine wrote "People either love or hate this pavilion ... At least they felt something so strongly as to articulate a thought." The exhibition welcomed around 2,000 visitors per day.

From 2013 until 2024, she held the position of executive director of Artspace Visual Arts Centre in Sydney.

In April 2025, Glass-Kantor was appointed as executive director, curatorial at Art Dubai Group, a newly-created leadership role. Since 2025, she has served as executive director, curatorial at Art Dubai Group. From 2013 until 2024, she held the position of executive director of Artspace Visual Arts Centre in Sydney. Her appointment marked a strategic expansion of Art Dubai Group's curatorial programming and international collaborations.

== Other roles and activities ==
Glass-Kantor served on the board of the National Association for the Visual Arts (NAVA) from 2010 to 2014, and since 2015, she has been the chair of Contemporary Art Organisations Australia (CAOA).
