= Australian pavilion =

Venice Biennale national pavilion

Coordinates: 45.4284°N 12.3590°E

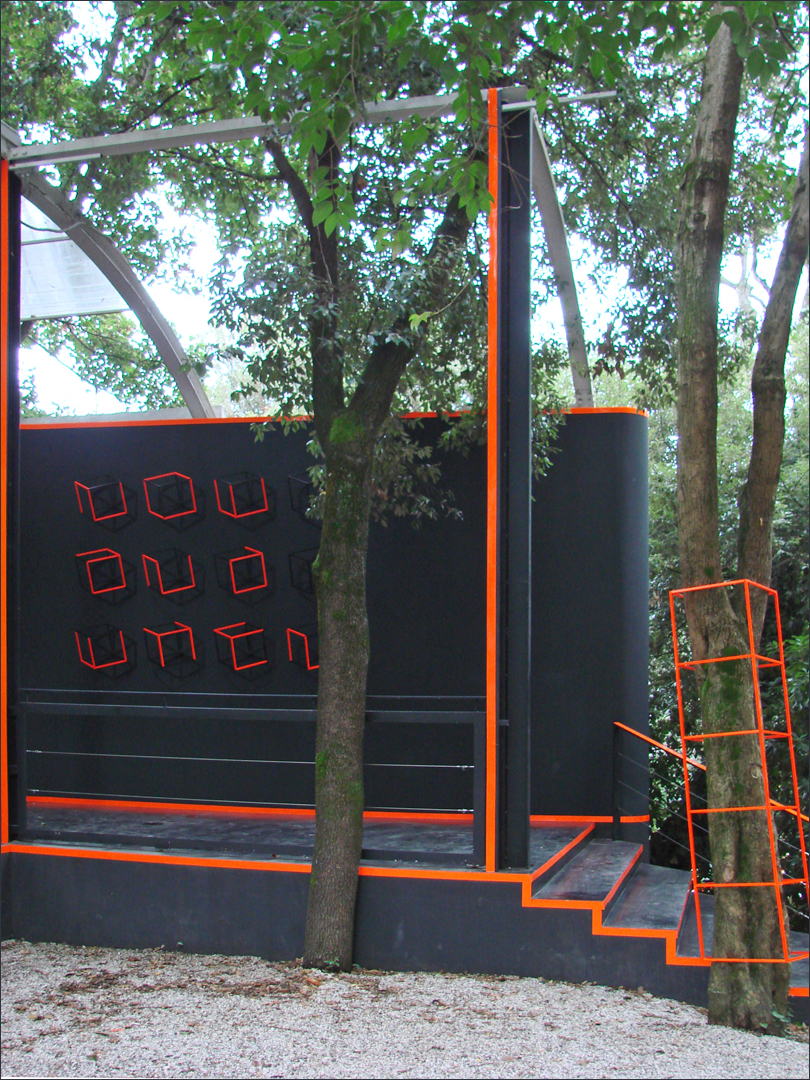
Pavilion entrance

The Australian pavilion is a structure that houses Australia's national representation during the Venice Biennale arts and architecture festivals. Although Australia has been represented at the arts festival since 1954, the first pavilion was only built in 1987, and replaced by a permanent structure in 2015.

== Background ==
The Venice Biennale is an international art biennial exhibition held in Venice, Italy. Often described as "the Olympics of the art world", participation in the Biennale is a prestigious event for contemporary artists. The festival has become a constellation of shows: a central exhibition curated by that year's artistic director, national pavilions hosted by individual nations, and independent exhibitions held throughout Venice. The Biennale's parent organisation also runs regular festivals in other arts: architecture, dance, film, music and theatre.

Outside the central international exhibition, individual nations produce their own shows, known as pavilions, as their national representation. Nations that own their pavilion buildings – such as the 30 housed in the Giardini – are responsible for their own upkeep and construction costs as well. Nations without dedicated buildings create pavilions in venues throughout the city. Formal participation by Australia in the Venice Biennale began in 1954. From 1978, the Australian Council for the Arts (now Creative Australia), managed and supported the national representation in the festival. In 2019 the Australia Council took over the commissioning of the works, which it does by open call for proposals.

As of 2024 there are 29 national pavilions built over a long period of time within the Giardini della Biennale (Biennale Gardens).

== Buildings ==
=== Original pavilion (1987) ===
The Australian pavilion was designed in 1987 by the Australia Council's Design Arts Board and constructed by 1988. The two-level single exhibition space includes a veranda-style entrance with a courtyard constructed around a pre-existing tree. This connection between internal space and landscape was designed to relate to architectural themes in Australia. The curvature of the pavilion's sheet metal roof is meant to invoke a wave.

The original Australian Pavilion, designed by Philip Cox to be a temporary structure of fiber cement and steel, was opened in 1988 at the western edge of the Giardini. Italian-born Australian industrialist Franco Belgiorno-Nettis had previously lobbied so successfully that in 1988 Australia beat 16 other countries to the last site on which to build a permanent pavilion in the Giardini. Cox and other generous donors gifted the pavilion to the Commonwealth Government. The pavilion was not heritage-protected because of its temporary status.

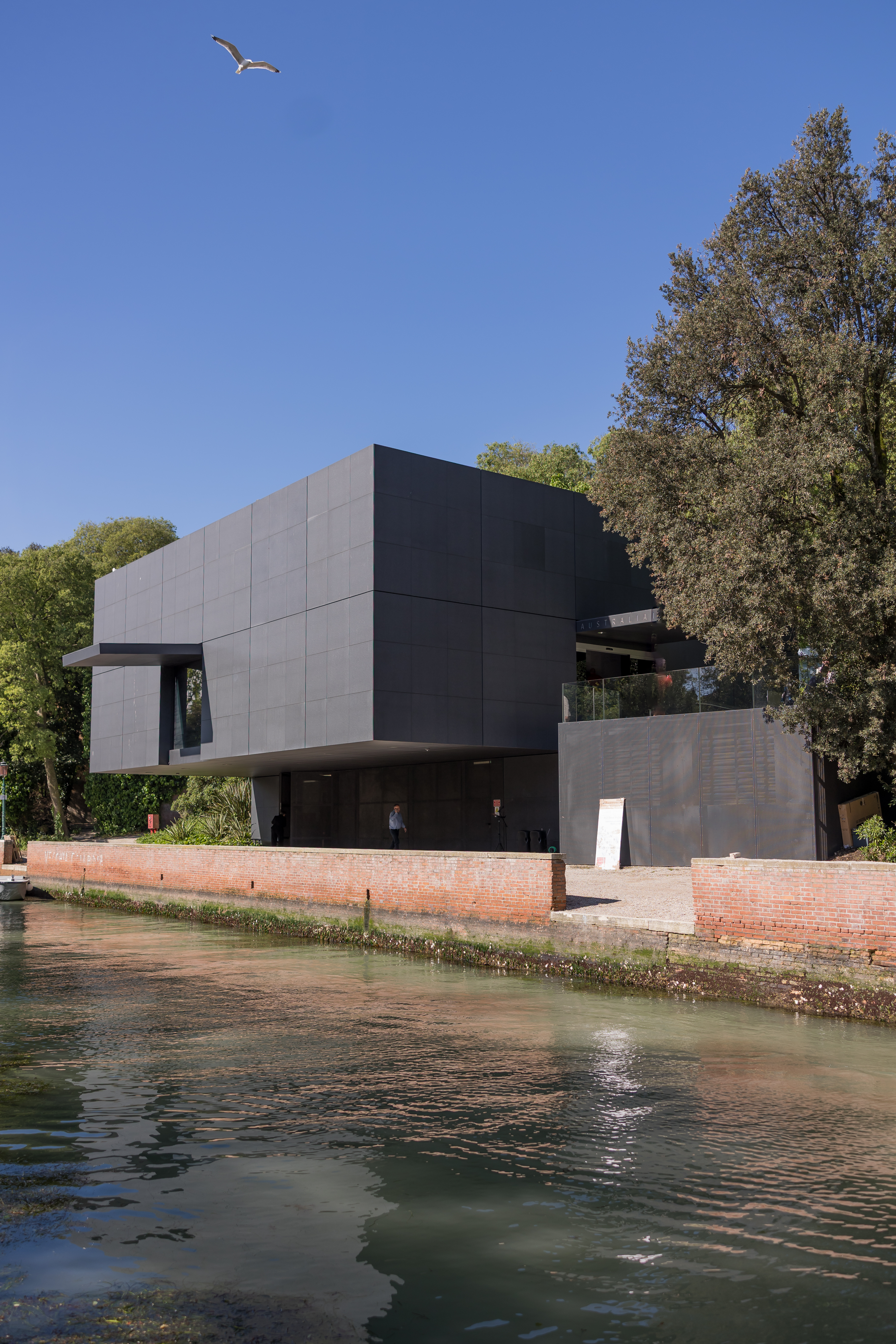
Australian Pavillon, Venice Biennale

=== New pavilion (2015) ===
A new, permanent pavilion was designed by architectural practice Denton Corker Marshall and completed in 2015. Built from concrete and steel, the two-storey structure contains 240 m^{2} (2,600 sq ft) of exhibition space, and the exterior is covered in black granite from Zimbabwe.

Although Australia's participation at the Venice Biennale was being managed by the Australia Council, funded by the Commonwealth Government, all of the A$6 million originally needed for the new building had to be raised from the private sector. Eventually, the pavilion cost $7.5 million to build, $1 million of which was funded by the Australia Council; the rest was donated by 82 private Australian donors, including actress Cate Blanchett and producer Santo Cilauro.

The pavilion has won several architectural awards:

- 2012: First Prize – Design Competition
- 2016: AIA National Jorn Utzon Award for the Most Outstanding Work of International Architecture
- 2016: AIA International Architecture Awards – Award for Most Outstanding Work of Public Architecture Abroad

== Representation by year ==
Until 2019, the Art Biennale used to take place in odd years and the Architecture Biennale in even years, but after the COVID-19 pandemic forced a postponement, the Art Biennale now takes place in even years (2022, 2024) and the Architecture Biennale in odd years (2021, 2023).

=== In the arts festival ===
==== Before the pavilion was built ====
- 1954 — Sidney Nolan, Russell Drysdale, William Dobell
- 1956 — Albert Tucker
- 1958 — Arthur Streeton, Arthur Boyd
- 1978 — Ken Unsworth, John Davis, Robert Owen
- 1980 — Mike Parr, Tony Coleing, Kevin Mortensen
- 1982 — Peter Booth, Rosalie Gascoigne
- 1984 — no participation
- 1986 — Imants Tillers

==== In the first Australian Pavilion ====
- 1988 — Arthur Boyd (Curator: Grazia Gunn) (Peter Tyndall was exhibited in the Arsenale)
- 1990 — Trevor Nickolls, Rover Thomas
- 1993 — Jenny Watson (Curator: Judy Annear)
- 1995 — Bill Henson (Curator: Isobel Crombie)
- 1997 — Judy Watson, Yvonne Koolmatrie, Emily Kngwarreye (Curators: Hetti Perkins, Brenda L Croft, Victoria Lynn)
- 1999 — Howard Arkley (Curator: Timothy Morrell)
- 2001 — Lyndal Jones (Curator: John Barret-Lennard)
- 2003 — Patricia Piccinini (Curator: Linda Michael)
- 2005 — Ricky Swallow (Curator: Charlotte Day)
- 2007 — Callum Morton, Susan Norrie, Daniel von Sturmer
- 2009 — Shaun Gladwell, Vernon Ah Kee, Ken Yonetani, Claire Healy and Sean Cordeiro (Curator: Felicity Fenner)
- 2011 — Hany Armanious (Curator: Anne Ellegood)
- 2013 — Simryn Gill (Curator: Catherine de Zegher)

==== In the new Australian pavilion ====
- 2015 — Fiona Margaret Hall (Curator: Linda Michael)
- 2017 — Tracey Moffatt (Curator: Natalie King)
- 2019 — Angelica Mesiti (Curator: Juliana Engberg)
- 2022 — Marco Fusinato (Curator: Alexie Glass-Kantor)
- 2024 — Archie Moore's kith and kin' (Curator: Ellie Buttrose); winner of the Golden Lion award for Best National Participation

=== In the architecture festival ===
Titles and Creative directors for each year's representation in the national pavilion at the architecture festival are as follows:

- 2006 — "Micro Macro City", Shane Murray and Nigel Bertram
- 2008 — "Abundant", Neil Durbach, Vince Frost, Wendy Lewin, Kerstin Thompson, and Gary Warner
- 2010 — "Now and When", John Gollings and Ivan Rijavec
- 2012 — "Formations: New practices in Australian Architecture", Anthony Burke, Gerard Reinmuth, with TOKO concept design
- 2014 — "Augmented Australia: 1914 - 2014", felix._Giles_ Anderson+Goad
- 2016 — "The Pool", Amelia Holliday, Isabelle Toland (Aileen Sage), and Michelle Tabet
- 2018 — "Repair ", Mauro Baracco, Louise Wright with Linda Tegg
- 2020/21 — "Inbetween", Jefa Greenaway and Tristan Wong
- 2023 — "Unsettling Queenstown", Anthony Coupe, Julian Worrall, Emily Paech, Ali Gumillya Baker, and Sarah Rhodes
- 2025 — "Home", Michael Mossman, Emily Mcdaniel and Jack Gillmer-Lilley.
- 2027 — "Lived In", Kerstin Thompson, Maryam Gusheh, Lee-Anne Khor, and Louise Wright.
