= Lock up =

Lock up or Lock-up may refer to:

== Film and television ==
- Lock Up (1989 film), an American prison action film featuring Sylvester Stallone
- Lock Up (2020 film), an Indian Tamil-language thriller film
- Lock-Up (TV series), a 1959 American legal drama series
- Lockup (TV series), a prison documentary series on MSNBC
- "Lockup" (Agents of S.H.I.E.L.D.), a 2016 episode of Agents of S.H.I.E.L.D.
- Lock Upp: Badass Jail, Atyaachari Khel!, an Indian reality OTT series

== Finance ==
- Lock-up provision, a corporate finance term
- Lock-up period, a term concerning initial public offerings of stock

== Music ==
- Lock Up (American band), a rock band, featuring guitarist Tom Morello during his pre-Rage Against the Machine career
- Lock Up (British band), a grindcore band
- Lock Up, an ep by Dance music act Zero B, 1992
- Lock Up, a BBC radio show hosted by Mike Davies featuring mostly punk associated acts
  - Lock Up Stage, a stage at the Reading & Leeds music festival named after the radio show

== Prison ==
- Village lock-up, a small prison once used to detain people temporarily
- Prison cell, used to hold detainees until they are charged

== Other ==
- The Lock-Up, an art gallery in Newcastle, New South Wales, Australia
- Hang (computing), often relatedly, "locked up"
- A self storage facility or other, typically, off-site storage space
- Lock-Up (comics), a character from the Batman comics
- Lock up, particular graphic arrangement of a logo and accompanying elements, such as a company name or a tagline

== See also ==
- Garage (house)
- Locked Up (disambiguation)
- The Lock Up (disambiguation)
