= The Lock Up =

The Lock Up may refer to:

- The Lock Up (TV series), a BBC television programme
- The Lock-Up (art gallery), an art gallery in Newcastle, New South Wales, Australia.

== See also ==
- Lock up (disambiguation)
