= John Gollings =

Australian photographer

John Gollings AM (born 1944), is an Australian architectural photographer working in the Asia Pacific region.

== Early life and education ==
John Gollings was born in Melbourne and made his first photographs using his family's UK-built Houghton-Butcher Box Ensign 6×9 cm camera. He learned darkroom processing at age eleven. He attended Hailebury College where in 1962 he made a photograph now held in the National Gallery of Australia, then until 1967 studied Arts and Architecture at Melbourne University, supplementing his studies with architectural and wedding photography.

In mid-career in 2002, he earned a master's degree in Architecture at RMIT University with the thesis "Torus City: investigating the photography of architecture in a virtual environment".

== Career ==
In the late 1960s Gollings was successful in advertising and fashion photography after joining the partnership of art director Kevin Orpin and advertising photographer Bob Bourne, who became a mentor. After the partners separated, Bourne was replaced by Norman Parkinson’s former assistant Peter Gough, also from London, and Gollings was promoted as the new talent of the studio. At age 22 he garnered the advertising accounts of Shell, Comalco, Sitmar and Marlboro, as well as resorts and hotels like Hyatt, Oberoi and Great Keppel Island resort. Increasingly he also picked up fashion work for firms including Sportsgirl and Levante Hosiery.

Some of his earliest private work, since collected in 2009 by the National Gallery of Australia, was made in New Guinea.

== Architectural photographer ==
After advertising and fashion photography, Gollings settled on architectural photography, in which he has since worked in the Asia Pacific region. In 1973 and inspired by Learning from Las Vegas, Gollings arrived in Surfers Paradise (a well known holiday destination) from Melbourne, with the intention to extensively photograph the town's architecture, signs and symbols of leisure. 40 years later, building on field work in collaboration with Melbourne architect Tony Styant-Browne, urban planner Mal Horner and graphic designer Julie Jame, he undertook a project to re-photograph the city from exactly the same viewpoints. In the mid-seventies he travelled to Los Angeles to shoot a new portfolio featuring modern architecture and in 1976 he received private tuition from Ansel Adams in his darkroom at Carmel, California.

Much of his work involves long-term cultural projects especially in India, Cambodia, China, Libya and New Guinea. He specialises in the documentation of cities, often from the air. He has a particular interest in the cyclic fires and floods that characterise the Australian landscape, which he documents with aerial photography, and is known for his technique of photographing at night using partial artificial light during extended, or periodic, exposure.

== Digital imaging and 3D ==
More lately switching to digital imaging, Gollings has combined 3D modelling with photography and the use of drones in the service of his architectural commissions. With Ivan Rijavek, Gollings was the co-creative director emeritus of the Australian Pavilion at the 2010 edition of the Venice Biennale of Architecture. The exhibition was titled Now and When and compared the existing state of Australian cities, and their counterpoint in the mining holes of the west, to the possibility of a radically different, paradigmatic city of the future. The images were either photographed from a helicopter in 3D or rendered in 3D using CGI. The project traveled Australia and Asia under the auspices of the Australian Department of Foreign Affairs and Trade until 2013.

In 2009-2010, with curators Sarah Kenderdine and Jeffrey Shaw and 3D production by Paul Doornbusch and Dr. L. Subramaniam, Gollings presented the Ancient Hampi exhibition at the Immigration Museum in Melbourne. Hampi is a tow in Karnataka state, India, that lies in the ruins of Vijayanagara City. The exhibition consisted of a collection of Gollings’ black and white night images completed during his visits over the 25 years from 1980 to 2005, adjacent to images in colour of contemporary India. The second component, PLACE-Hampi, was an immersive media installation of 3D panoramas, sound recordings and computer animation viewed with 3D glasses on a rotating platform.

== Books ==
Gollings is widely published and his major books include New Australia Style, City of Victory and Kashgar: Oasis city on the Silk Road. In addition to the inclusion of his photography in many surveys, catalogues and monographs on architecture Thames and Hudson released a monograph of his contemporary architectural work; Beautiful Ugly.

== Recognition ==
Gollings work is exhibited and in many cases, collected, by the Asia Society in New York, the Canadian Centre for Architecture in Montreal, the National Gallery of Australia, the National Gallery of Victoria, the Monash Gallery of Art, the State Library of Queensland, the Janet Holmes à Court collection, the Gold Coast Gallery and the National Library of Australia, and has been the subject of special exhibitions at the Australian Centre for Photography, the Gold Coast Gallery, the Immigration Museum, the Monash Gallery of Art, the McClelland Gallery and the National Gallery of Australia.

Monash Gallery of Art, Melbourne presented a major survey John Gollings: The history of the built world 2 December 2017 to 4 March 2018.

== Honours ==
Gollings received a Visual Arts Board Grant from the Australia Council, has twice been awarded the Presidents Award by the Australian Institute of Architecture and has received many advertising and graphic design awards from Australian, New York and Chicago Art Directors' groups. He is an Honorary Fellow of the Australian Institute of Architects.

In 2016 he was made a Member of the Order of Australia (AM) for "significant service to photography through the documentation of iconic architectural landmarks in Australia and the Asia Pacific region".

== Publications ==
John Gollings' photography is included in the following book publications:

- Massola, Aldo (1968), Bunjil's cave : myths, legends and superstitions of the aborigines of south-east Australia, Lansdowne Press
- Jackson, Daryl; McCaughey, Patrick, 1943-; Jackson, Daryl, 1937-; Gollings, John, 1944-; Safer, Jaro, 1946- (1984), Daryl Jackson, architecture, drawings and photographs, Macmillan, ISBN 978-0-333-38046-8
- Jackson, Daryl (1984), Daryl Jackson architecture : drawings and photographs, Macmillan
- Corrigan, Peter (author.); Gollings, John, (photographer.); McConnel, Smith and Johnson (architects); Clive Lucas & Partners Pty. Ltd (architects); Edmond & Corrigan (architects) (1986), State Library and Museum of Victoria : a report on the Commissioned proposal, Edmond & Corrigan
- Greenlaw, Alexander J. (Alexander John); Nagaraja Rao, M. S; Gollings, John; Karnataka (India). Directorate of Archaeology & Museums (1988), Vijayanagara : through the eyes of Alexander J. Greenlaw, 1856, John Gollings, 1983 (1st ed.), Govt. of Karnataka, Directorate of Archaeology & Museums
- Smith, Alexander; University of New South Wales. School of Architecture; University of New South Wales (1988), Australian architectural photographers : a comparison of their philosophies and approaches
- Dupain, Max, 1911-1992; Gollings, John, 1944- (1988), Harry Seidler & Associates : towers in the city, Edizioni Tecno
- Frampton, Kenneth; Seidler, Harry, 1923-2006; Gollings, John, 1944- (1988), Riverside Centre, Harry Seidler, Horwitz Grahame, ISBN 978-0-7255-2056-4
- Ashton, Paul; Blackmore, Kate, 1949-; Gollings, John (1988), Centennial Park : a history, NSWU Press; Beaverton, OR, USA : Distributed in the U.S. and Canada through International Specialized Book Services, ISBN 978-0-86840-346-5
- Gollings, John; Rice, Louise; Gollings, John, 1944-; Greene, Paul; Hopkins, Ted, 1949- (1989), Melbourne, William Heinemann Australia, ISBN 978-0-85561-354-9
- Dupain, Max, 1911-1992; Gollings, John, 1944- (1991), Harry Seidler & Associates : architects & planners, Harry Seidler & Associates
- Sudjic, Deyan; Sudjic, Deyan; Gollings, John, 1944- (1991), Australian Embassy, Tokyo : architects, Denton Corker Marshall, Wordsearch Ltd, ISBN 978-1-874235-02-6
- Park, Andy; Sive, Veronica; New South Wales. Darling Harbour Authority (1992), Darling Harbour, Darling Harbour Authority, ISBN 978-0-7305-9507-6
- Brand, Michael; Chuch, Phoeurn, 1939-; Australian National Gallery; Sāramandīr Jāti Kambujā (1992), The age of Angkor : treasures from the National Museum of Cambodia, Australian National Gallery, ISBN 978-0-642-13090-7
- xPeddle Thorp; Gollings, John, 1944-; Andersons, Andrew; Haskell, John C (1992), Peddle Thorp, (Available from Peddle Thorp, Level 12, AMP Centre, 50 Bridge St, Sydney NSW 2000) : Peddle Thorp, ISBN 978-0-646-11346-3
- Rawlins, Adrian; Gollings, John (1994), Dylan through the looking glass : a collection of writings on Bob Dylan, The All Night Cafe, ISBN 978-0-646-17712-0
- Gollings, John, 1944-, (photographer.); Royal Melbourne Institute of Technology. Faculty of Environmental Design and Construction, (host institution.) (1996), RMIT Storey Hall, Faculty of Environmental Design and Construction, Royal Melbourne Institute of Technology, ISBN 978-0-86444-497-4
- Palmer, Maudie; Marks, Bryony (1999), Herring Island Environmental Sculpture Park, RMIT University, ISBN 978-0-86459-027-5
- Gollings, John; Michell, George (2000), New Australia style, Thames & Hudson (published 1999), ISBN 978-0-500-28251-9
- Davis, Jodie (2002), Through the lens : international architectural photographers, Images; [Oxford] : [William Snyder] (distributor), ISBN 978-1-876907-26-6
- Gollings, John; RMIT University (2002), Torus City : investigating the photography of architecture in a virtual environment
- Fritz, John M (2003), Hampi, India Book House; Woodbridge : ACC Distribution (published 2002), ISBN 978-81-7508-336-3
- Gollings, John; Michell, George (2003), Inner city living : new Australia style 2, Thames & Hudson, ISBN 978-0-500-51153-4
- Goad, Philip; Gollings, John, 1944-; Royal Australian Institute of Architects. Victorian Chapter (2003), Judging Architecture : issues, Divisions, Triumphs, Victorian Architecture Awards 1929-2003, Royal Australian Institute of Architects, ISBN 978-1-86318-034-4
- Rollo, Joe; Cement Concrete & Aggregates Australia (2004), Concrete poetry : concrete architecture in Australia, Cement Concrete & Aggregates Australia, ISBN 978-1-877023-10-1
- Van Schaik, Leon; Gollings, John (26 May 2006), Design city Melbourne, Wiley-Academy (published 2006), ISBN 978-0-470-01640-4
- Heide Museum of Modern Art (2007), Demeter's garden, Bulleen, Victoria
- Heide Museum of Modern Art (2007), Blue jay way, Bulleen, VictoriaSykes, Stuart; Gollings, John, 1944-; Sykes, Stuart (2008), The Melbourne Cricket Ground : a stadium reborn, News Custom Publishing, Herald & Weekly Times, ISBN 978-1-921116-07-0
- Carter, Jeff; Gollings, John, (photographer.); Parke, Trent, 1971-, (photographer.); Rigney, Virginia, (author,); Gold Coast City Art Gallery (host institution.) (2008), Streets of gold : photographs from Gold Coast Streets 1957-2008 : Jeff Carter, John Gollings, Trent Parke, Gold Coast City Art Gallery
- Gollings, John; Gollings, John, illus; Michell, George; Vicziany, Marika; Tsui, Yen Hu (2008), Kashgar : oasis city on China's Old Silk Road (1st Frances Lincoln ed.), Frances Lincoln, ISBN 978-0-7112-2913-6
- Francis-Jones Morehen Thorp (firm); Francis-Jones, Richard; Morehen, Jeff; Thorp, Richard; Francis-Jones Morehen Thorp (Firm) (2009), In the realm of learning : the University of Sydney's new Law School : incorporating the Faculty of Law, Law Library and General Teaching Complex, Images Publishing, ISBN 978-1-86470-357-3
- O'Hara, Marguerite; Gollings, John, (photographer.); Australian Teachers of Media (2009), Eye for architecture : a study guide, [Australia] Australian Teachers of Media
- Gollings, John; Gollings, John; Rijavec, Ivan; Bremner, Craig; Australian Institute of Architects; International Architectural Exhibition (12th : 2008 : Venice, Italy) (2010), Now and when : Australian urbanism : Australian Pavilion 12th International Architecture Exhibition la Biennale di Venezia 2010, Royal Australian Institute of Architects, ISBN 978-1-86318-038-2
- Gollings, John; Rollo, Joe, (author.) (2011), Beautiful ugly : the architectural photography of John Gollings, Thames & Hudson, ISBN 978-0-500-50031-6
- State Library of Victoria; Carew, Ann (2012), State Library of Victoria : enchanted dome : the library and imagination, State Library of Victoria
- Kenderdine, Sarah; Shaw, Jeffrey, (author.); Greene, J. Patrick, (writer of preface.) (2012), PLACE-Hampi : inhabiting the panoramic imaginary of Vijayanagara, Heidelberg Kehrer Verlag, ISBN 978-3-86828-124-8
- Hamann, Conrad; Van Schaik, Leon; Mitsogianni, Vivian; Callister, Winsome; Watson, Fleur; Gollings, John; Chase & Galley (Firm) (2012), Cities of hope remembered : Cities of hope rehearsed : Australian architecture & stage design by Edmond & Corrigan 1962-2012, Thames & Hudson Australia, ISBN 978-0-500-50034-7
- Guilty landscapes, Stichting Archis, 2012, ISBN 978-90-77966-31-0
- Gollings, John; Rigney, Virginia, (author.); Styant-Browne, Tony, 1946-, (author.) (2013), Learning from Surfers Paradise : a rephotography project : 1973-2013, Gold Coast City Gallery, ISBN 978-0-9871415-4-5
- Ward, Maitiu; Hamann, Conrad; Ward, Maitiu, (Editor.); Bennetts, Peter, (photographer.); Gollings, John, 1944-, (photographer.) (2013), Paul Morgan Architects, Melbourne Uro Media, ISBN 978-0-9872281-7-8
- Gollings, John; Warnes, Diana., (author.); Rockhampton Art Gallery (issuing body.) (2014), Get wrecked : John Gollings and the Great Keppel Island campaign, Rockhampton, Queensland Rockhampton Art Gallery, ISBN 978-0-9586383-3-3
- Owen, Tony (2014), Liquid architecture, Architect Publications, ISBN 978-84-941915-4-1
- Hastings, Elizabeth Anne; Symond, John, 1947-, (writer of foreword,); Mairorana, Bart, (photographer.); Lopez, Geoff, (photographer.); Damkar, Mal Q., (photographer.); Kelvin Aitken Photography (photographer.); Christies Images Limited (photographer.); Fiora Sacco Photography (photographer.); Breathing Light Photography (photographer.); Hamilton Lund Photographer (photographer.); John Gollings Photography (photographer.); We Are Hobo Photography (photographer.) (4 December 2015), Wingadal, Roseville, [New South Wales] The Beagle Press (published 2015), ISBN 978-0-9942909-1-5
- RMIT Gallery (Melbourne, Vic.); Buckingham, Jon, (author,); Boydell, Eleanor, (interviewee.); Elmer, Deborah, (interviewee.); Flynn, Clare, (interviewee.); Hansen, Brigid, (interviewee.); Hernandez, Angela Marie, (interviewee.); Ng, Angela, (interviewee.); RMIT Gallery (Melbourne, Vic.) (host institution.) (2016), Quiddity, Melbourne, Victoria RMIT Gallery, ISBN 978-0-9925156-3-8
- Hulbert, Shane; Davies, Suzanne, ([writer of introduction],); RMIT Gallery (Melbourne, Vic.) (issuing body.) (2017), Photography 130 : behind the lens: 130 years of RMIT photography, Melbourne, Victoria RMIT Gallery, ISBN 978-0-9925156-5-2
- Fritz, John M; Michell, George, (author.); Gollings, John, (photographer.) (2017), Hampi Vijayanagara (Fourth Jaico impression ed.), Jaico Publishing House; London : Deccan Heritage Foundation, ISBN 978-81-8495-602-3
- Bruhn, Cameron, (editor,); Butler, Katelin, (editor,) (September 2018), The terrace house (Compact ed.), Thames & Hudson (published 2018), ISBN 978-1-76076-019-9
