= Sally Smart =

Australian artist (born 1960)

Sally Smart AM
- Born: 26 March 1960 (age 66); Quorn, South Australia, Australia
- Education: Victorian College of the Arts, University of Melbourne; South Australian School of Art, Adelaide
- Known for: Painting, collage, installation
- Notable work: The Log Dance (2012); Flauberts Puppets (2011); In Her Nature (2011)
- Awards: Redlands Westpac Art Prize, Sydney
- Website: sallysmart.com

Sally Jane Smart (born 29 March 1960) is an Australian contemporary artist known for her large-scale assemblage installations that incorporate a range of media, including felt cut-outs, painted canvas, drawings, screen-printing, printed fabric and photography, performance and video. Her art addresses gender and identity politics and questions the relationships between body and culture, including trans-national ideas that shaped cultural history. She has exhibited widely throughout Australia and internationally, and her works are held in major galleries in Australia and around the world.

== Early life and education ==
Smart was born in 1960, in Quorn, South Australia. Her great-aunt was Bessie Davidson, an Australian-born artist whose success in France in the first half of the twentieth century encouraged Smart in her determination to become an artist. Smart obtained a Diploma in Graphic Design from the South Australian School of Art, Adelaide in 1981, and completed a Post-graduate Diploma in Painting at the Victorian College of the Arts, Melbourne (1988), followed by a Master of Fine Arts in 1991, also at the Victorian College of the Arts.

== Work ==
Smart's early work reflected the influence of Collage in painting in Australian art during the 1980s. By the 1990s, "cutting and pasting ha[d] come to the fore" in Smart's work, and she was creating "composition[s] of cut-out shapes [that] meander[] over the walls".

The themes of gender and identity were central to Smart's work from the beginning. Her 1996/1997 work, The Unhomely Body, reflects in its title "the idea of something being unsettling because it contains the familiar rendered unfamiliar, through the emergence of what was previously suppressed. Here the domestic environment is acknowledged as the historical site of female confinement." In her work Femmage Shadows and Symptoms (1999 and later), Smart used the word femmage, created by feminist Miriam Schapiro, to explicitly link to historic traditions of women's making in many mediums and techniques, and feminist political discussions of such women's work, with this large-scale installation "creating a surrealistic, dream-like pattern in which the viewer can discover suggestive images that are likely to trigger memories of childhood impressions". In this work, the themes of the home and inner emotions were further developed and exposed, represented also by Smart dressing herself in a costume made up of women's internal body parts.

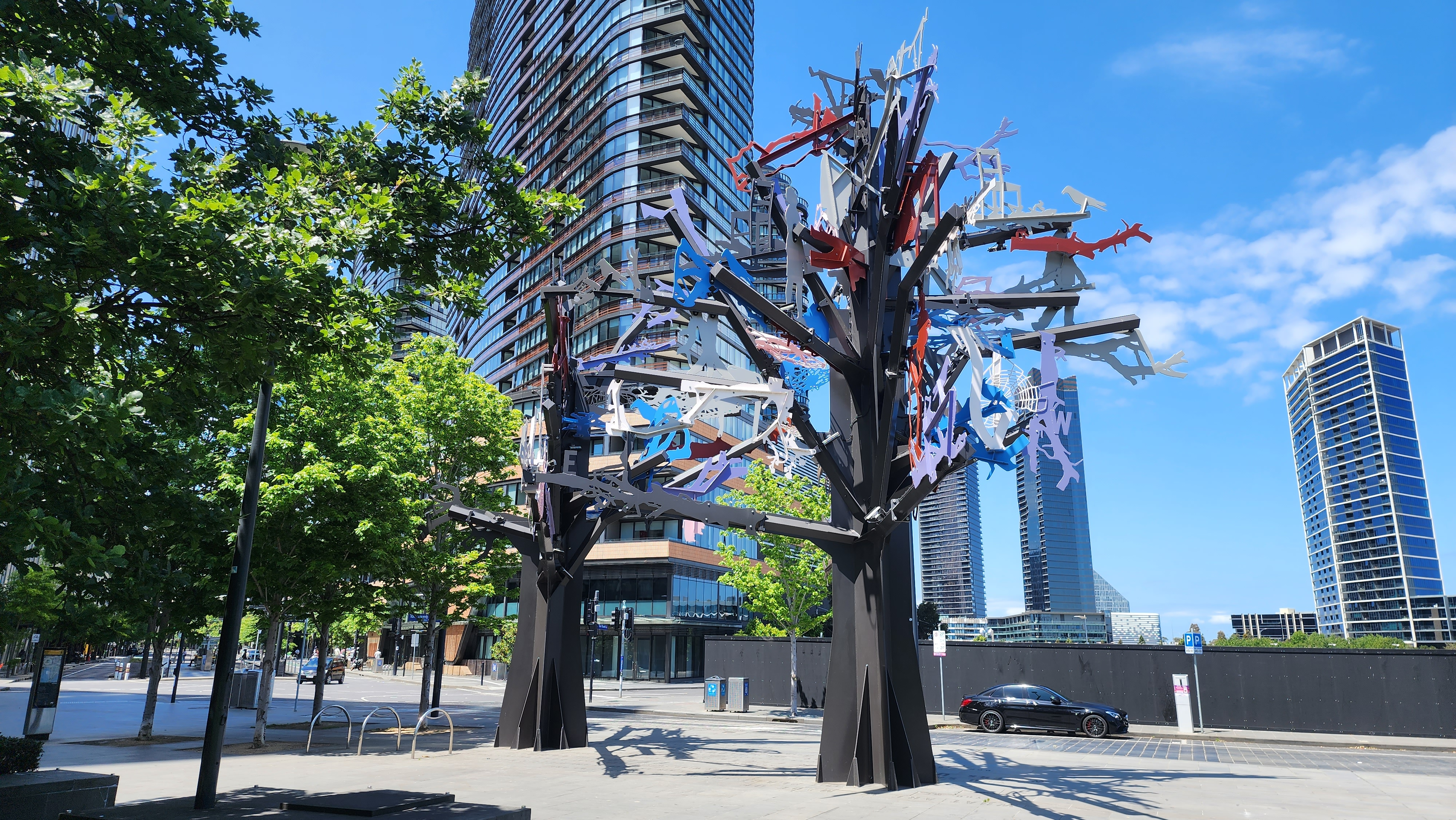
Shadow Trees in Melbourne

From 2006, Smart exhibited her Exquisite Pirate installation series internationally. One critic considered the name "a good analogy for Smart’s approach to making art", partly referencing the surrealist technique exquisite corpse, and also implying a strategy of breaking rules for profit, or, "In this case, for stunning visual invention, where phantasmagorical apparitions appear, wreak havoc and disappear into a sea of detail". Another reviewer perceived "a mass of fragments that are forever being reordered and rearranged to forge new meanings and modes of understanding .... Smart explores and eloquently articulates the complexities of these processes".

In her installations The Choreography of Cutting (The Pedagogical Puppet Projects) (2013-2018), Smart "investigat[es] .. three seemingly disparate topics: the historical Avant-Garde, traditional Indonesian folk art and the act of cutting", exploring links between the costume designs of the early 20th century Ballets Russes and traditional Javanese puppetry. Designs were digitally cut up and rearranged, quotes from Gertrude Stein, Pina Bausch, Rudolph von Laban and others were "metaphorically ... ‘cut’ from their original contexts" and "scrawled" over two walls, "us[ing] a process that necessitated the entire body: reaching, bending and moving across the length and height of the canvas: [Smart] has inevitably acted out the topic of investigation". Video works were also incorporated, choreographing puppets and shadows.

Hawker has described how Smart's "art reflects the subversive nature of the Avant-garde in women's art practice. Questions of gender and identity are key concerns in her work, and Smart seek particular inspiration from, and engages with, early twentieth-century innovative modernist women artists."

Smart has exhibited internationally, including at the Singapore Art Museum, Singapore; Wooyang Museum of Contemporary Art, Korea; Galeri Canna, Jakarta; Fukuoka Art Museum, Japan; Dark Heart: 2014 Adelaide Biennial of Australian Art, Art Gallery of South Australia, Adelaide; The Pedagogical Puppet Contemporary Galleries, University of Connecticut, USA; Herbert F. Johnson Museum of Art, Cornell University, New York; and Iberia Center for Contemporary Art, Beijing, China.

Smart lives and works Melbourne, Victoria.

== Recognition and awards ==
- Redlands Westpac Art Prize, Sydney (2004)
- Sackler Fellow Artist-in Residence, University of Connecticut, USA (2012)
- Australia Council Fellowship (2014)
- Vice-Chancellor’s Fellow at the University of Melbourne (2017)
- Member of the Order of Australia (2026) for significant service to the arts as an administrator, educator and visual artist.

== Other roles ==
- Trustee at the National Gallery of Victoria from 2001 to 2008.
- Board member (Deputy Chair) at the National Association for the Visual Arts (NAVA) from 2016 to 2019.

== Selected exhibitions ==
=== Solo exhibitions (selection) ===
Smart has exhibited extensively throughout Australia and internationally, including China, United States, Belgium, Hong Kong, Brazil, New Zealand, Spain and Japan.

- The Unhomely Body

- 1996, Contemporary Art Centre of South Australia, Adelaide, Australia
- 1997, Robert Lindsay Gallery, Melbourne, Australia

- Femmage Shadows and Symptoms

- 1999, Fukuoka Art Museum, Fukuoka, Japan
- 2001, G2 Gallery Auckland New Zealand
- 2010, McClelland Gallery + Sculpture Park, Langwarrin, Australia

- Shadow Farm

- 2000, Wollongong City Gallery, Wollongong
- 2000, Monash University Museum of Art, Melbourne
- 2001, Bendigo Art Gallery, Bendigo
- 2002, Bond University Gallery, Gold Coast
- 2002, Queensland University of Technology, Brisbane

- Family Tree House, 2001, Galeria Barro Senna Sao Paulo, Brazil
- Sally Smart, 2003, Kalli Rolfe Contemporary Art, Melbourne
- The Exquisite Pirate

- 2006, Postmasters Gallery, New York
- 2006, Greenaway Art Gallery, Adelaide
- 2006, Dangerous Waters: Cornell University, Herbert F. Johnson Museum of Art, Ithaca, New York
- 2007, Yawk, Yawk: 24HR Art, Darwin, NT, Australia
- 2007, North Sea: Ter Caemer-Meert Contemporary, Kortrijk, Belgium
- 2008, Installation, Scope Basel, Basel, Switzerland
- 2009, South China Sea: OV Gallery, Shanghai, China
- 2012, Purdy Hicks Gallery, London, UK

- Decoy Nest

- 2008, Postmasters Gallery, New York
- 2011, Greenaway Art Gallery, Melbourne, Australia

- Flaubert’s Puppets, 2011, Postmasters Gallery, New York, NY, USA
- Performativities (Work On Paper), 2011, Amelia Johnson Contemporary, Hong Kong, China
- The Log Dance (In Her Nature)

- 2011, Breenspace, Sydney, Australia
- 2012, ArtHK 2012, Amelia Johnson Contemporary, Hong Kong, China

- I Build My Time, 2012, Fehitly Contemporary, Melbourne, Australia
- Choreographing Collage, 2013, Breenspace Sydney, Australia
- The Choreography of Cutting (The Pedagogical Puppet Projects)

- 2013, Greenaway Art Gallery, Adelaide, Australia
- 2015, Purdy Hicks Gallery, London, UK
- 2016, Postmasters Gallery, New York
- 2017, Sarah Scout Presents, Melbourne, Australia
- 2018, Tony Raka Art Gallery, Ubud, and P.A.R.A.D.E. at BIASA, Kerobokan, Indonesia

- The Shadow Trees Sculpture Installation, 2014, Victoria Harbour, Docklands, Melbourne, Australia

=== Group exhibitions (selection) ===
- 2015–2016 Conversation: Endless Acts in Human History, National Gallery of Indonesia
- 2013 COLLECTIVE IDENTITY(IeS): THIS IS THAT TIME – Lake Macquarie City Art Gallery
- 2012 Contemporary Australia: Women – Gallery of Modern Art, Queensland
- 2002 Arid Arcadia: art of the Flinders Ranges, Art Gallery of South Australia
- 1998 Unhomely, Wooyang Museum of Contemporary Art, Korea

== Collections ==
- National Gallery of Australia, Canberra
- National Gallery of Victoria, Melbourne
- Art Gallery of South Australia, Adelaide
- GOMA/Queensland Art Gallery, Brisbane
- Museum of Contemporary Art, Sydney
- Auckland Art Gallery, Toi o Tamaki, Auckland, New Zealand
- Herbert F. Johnson Museum, Cornell University, New York, USA
- British Museum, London, UK
