= Casey Jenkins =

Australian performance artist

Casey Jenkins (born 1980) is an Australian performance artist based in Melbourne.

== Career ==
Jenkins became widely known in 2013, when her performance work Casting Off My Womb caused interest online for what was referred to as "vaginal knitting". Jenkins described the work as "in which I used skeins of wool lodged in my vaginal tunnel to knit a long passage, marking one full menstrual cycle", where she pared "concepts about body parts and activities related to women back to their most elemental." The work attracted abuse from online commentators, and inspired a follow-up work Programmed to Reproduce in 2016.

In 2019, Jenkins performed two works with her child Ottilie. In Drawn and Halved, performed at the Lapsody Festival in Helsinki, she created art with clay with one hand while caring for her child with her other. In The Artist Is Distracted, she extended the idea and included audience participation, with the audience invited to sit with Jenkins and her child who was then 17 months old.

In 2020, Jenkins announced plans to self-inseminate herself as part of an artwork titled Immaculate. The work was supported by funding from South Australia's Vitalstatistix and the Australia Council, but funding was cancelled after criticism towards the work. Initially, the funding was suspended while the Australia Council sought legal advice, but was officially rescinded soon after, with Australia Council CEO Adrian Collette writing to Jenkins that they "cannot be party to any act that could result in bringing a new life into the world...The possible current and longer-term consequences for the child, the child’s parent and the child’s donor are inappropriate for a corporate government entity to accept." In a public statement, they denied cancelling the funding due to negative media coverage.

Jenkins sued the Australia Council in 2021, and clarified that the artwork was a documentation of the process of self-insemination, and not the creation of a child, as she felt had been insinuated by the Australia Council. Previous to the controversy, Jenkins said she planned to conceive when she decided to turn it into an artwork. The case went to the Federal Court of Australia, but was settled out of court in 2023. As part of the settlement, Jenkins was awarded a six-figure sum and publicly apologised to.

Outside of her solo work, Jenkins is cofounder with Rayna Fahey of the craftivism group Craft Cartel which blends craft and activism. They were featured in the 2010 documentary Making It Handmade!

== Select work ==
- Casting Off My Womb (2013) at Darwin Visual Arts Association
- Body of Work (2015) at Dark Horse Experiment Gallery, Melbourne
- Programmed to Reproduce (2016) at Festival of Live Art
- Waste Note (2017) at SomoS, Berlin
- True Colours | True Colors (2019) at Dark Horse Experiment Gallery, Melbourne
- Immaculate (2020)
