= Archie Moore (artist) =

Australian artist

Archie Moore (born 1970) is an Aboriginal Australian multimedia artist. His installation kith and kin was exhibited in the Australian pavilion at the 2024 Venice Biennale winning the Golden Lion for Best National Participation.

== Early life and education ==
Archie Moore was born in 1970 at Toowoomba, Queensland. He is a Kamilaroi/Bigambul man, with an Aboriginal mother and a father of British descent.

In 1998 he graduated with a Bachelor of Visual Arts degree from Queensland University of Technology (QUT) in Brisbane.

== Art practice ==
Moore's work explores autobiographical themes, including exploration of his Aboriginal identity (looking at skin, language, smell, home, genealogy, flags), as well as Australian history. He examines understanding and misunderstanding between cultures, and racism. He works in many media. He has created paper sculptures, video art, and sound art, and has even worked with perfumer "to create smells that create memories", along with the more conventional forms such as painting, drawing, photography, textiles, sculpture, and site-specific installations.

He also enjoys exploring double entendres, puns, and other linguistic dualities.

== Career highlights ==
His 2016 installation A Home Away From Home (Bennelong/Vera's Hut), commissioned for the 20th Biennale of Sydney, is a full-scale replica of the small brick hut built for Wangal man Woollarawarre Bennelong in 1790 during the early years of the colonisation of Australia. Inside is a replica of his maternal grandmother Vera's home, with corrugated iron walls and a dirt floor.

In 2021, his Family Tree, a family tree drawn on a 16-foot (4.9 m) square piece of MDF using a white conté crayon and blackboard paint, was displayed in the solo exhibition entitled The Colour Line: Archie Moore & W.E.B. Du Bois at UNSW Galleries. The work includes many traditional Aboriginal names along with anglicised, derogatory, or other names assigned to Indigenous Australian people.

In 2022, Moore created Dwelling at Gertrude Contemporary in Melbourne. This consisted of several rooms containing memories of his childhood home.

=== 2024 Venice Biennale ===
In 2024 Moore presented a solo exhibition in the Australian pavilion at the 2024 Venice Biennale. The presentation was curated by Ellie Buttrose, Curator of Contemporary Australian Art at the Queensland Art Gallery & Gallery of Modern Art. The creative partnership won the chance to represent Australia via an open call for proposals. Moore is only the second Indigenous artist to solo-represent Australia in the event, after Tracey Moffatt in 2017. His work, entitled August 19, 2024, comprises another huge family tree drawn in chalk, mapping over 2,400 generations, and covering 60 m (200 ft) of wall space in the Australian pavilion. There are large gaps in the tree, where oral history was not passed down owing to the effects of colonisation, massacres, epidemics, and natural disasters. The chart was created on the walls and ceiling of the pavilion, which are traditionally white, but now covered in blackboard paint.

Completing the installation are hundreds of piles of documents arranged on a table in the centre of the room, containing official proceedings of inquests into Indigenous deaths in state care since that have occurred since 1991, the year the Royal Commission into Aboriginal Deaths in Custody report was published, as well as 19 documents relating to members of the artist's family who had come into contact with former policies. These include reports by the Queensland Protector of Aboriginals, who would not grant exemption to Moore's grandparents from the restrictive Aboriginals Protection and Restriction of the Sale of Opium Act 1897, that controlled the movements, financial control, and the right to marry of Aboriginal people. The process of creating the family tree on the walls took two months for Moore and three collaborators to complete. He said "it was important to have this large scale [work] to give a sense of time and unbroken continuing culture even though there's these three holes in the tree, which are disruptions to the genealogical lineage".

On 20 April 2024 it was announced that Moore was the winner of the Golden Lion award for Best National Participation. On 19 August 2024 it was announced that kith and kin had been jointly acquired by the Australian Government for Queensland Art Gallery and the Tate in the U.K. Because of its size, kith and kin was acquired as a set of artist instructions rather than the physical installation, so it can co-exist at both Tate and Queensland Art Gallery without incurring any additional shipping, conservation, or storage costs.

=== Other work ===
In May 2026, Moore's work Remnants of My Father, in which remnants relating to his father's life are set in gold, was displayed in the Adelaide Biennial in the Museum of Economic Botany in the Adelaide Botanic Garden.

== Music ==
Moore is also lead singer in a metal band called Eggvein (rendered Σgg√e|n), adopting the stage name stage name Magnus O'Pus.

== Recognition and awards ==
Curator, artist, and author Djon Mundine has written extensively about Moore, referring to him as a "night parrot", a rarely-sighted bird.

- 2001: Anne & Gordon Samstag International Visual Arts Scholarship, enabling study at the Academy of Fine Arts in Prague, Czech Republic
- 2013: University of Queensland's National Artists' Self-Portrait Prize, for "Black Dog" – a taxidermied dog, blackened by shoe polish
- 2018: Creative Industries Faculty Outstanding Alumni Award by QUT
- 2024: Chosen to represent Australia in the 2024 Venice Biennale
- 2024: Winner, Golden Lion award for Best National Participation at the Venice Biennale

== Selected exhibitions ==
- 2018: Archie Moore: 1970-2018, curated by Angela Goddard, Griffith University Art Museum, Brisbane
- 2021: The Colour Line: Archie Moore & W.E.B. Du Bois, curated by José Da Silva, UNSW Galleries, Sydney
- 2022: Dwelling (Victorian Issue), at Gertrude Contemporary Art Spaces, Melbourne
- 2022-23: Embodied Knowledge: Queensland Contemporary Art, curated by Ellie Buttrose and Katina Davidson, Queensland Art Gallery, Brisbane
- 2024: Dwelling (Adelaide Issue), an installation at the Samstag Museum of Art in Adelaide, the 5th iteration of the work based on memories of his childhood bedroom, created in collaboration with filmmaker Molly Reynolds under the auspices of the Adelaide Film Festival
- 2026: Remnants of My Father selected for Adelaide Biennale: Yield Strength curated by Ellie Buttrose
