= Natalie King =

Australian curator (born 1966)

Natalie King OAM
- Born: 1966 (age 59–60); Melbourne, Australia
- Occupations: Curator, writer
- Years active: 1991–present
- Known for: Australian Contemporary Art

Natalie King OAM (born 1966) is an Australian curator and writer working in Melbourne, Australia. She specialises in Australian and international programs for contemporary art and visual culture; exhibitions, publications, workshops, lectures and cultural partnerships across contemporary art and indigenous culture.

King was formerly Chief Curator of Melbourne Biennial Lab, the Creative Associate of MPavilion and curator for Tracey Moffatt for the Australian Pavilion at the 57th Venice Biennale 2017.

Since 2017, she has been a senior research fellow at the Victorian College of the Arts, University of Melbourne, Australia and was recently appointed to the role of enterprise professor at the VCA. In that role she was named in The Australian Financial Review 100 Women of Influence awards for Arts, Culture and Sport in October 2018. In September 2019, King was appointed as curator of the first Pacific and transgender artist, Yuki Kihara, to represent Aotearoa New Zealand at the 59th Venice Biennale 2022.

== Early life ==
Natalie King grew up in North Balwyn, Melbourne Victoria, in a conventional Jewish household. From a young age she had an interest in the indigenous history of the city, including the work of Aboriginal artist Destiny Deacon and long-time collaborator Virginia Fraser.

== Education ==
King completed a Master of Arts (M.A.), Visual Arts & Museum Studies at Monash University in Victoria Australia, between 1991 and 1993.

== Career ==
=== Venice Biennale ===
Natalie King's curatorships include Tracey Moffatt's exhibition for the Australian pavilion at the 57th Venice Biennale 2017; for the first Pasifika and Samoan artist, Yuki Kihara for the New Zealand pavilion at the 59th Venice Biennale 2022; and in 2024, the inaugural Timor-Leste pavilion, Maria Madeira: Kiss and Don’t Tell at the 60th Venice Biennale 2024.

=== Other institutions and projects ===
King's previous roles include Chief Curator of Melbourne Biennial Lab, City of Melbourne; senior research fellow, Victorian College of the Arts, The University of Melbourne and Creative Associate of MPavilion.

== Awards ==
In 2018, Natalie King was selected as a finalist for the Australian Financial Review 100 Women of Influence, an award established to recognise the achievements of Australian women across a broad range of professions and disciplines.

In the 2020 Queen's Birthday Honours, King was awarded the Medal of the Order of Australia (OAM) for "service to the contemporary visual arts".

In 2023 King won the Best Artist-Led Publication AWAPA award by the Art Association of Australia & New Zealand for editing the publication Paradise Camp by Yuki Kihara. (Thames and Hudson, 2022)

Her 2024 book, The Art of Kaylene Whiskey, won the Illustrated Book of the Year at the 2026 Australian Book Industry Awards.

== Publications ==
King was co-editor (with Professor Larissa Hjorth and Mami Kataoka) of the anthology Art in the Asia Pacific: Intimate Publics, Routledge, 2014; editor/curator of Up Close: Carol Jerrems with Larry Clark, Nan Goldin and William Yang, Heide Museum of Modern Art; and co-editor of a publication on biennial curator Hou Hanru. Widely published in arts media including LEAP, Photofile and Flash Art, she is a member of the International Association of Art Critics, Paris.

- Shadowlife, curated by Djon Mundine and Natalie King, Asialink, 2012, ISBN 9780734047571
- Destiny Deacon: Walk & don't look blak, curated by Natalie King, Museum of Contemporary Art, 2004, ISBN 1875632972
- Up Close: Carol Jerrems with Larry Clark, Nan Goldin and William Yang, Edited by Natalie King, 31 August 2010 ISBN 9781863955010
- Jitish Kallat: Circa, edited by Natalie King and Bala Starr, University of Melbourne, 2012, ISBN 9780734048226
- Shadowlife, curated by Djon Mundine and Natalie King, Asialink, 2012, ISBN 9780734047571
- Hou Hanru, edited by Natalie King and Victoria Lynn, University of Melbourne, 2013, ISBN 9780734048875
- Whisper in my mask: TarraWarra Biennial 2014, edited by Natalie King and Djon Mundine, TarraWarra, 2014, ISBN 9780980540871
- Tracey Moffatt: My Horizon, by Natalie King, Thames & Hudson, 1 May 2017 ISBN 9780500501078
- The art of Kaylene Whiskey: do you believe in love? Edited by Natalie King, Thames & Hudson, 2024, ISBN 9781760764494

== Select exhibition curatorships ==
- 2024, Kiss and Don’t Tell, Timor Leste (Democratic Republic of) Pavilion, 60th Venice Biennale, Venice
- 2022, Paradise Camp, Yuki Kihara, New Zealand, 59th Venice Biennale, Venice
- 2017, My Horizon: Tracey Moffatt, Australian Pavilion, 57th Venice Biennale, Venice
- 2016, Monyet Gila: Episode One – The Episode with the Crazy Monkey, Contemporary Asian Art, Sydney, co-curated with Mikala Tai
- 2016, Melbourne Biennial Lab: What happens now?, Melbourne Festival
- 2016, Conversations: Endless Acts in Human History, Entang Wiharso and Sally Smart, National Gallery of Indonesia, Jakarta, co-curated with Suwarno Wisetrotomo
- 2014, One Night Stand: Slow Art Collective & The Telepathy Project, MPavilion, Melbourne
- 2014, Whisper in My Mask: TarraWarra Biennial 2014 (with Djon Mundine), TarraWarra Museum of Art, Victoria
- 2014, Episodes: Australian Photography Now 13th Dong Gang International Photo Festival 2014, Dong Gang Museum of Photography, Korea
- 2013, Jitish Kallat: Circa, Ian Potter Museum of Art, Melbourne, co-curated with Bala Starr and Andrew Jamieson
- 2012, Shadowlife (with Djon Mundine), Bangkok Arts & Cultural Centre; Kaohsiung Museum of Fine Arts, Taiwan; Nanyang Academy of Fine Art, Singapore; Bendigo Art Gallery, Victoria
- 2012, Gigi Scaria: Prisms of Perception, Ian Potter Museum of Art, Melbourne, co-curated with Bala Starr
- 2010, Up Close: Carol Jerrems with Larry Clark, Nan Goldin & William Yang, Heide Museum of Modern Art, Melbourne
- 2004, Destiny Deacon: Walk & don’t look blak, Adam Art Gallery, Wellington; Tjibaou Cultural Centre, New Caledonia; Tokyo Metropolitan Museum of Photography, Japan and Ian Potter Museum of Art, Melbourne, Museum of Contemporary Art, Sydney
- 2004, Supernatural Artificial, Tokyo Metropolitan Museum of Photography, Japan
- 1999, aero-zone, Rosemary Laing, National Museum of Art, Osaka, Australian Centre for Contemporary Art, Melbourne
- 1998, September: co-curation with Naomi Cass; Haimish, Jewish Museum of Australia, St Kilda
- 1994, Primavera 1994: Young Australian Artists, Museum of Contemporary Art, Sydney
- 1994, December–January: Bad Toys Australlan Centre for Contemporary Art, Dallas Brooks Drive, South Yarra
- 1994, December: co-curation with Zara Stanhope of Tableaux, featuring Maria Kozic, Howard Arkley, Peter Booth, Tim McGuire, Brent Harris, Jan Nelson, Phillip Hunter, David Stephenson, Tim Jones, Jon Campbell. Monash University Gallery

== Selected interviews ==
Natalie King has conducted a number of public lectures and published interviews with leading international artists and curators including:

- Curator Natalie King on her new role as Enterprise Professor at the VCA, The University of Melbourne, 2018
- Pipilotti Rist – artist (Switzerland), 8 January 2018
- Tracey Moffatt – artist (Australia), 1 September 2017
- Maria Alyokhina – a founding member of Pussy riot (Russia), 17 August 2017
- Entang Wiharso and Sally Smart – artists (Australia), 20 January 2016
- Interview with Raqs Media Collective, Boiler Room Lecture, State Library of Victoria, Melbourne, 2015
- Falling back to Earth: Cai Guo-Qiang, Art and Australia, 2014, pp. 508–513
- Interview with Hou Hanru, Asialink, University of Melbourne, 2013
- A Human Texture: The video portraits of Candice Breitz, Art and Australia, Vol 51 No 2, Summer 2013, pp. 191–5
- Polixeni Papapetrou – artist (Australia), 2013
- Bill Henson – artist (Australia), 2011
- The Material of meaning: Illuminating the art of Joseph Kosuth, Art and Australia, Vol. 47, No. 4, Winter 2010, pp. 590–595
- Anastasia Klose – artist (Australia), 2009
- Interview with Carolyn Christov-Bakargiev, Flash Art, May–June 2008, p. 86
- Interview with Ai Weiwei, Art and Australia, Vol. 45 No. 4, 2008, pp. 546–549
- Interview with Massimiliano Gioni, Art and Australia, Vol. 45, No. 2, Summer 2007, pp. 274–9
