= Ivan Rijavec =

Australian architect (born 1951)

Ivan Rijavec (born 1951) is a Slovenian-born Australian architect. He studied architecture at the Western Australian Institute of Technology in Perth, the Architectural Association in London, and RMIT in Melbourne, graduating in 1979.

Emerging as a solo practitioner by 1990, his work frequently included complex curving geometries in three dimensions, and was nominated for various awards.

In 1992 he designed a new facilities and entry building for the Fitzroy Pool, which was a finalist in the AIA awards the next year. Notable projects include the Alessio house, Templestowe (1997), which won the Dulux Colour Award in 2000, and the Chen House, Kew (1998), which was a finalist in the AIA awards that year, both featuring complex curved planning and surfaces.

About 2001, Rijavek was the architect for a large apartment project in Fitzroy bounded by Napier, Kerr, Young and Argyle Streets known as NKYA, and also known as 'the cheesegrater' after the cone-shaped element on one corner. The project was controversial for its scale, opposed by the local Council, publicly supported by the architect, and subject to challenges and delays. It was not finally completed until about 2012.

Along with photographer John Gollings, Rijavec was one of the Creative Directors for Australia for the 2010 Venice Biennale of Architecture.
