= Locked Up =

Locked Up may refer to:

- "Locked Up" (song), by hip hop/R&B artist Akon
- Locked Up: A Mother's Rage, a 1991 TV movie
- Locked Up (TV series), a Spanish television series, originally titled Vis a vis
- "Locked Up!", an episode of the television series Victorious
- "Locked Up", a song by Lil Durk from the album Love Songs 4 the Streets 2

== See also ==
- Imprisonment
- Lock up (disambiguation)
- Locked Up Abroad, a British docudrama television series, originally titled Banged Up Abroad
