= Jefa Greenaway =

Australia-born indigenous architect

Jefa Greenaway is an Australia-born indigenous architect. He is the director of Greenaway Architects and a lecturer at the University of Melbourne. He is also a co-founder of several organizations intended to support Indigenous peoples pursuing a career in design.

== Early life and education ==
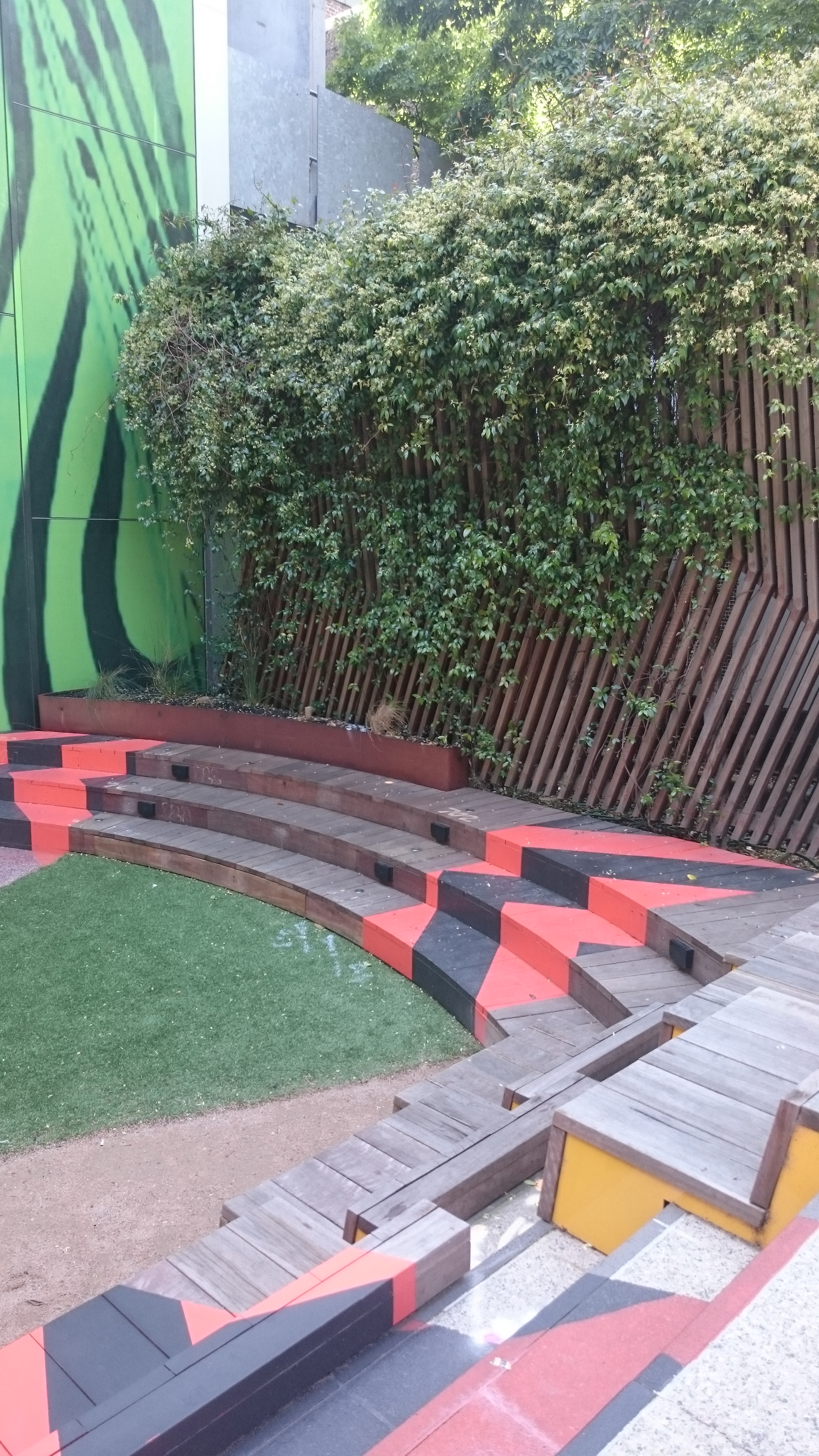
Greenaway designed this art installation at the Royal Melbourne Institute of Technology.

Greenaway was born on the Gadigal lands in Sydney. His father Bert Groves, who died when he was a baby, was an Indigenous civil rights activist, and he was raised in Australia by his mother of German ancestry.

He received his bachelor's degree at La Trobe University and studied architecture at Melbourne University, where he was the only Indigenous person in his class.

== Career ==
Greenaway founded his firm Greenaway Architects with his wife Catherine Drosinos. Originally only working on projects for residential areas, he focuses on public projects. He co-founded the Indigenous Architecture and Design Australia nonprofit to support Aboriginal Australians in pursuit of design. Greenaway also co-wrote the International Indigenous Design Charter which intends to blend indigenous knowledge with commercial design.
