= The Lock-Up =

Public art gallery in Newcastle, Australia

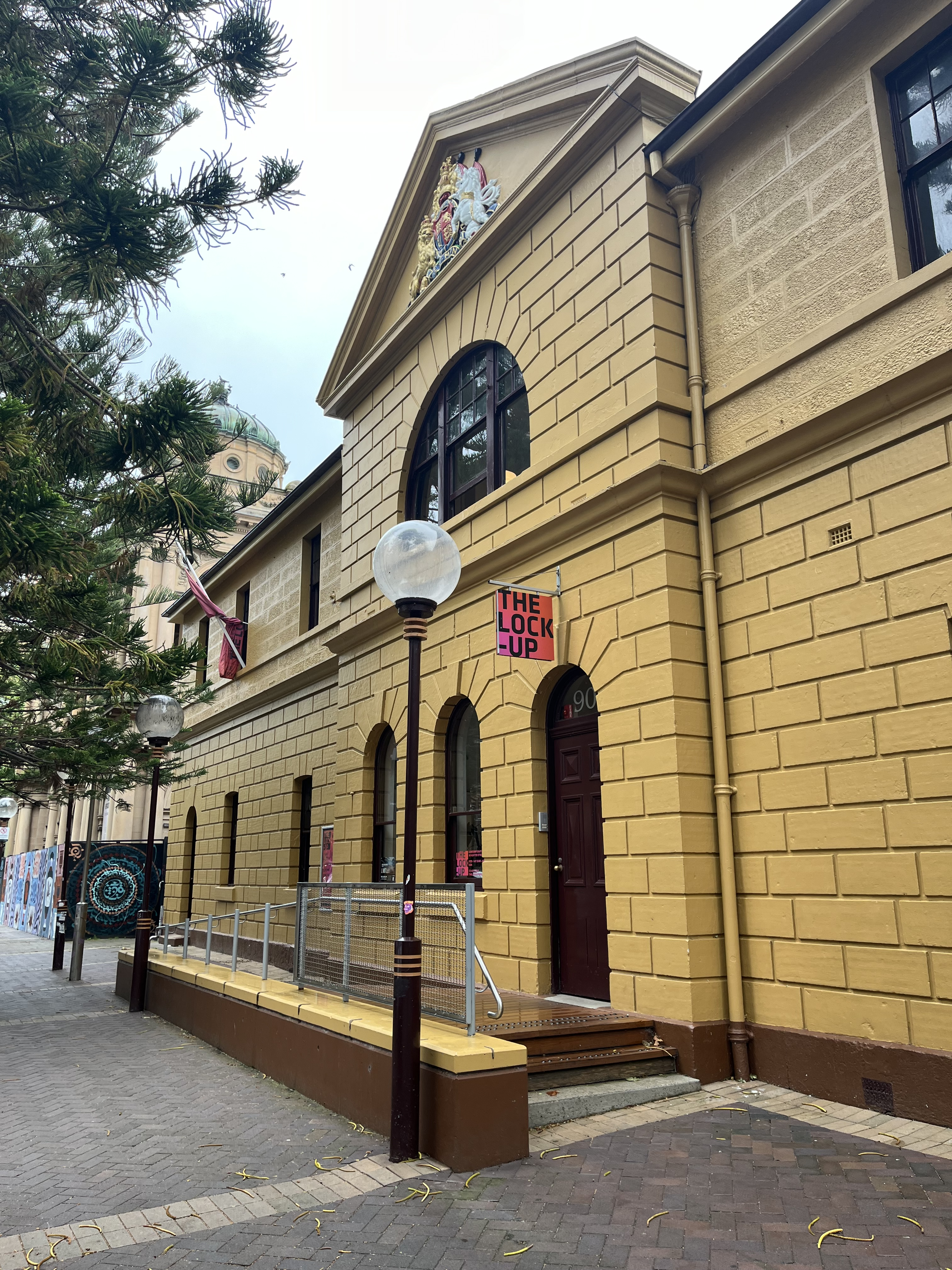
- The Lock-Up in 2024
- Established: 2014
- Location: 90 Hunter St, Newcastle, New South Wales, Australia
- Coordinates: 32°55′39″S 151°47′02″E
- Type: Art gallery
- Director: Alexandra Pedley
- Website: thelockup.org.au

The Lock-Up is a public art gallery in Newcastle, New South Wales, Australia. The gallery is located in a former police station and holding cells, which is listed on the New South Wales State Heritage Register.

== History ==
From 1861 until 1982, the building used for The Lock-Up operated as a police station and holding cells for short-term prisoners. After the police station closed, the site became the Hunter Heritage Centre in 1988, which included a museum and an art gallery. The space was re-launched as The Lock-Up in September 2014, as a dedicated multidisciplinary contemporary art gallery.

The building is listed on the New South Wales State Heritage Register.

== Description and governance ==
The exhibition spaces include several cells, a padded cell, an indoor exercise yard for prisoners, and a considerable amount of graffiti created by prisoners, all of which have been maintained in their original form following its conversion into an art gallery.

The Lock-Up is a not-for-profit independent gallery. The gallery receives around $150,000 funding a year from Create NSW, and receives additional support from a patrons program. In 2023, they received a $400,000 grant from Creative Australia, with funds to be provided over four years beginning in 2025. Funds are also raised via an annual exhibition titled Collect.

== Exhibitions and programs ==
The gallery typically runs about six or seven shows a year, usually with original installations, and also supports an artist-in-residence program. Art at the gallery has often been social and criminal justice themed, including on issues such as the climate crisis and the Royal Commission into Institutional Responses to Child Sexual Abuse.

Performative exhibitions have featured at the gallery, including one which incorporated the original graffiti by exploring the characters of "Sue and Dyan", whose names are carved into the walls of one of the cells.

Their 2018 exhibition, justiceINjustice, a collaboration between artists and lawyers which focused on miscarriage of justice, won an IMAGinE award from the Museums and Galleries of NSW. Then director Jessi England also received the IMAGinE award for best director that same year.

Notable artists exhibited at The Lock-Up include Blak Douglas, and Khaled Sabsabi, who was artist-in-residence and displayed work at the gallery from September to November 2024.
