= Lock-up provision =

In corporate finance, a lock-up provision is a contractual term that prohibits a shareholder from selling company stock for a period of time known as the lock-up period.

Lock-up provisions are commonly used to restrict pre-IPO shareholders from selling their shares once the company has been taken public so as to maintain the value of the stock.

== See also ==
- Crown jewel lock-up
- Poison pill
- Mergers and acquisitions
