= Chalkboard paint =

Paint that creates a chalkboard-style surface

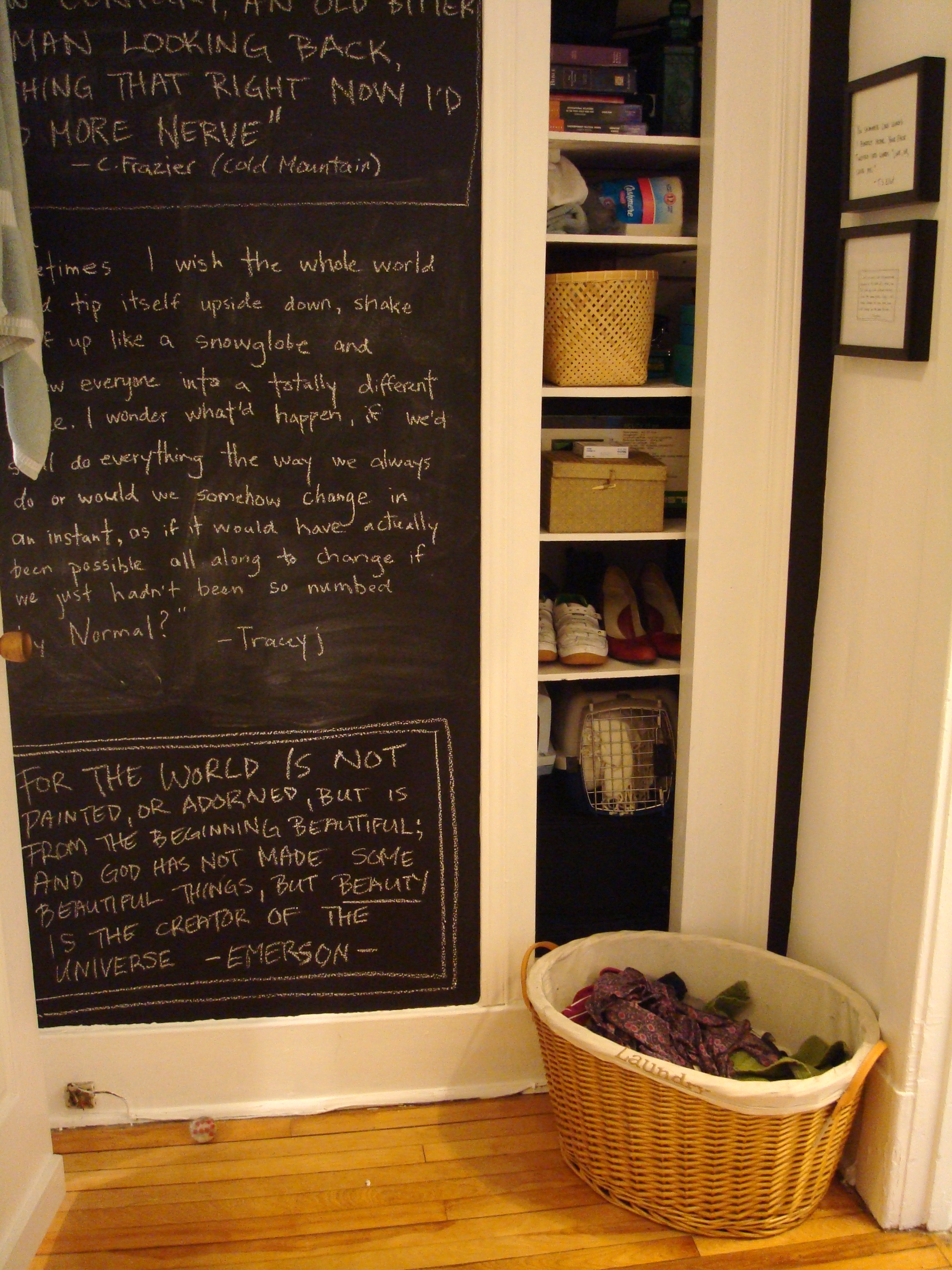
A chalkboard-painted wall surface

Chalkboard paint is a specialized paint that creates a chalkboard-like coating that can be utilized as a writing surface in the same manner as a traditional chalkboard. Chalkboard paint is commonly made out of a mixture of talc, acrylic, water, glycol, titanium dioxide, carbon black, opacifiers, silica, and esters. It may also contain acetone, propane, butane, xylene, ethylbenzene, amorphous silica, n-butyl acetate, and propylene glycol methyl ether acetate which are industrial standard ingredients used in inks and paints as thinners, olfactory, and pigmentation agents.
