= Gertrude Contemporary =

Gallery and studios in Melbourne, Australia

Coordinates: 37°48′23″S 144°58′52″E

Gertrude comprises two contemporary art spaces in Melbourne, Australia: Gertrude Contemporary (formerly known as 200 Gertrude Street) and Gertrude Glasshouse. Established in 1983 at 200 Gertrude Street under founding director Louise Neri, Gertrude Contemporary moved to its current site in Preston South in 2021. Gertrude Glasshouse, a satellite venue in Collingwood, was opened in 2016. As of June 2026, Tracy Burgess is executive director and Mark Feary is artistic director of Gertrude.

== History ==
Gertrude Contemporary was established in 1983 as series of artist studios at 200 Gertrude Street, Fitzroy, in a converted textile factory, under the name of 200 Gertrude Street. Journalist Virginia Trioli assisted founding director Louise Neri in its establishment. In 1985 it became Australia's first combined gallery and studio complex, a model it continues to operate today. From the outset the organisation was dedicated to the production and presentation of experimental and contemporary art.

In October 2014 it was announced that Gertrude were going to move to a new home in Johnston Street, at the site of the old Collingwood Technical School. Circus Oz and the Melba Spiegeltent were already established at the site, which was being transformed into an arts hub. However, it did not make this move, moving instead in May 2021 into a purpose-built space in Preston South. Its last exhibition at the Gertrude Street site was The End of Time. The Beginning of Time, which paid homage to the history of the old site. Mark Feary was artistic director at the time of the move.

Gertrude Glasshouse, the organisation's satellite venue, opened at 44 Glasshouse Road, Collingwood, in 2016, in a converted 1940s red brick warehouse, designed by SIBLING Architecture.

In July 2017, Gertrude Contemporary relocated its primary venue to 21-31 High Street, Preston South, converting a furniture warehouse into a combined studio and gallery complex.

== Location and description ==
Gertrude Contemporary, also known simply as Gertrude, has its main location at 21-31 High St, Preston South. It also has a satellite exhibition space, Gertrude Glasshouse, at 44 Glasshouse Rd, Collingwood.

Gertrude Contemporary's programs include exhibitions across the two gallery sites, studio residencies for local and international artists, and education and public programs. The Gertrude Contemporary Studio Program hosts 16 artists for a period of two years.

== People ==
Louise Neri was founding director of the gallery. Alexie Glass-Kantor was director and curator from 2007 until late 2013. Emma Crimming was director in 2014.

Previous chairs of the Gertrude board have included Virginia Trioli, who had been involved in its founding (appointed May 2015) and artist Jon Campbell was chair (as of 2022).

As of June 2026, Tracy Burgess is executive director, and also acts as secretary to the Gertrude board. Mark Feary is artistic director and Brigid Moriarty is curator of Gertrude. Artist Callum Morton has been chair of the board since his appointment in 2022 or 2023.

Mark Feary has been announced as curator of the 2028 Adelaide Biennial at the Art Gallery of South Australia.

== Residencies ==
Artist Richard Lewer was artist-in-residence at Gertrude Contemporary from 2008 until 2010.
