= Levante (hosiery) =

- Company type: Stockings
- Industry: Lingerie
- Founded: 1969; 57 years ago
- Headquarters: Castel Goffredo, Italy
- Products: Hosiery

Levante, located in Castel Goffredo, Italy, is a manufacturer of hosiery.

== History ==
Levante was founded in 1969, but began the business in the year of 1991.

== Description ==
The company manufactures and distributes hosiery, socks, and body wear. The products are exclusively distributed through Australia and New Zealand.
