= Creative Australia =

Government arts funding body

- Founded: 1968
- Founder: Government of Australia
- Type: Cultural institution
- Purpose: Promoting creative arts in Australia
- Region served: Australia
- Key people: Adrian Collette AM CEO; Wesley Enoch AM (interim chair)
- Website: creative.gov.au/australia

Creative Australia, formerly known as the Australia Council for the Arts and the Australia Council, is the country's official arts council, serving as an arts funding and advisory body for the Government of Australia.

The council was announced in 1967 as the Australian Council for the Arts, with the first members appointed the following year. It was made a statutory corporation by the passage of the Australia Council Act 1975. It became the Australia Council in 2013, and then Creative Australia, with a new organisational structure, from 24 August 2023.

The organisation has included several boards within its structure over the years, including more than one incarnation of a Visual Arts Board (VAB), in the 1970s–80s and in the early 2000s.

== History ==
Prime Minister Harold Holt announced the establishment of a national arts council in November 1967, modelled on similar bodies in Canada, the United Kingdom and the United States. It was one of his last major policy announcements prior to his death the following month. In June 1968, Holt's successor John Gorton announced the first ten members of the council, which was initially known as the Australian Council for the Arts. Economist H. C. Coombs became the first chairman of the body, while the other members included radio quizmaster Barry Jones, school principal Betty Archdale, magazine editor and state Liberal MP Peter Coleman, socialite Virginia Erwin (wife of federal Liberal MP Dudley Erwin), architect Karl Langer, author Geoffrey Dutton, theatre producer Jeana Bradley, arts patron Mary Houghton, and retired academic Kay Masterman.

The council issued its first grants in December 1968, which were distributed via the Australian Elizabethan Theatre Trust as the council did not yet have its own financial apparatus. Gorton stated that the council "had adopted a principle widely accepted [...] that high standards can best be achieved by a concentration of available funds, rather than by a thin spread over a wide area". The council subsequently received criticism from smaller professional and semi-professional companies, leading to the establishment of an Arts Special Projects Fund to assist smaller organisations. In December 1969, Coombs announced a new formula for grants whereby organisations could only receive a maximum of two-thirds of their budget from the council.

In February 1973, Prime Minister Gough Whitlam announced a new structure for the council whereby funding recommendations would be made by seven autonomous boards for different areas of the arts. Later that year, the council produced a report recommending that it be established as a statutory corporation.

=== Aboriginal Arts Board (1973) ===
The Aboriginal Arts Board (AAB) was created in 1973. Comprising Aboriginal Australian artists, writers and performers, its purpose was "to stimulate Indigenous Australian arts and lead to the preservation of many art forms almost lost since the settlement of Australia by Europeans". Dick Roughsey was the inaugural head of the board, followed by Yolngu artist and activist Wandjuk Marika. One of its earliest activities was the hosting of a seminar called Aboriginal Arts in Australia at the Australian National University, with around 800 attendees, with the intention of working out how government could best support Aboriginal culture and art in the future.

When created, AAB had similar aims as the Aboriginal Publications Foundation (APF), leading to some duplication of work by the two bodies. From mid-1975, promotional work carried out by the APF was put under the control of the AAB, while the APF became a referral body for the AAB. The APF was wound down, with its main responsibility the publication of the quarterly journal Identity until its closure in 1982.

The Australia Council became the biggest consumer of Aboriginal art, as there was not much interest in it during those years. Works were bought directly from artists, and often sent to galleries in the US and Canada.

The Board was later renamed the Aboriginal and Torres Strait Islander Arts Board or ATSIA Board, and is as of July 2021 the ATSIA Panel.

=== Change of name (1975) ===
After being given statutory authority in March 1975 by the Australia Council Act under the Whitlam government, it was renamed to Australia Council. The Council then incorporated other government projects, such as the Commonwealth Literary Fund and the Commonwealth Art Advisory Board.

The Visual Arts Board (VAB) existed during the 1970s and mid-1980s.

In 1978, the Australia Council began managing and supporting the national representation in the Australia Pavilion in the Venice Biennale.

=== 21st century ===
The Visual Arts/Craft Board was renamed the Visual Arts Board around 2007–8.

The Council's operations were independently reviewed in 2012, and the Australia Council Act 2013 (the Act) commenced on 1 July 2013.

In early 2014 federal Arts Minister George Brandis and Minister for Communications Malcolm Turnbull told artists at the Sydney Biennale that they were ungrateful and selfish to protest about the role of Transfield in the Nauru immigration detention centre. In December 2014, Brandis withdrew a large portion of literature funding from Australia Council.

In May 2015, Brandis cut $26 million a year for four years from Australia Council arts funding, a third of its arts funding, receiving significant criticism from the arts community. The money was reallocated to a new program, the National Program for Excellence in the Arts (NPEA). NPEA in turn was criticised by many artists and arts organisations for lacking the "arms-length" funding principles that had applied to the relationship between the government and Australia Council since its inception in the 1970s. These principles have traditionally had bipartisan support. Brandis was criticised previously for giving Melbourne classical music record label Melba Recordings a $275,000 grant outside of the usual funding and peer-assessment processes. Brandis's changes to funding arrangements, including the quarantining of the amount received by Australia's 28 major performing arts companies, were widely seen to disadvantage the small-to-medium arts sector and independent artists.

Following Malcolm Turnbull's successful spill of the leadership of the Liberal party in September 2015, Brandis was replaced as arts minister by Mitch Fifield. In November Fifield gave back $8 million a year for four years to Australia Council, changed the NPEA to the Catalyst Fund, and stressed it would have a focus on smaller arts projects. The arts community was not impressed by the changes.

As a result of the reduced funding, Australia Council cancelled project funding rounds for small groups and individuals in 2015 and then cut funding to over 60 arts organisations across the country in May 2016. Small arts organisations such as the Contemporary Art Centre of South Australia (CACSA), Leigh Warren & Dancers and many others were affected, forcing them to contract, merge or make drastic changes to their programs.

In 2019, the Australia Council took over the commissioning of works for the Venice Biennale, which it does by open call for proposals. The final selection is made by five independent experts, who first shortlist of six artists before selecting the successful candidate.

==== Revive national cultural policy (2023) ====
The Australia Council Act 2013 was amended by the Australia Council Amendment (Creative Australia) Act 2023, by which instrument the new name and organisational structure was created on 24 August 2023, described as "an expanded and modernised Australia Council". The number of board members was doubled from 12 to 24, but it continues to be known as the Australia Council Board. Councils for Music Australia and Creative Workplaces (for the Centre for Art and Entertainment Workplaces, as mentioned in the National Cultural Policy – Revive: a place for every story, a story for every place, created 30 January 2023) were created.

The Music Australia Council was appointed by Arts Minister Tony Burke in August 2023, consisting of eight members. The new legislation establishing this division came into effect on 24 August 2023.

The Creative Workplaces Council was announced on 11 August 2023 and commenced in their roles on Thursday 24 August 2023.

Still to follow (not included in the 2023 legislation) are the First Nations-led Board and Writers Australia, as outlined in the National Cultural Policy and the "Corporate Plan 2023–27".

In July 2024, the Creative Australia Amendment (Implementation of Revive) Act 2024 created First Nations Arts and Writing Australia, which would be on equal footing with Creative Workplaces and Music Australia. This is the final piece of legislation in establishing all the functions of Creative Australia under the National Cultural Policy, Revive.

The First Nations Board members were announced in September 2024. The Act also establishes Writing Australia, due to commence on 1 July 2025.

In May 2025, the chair of the agency, Robert Morgan, stepped aside in favour of his deputy, playwright Wesley Enoch, as an interim replacement.

== Function and governance ==
Creative Australia is the Australian Government's principal arts funding and advisory body. Its purpose is to promote and invest in Australian arts. It is "accountable to the Australian Parliament, and to the Government through the Minister for the Arts".

=== People ===
Adrian Collette AM became CEO of the Australia Council in January 2019 and remains in the position as CEO of Creative Australia as of October 2023. He was formerly chief executive of Opera Australia.

Sam Walsh AO was appointed chair of the Australia Council in 2016. In July 2021, Robert Morgan was appointed chair. Morgan has a degree in economics, and had been head of Australia's largest advertising and marketing business, Clemenger Group, but is also passionate about the arts, and was a member of the board of Opera Australia for over 10 years.

Since 24 August 2023 and as of October 2023, Robert Morgan is the chair and Wesley Enoch AM deputy chair of Creative Australia.

== Divisions ==
=== Creative Workplaces ===
Creative Workplaces aims to enable fair, safe, and respectful workplaces for artists, art workers, and arts organisations It provides information and resources about pay and workplace safety. The Creative Workplaces council is headed by Victorian human rights lawyer and commissioner Kate Jenkins.

=== Music Australia ===
The Music Australia Council was appointed in August 2023, consisting of eight members:

- Gordi, the folktronica singer-songwriter
- Mama Kin, aka Danielle Caruana, a solo artist, co-founder of The Seed Fund
- Fred Leone, the Butchulla songman
- Michael Chugg, music promoter
- Petrina Convey, owner of UNITY Mgmt. Group
- Nathan McLay, founder and CEO of independent label and management company Future Classic
- Fred Alale AM, co-founder and chair of African Music and Cultural Festival Inc.
- Lisa Baker, arts and culture manager at City of Playford
- Adrian Collette, CEO of Creative Australia

=== First Nations Arts ===
The First Nations Arts came into being in August 2024. It will be funded up to A$52 million from 2024 to 2025. Its function is "to support and promote Aboriginal and Torres Strait Islander arts practice, enhance sustainable career pathways for young First Nations people in the arts, and increase opportunities to grow First Nations audiences". It is overseen by the First Nations Board, with the first board commencing their term on 9 September. Each member serves a four-year term. The inaugural board consists of:

- Philip Watkins, Co-Chair
- Rachael Maza, Co-Chair
- Clint Bracknell
- Pauline Clague
- Jeanette James
- Deborah Mailman
- Daniel Riley (AD of Australian Dance Theatre)
- Rhoda Roberts
- Dennis Stokes
- Jared Thomas

=== Writing Australia ===
Writing Australia commenced operations on 1 July 2025. It will receive over A$26 million in funding over three years from 2025 to 2026 "to strengthen the Australian literature sector and develop further markets and audiences", at home and internationally. It will increase opportunities for writers and other creatives in literature, and establish a poet laureate for Australia.

The Writing Australia Council inaugural members are:

- Larissa Behrendt (Chair)
- Rachel Bin Salleh OAM
- Sarah Holland-Batt
- Sally Rippin
- Tim Jarvis
- Tommy Murphy
- Julie Pinkham
- Claire Pullen
- Christos Tsiolkas

== Programs and initiatives ==
=== ACCELERATE ===
ACCELERATE was a leadership program for Aboriginal and Torres Strait Islander people in the creative arts, run jointly by the British Council and Australia Council, in partnership with state arts agencies, between 2009 and 2016. During that time, 35 people participated in the program, with many alumni going on to excel in their fields.

=== Visual Art, Craft and Design Framework ===
The Visual Arts and Crafts Strategy (VACS), a partnership between the federal and all state and territory governments in Australia, was established in 2003, with the aim of "providing stability to Australia's visual arts and craft sector". VACS delivered funding across all jurisdictions, with half provided by the Commonwealth and half by the states and territories. Its policy framework ran from 2021 to 2024, continuing under the rebranded Creative Australia.

VACS was replaced by the Visual Art, Craft and Design Framework (VACDF) from 1 July 2025. Covering the years 2025-2028, VACDF was established at a meeting of all state and federal cultural ministers held on 9 June 2023. It is the sixth iteration of a national visual arts strategy.

=== Creative Futures Fund ===
The Creative Futures Fund, announced by Creative Australia on 10 July 2025, is an initiative of the Australian Government's cultural policy, (called "Revive: a place for every story, a story for every place"), issued in January 2023 and set to run for five years. (Note: The Creative Futures Fund is referenced in the cultural policy as "works of scale".) According to Creative Australia, "A key aim of the Fund is to leverage cross-sector partnerships to deliver ambitious works. The projects will intersect with fields from education, sport, science, agriculture, tourism and fashion through partnerships and collaborations". The fund is headed by Wendy Martin. In its first round of funding, 14 organisations received development investment, while six received delivery investment, in a total of A$7.8 million. Recipients of the funding include:

- Production of Suzie Miller's new play Strong Is the New Pretty, to be delivered by Brisbane Festival in partnership with Sydney Theatre Company and Trish Wadley Productions, directed by Lee Lewis
- An adaptation of Shaun Tan's Tales of the Inner City, to be presented across Perth's CBD by the Perth Festival
- Songs and Stories of Iutruwita/Tasmania, the first major musical work in the Tasmanian palawa language, featuring Dewayne Everettsmith; from the Tasmanian Symphony Orchestra
- Kumarangk, written by Wotjobaluk and Ngarrindjeri playwright and screenwriter Tracey Rigney and directed by Glenn Shea, a theatre work that tells the story of the women who led community resistance against the construction of the Hindmarsh Island Bridge, in Goolwa, South Australia from 1994 until 2001; produced by Country Arts SA
- Mama Does Derby, by Virginia Gay, produced by Adelaide-based children's theatre company Windmill Theatre Company

== Awards ==
=== Australia Council Awards ===
The Australia Council Awards were established in or before 1981, with the numbers of awards awarded each year growing over time. As of 2021 there were eight categories for achievement in various types of arts, called:

- Australia Council Don Banks Music Award
- Australia Council Lifetime Achievement in Literature
- Australia Council Award for Dance
- Australia Council Award for Visual Arts
- Australia Council Award for Emerging and Experimental Arts
- Australia Council Kirk Robson Award for Community Arts and Cultural Development
- Australia Council Ros Bower Award for Community Arts and Cultural Development
- Australia Council Award for Theatre

=== Fellowships ===
Australia Council Fellowships, worth A$80,000, "support creative activity and career development for mid-career and established artists". Past fellowship holders include: Hetti Perkins (2018), Lisa Maza (2017), Vicki Couzens (2016), Brenda L Croft (2015) and Reko Rennie (2015). They are awarded in the areas of Aboriginal and Torres Strait Islander arts; community arts and cultural development; dance; emerging and experimental arts; literature; music; theatre; and visual arts.

=== First Nations Arts and Culture Awards ===
The inaugural Red Ochre Award was established in 1993, when it was awarded to South Australian poet, actor, and playwright Eva Johnson. The annual National Indigenous Arts Awards (NIAA) were established by the Australia Council in 2007, and renamed to First Nations Arts Awards in 2020, and then to First Nations Arts and Culture Awards in 2025.

Former awards include:

- The First Nations Arts Fellowship, to support the creation of a major work; last awarded 2025
- The First Nations Emerging Career Development Award, which supports two artists or arts workers to pursue their professional development; last awarded 2024
- The Dreaming Award, established in 2012, "to support an inspirational young artist aged 18-26 years to create a major body of work through mentoring and partnerships", with Nakkiah Lui winning the inaugural award; last awarded 2024

From 2027 onwards they include four categories, all restricted to Australian First Nations artists:

- The Rhoda Roberts Trailblazer Award, established in October 2026 in honour of Rhoda Roberts, to be awarded in 2027; "celebrates individuals who have demonstrated visionary leadership and whose contribution has left a lasting impact and effected substantial change across the First Nations arts and cultural landscape, creating opportunities and possibilities (that didn't exist prior) for future generations"
- The Red Ochre Award, established in 1993, a lifetime award for outstanding lifetime achievement in the arts, is awarded annually to both a male and female recipient
- Established Artist of the Year Award (worth A$25,000), recognises achievement "in community arts and cultural development, dance, experimental arts, literature, multi-arts, music, theatre and/or visual arts with twenty or more years of continued artistic practice"
- Youth Award for Achievement in the Arts (worth A$25,000), recognises "an artist or arts worker in community arts and cultural development, dance, experimental arts, literature, multi-arts, music, theatre and/or visual arts between the age of 18 and 35"
- First Nations Arts and Culture Business Innovation Award (worth A$25,000), recognises innovation and excellence in entrepreneurship among Australian First Nations small to medium arts and culture businesses or community organisations (including Art Centres) nationwide

The awards ceremony is held event is held on 27 May each year, on the anniversary of the 1967 referendum. At the event, Indigenous Australians who have been awarded Fellowships (in 2018–2019, Vernon Ah Kee for visual art, and Ali Cobby Eckermann, for literature), and First Nations artists who received Australia Council Awards earlier in the year are also celebrated.

== Controversies ==
=== Casey Jenkins (2020) ===
In May 2020 the Australia Council awarded a A$25,000 grant to performance artist Casey Jenkins for a piece titled Immaculate, incorporating a live stream of Jenkins self-inseminating. Following adverse media coverage, the council suspended the funding hours before the first performance on 19 August, and formally rescinded the grant on 21 September 2020. The council stated that the withdrawal of the grant was not due to negative media coverage, but followed legal advice about the organisation's liabilities if pregnancy resulted. Jenkins said that the council had "grossly and insultingly mischaracterised my artwork". Writer and social commentator Ben Eltham wrote that the council's actions might have a chilling effect on performance art in Australia. After a lengthy Federal Court case, Creative Australia admitted fault, settling the case for a six-figure sum and a public apology and training.

=== Venice Biennale selection (2025) ===
In February 2025, a controversy occurred after Creative Australia first announced the selection of Khaled Sabsabi and curator Michael Dagostino to represent Australia at the Australia Pavilion at the 2026 Venice Biennale, then revoked the commission a week later, stating that it “believes a prolonged and divisive debate about the 2026 selection outcome poses an unacceptable risk to public support for Australia’s artistic community”. There were at least three resignations at Creative Australia in protest at the decision: visual arts department head Mikala Tai, program manager Tahmina Maskinyar, and artist Lindy Lee, who was a board member. Many others in the art world also protested via open letters or petitions, and a statement addressed to Creative Australia by Archie Moore and curator Ellie Buttrose, who presented their prizewinning kith and kin at the 2024 Venice Biennale, called for reinstatement of Sabsabi and Agostino, to no avail. Staff were told by chair Robert Morgan and CEO Adrian Collette on 20 February that the withdrawal decision would not be revised.

After an independent external review of the decision by Blackhall & Pearl, the pair were reinstated on 2 July 2025. The following day, acting chair of Creative Australia Wesley Enoch apologised for the "hurt and pain" caused by the rescindment.
