= Angelica Mesiti =

Australian artist (born 1976)

- Born: 1976; Sydney, Australia
- Known for: Video art
- Awards: Blake Prize, 2009

Angelica Mesiti (born 1976, Sydney) is an Australian multi-disciplinary artist of Italian descent, working in Paris and Sydney. She is best known for her combination of performances with video, sound and spatial installation that result in highly contemplative spaces. Her work is situated at the interstice of diasporic cultures, gestural communication and sensory togetherness.

Angelica Mesiti has completed a Bachelor of Fine Arts (Honours) and a Master of Fine Arts from the University of New South Wales in Sydney.

In 2009, Mesiti was the recipient of the 58th Blake Prize for her 10 minute video work called 'Rapture (silent anthem)', which depicts in slow motion joyful youths bathed in bright sunlight. Angelica Mesiti has been exhibiting her work since 2011 in venues including the Art Gallery of New South Wales, the 19th Biennale of Sydney, the Perth Institute of Contemporary Arts, Artspace Sydney, the National Gallery of Australia, the Museum of Contemporary Art of Montréal and the Palais de Tokyo in Paris, among others.

Mesiti has become best known for video works that use cinematic conventions and performance languages as a means of responding to personal histories and specific environments. The Calling 2013-2014 documents whistled languages in Turkey, Greece and the Canary Islands. Citizens Band (2012) constructs a virtual band with the performers in Paris, Sydney and Brisbane. It is an interesting commentary on the unravelling of the organic community.

Mesiti was a founding member of the Sydney-based artist-run initiative Imperial Slacks, where she curated the two-part video publication Serial 7's. She was a member of the all-female performance group The Kingpins.

Angelica Mesiti represented Australia at the 2019 Venice Biennale, with a three chanel work called ASSEMBLY filmed in the Senate chambers of Italy and Australia, and projected within an architectural amphitheatre. It was selected as a highlight of the Biennale by Artsy and Designboom. According to Associated Press, the work examines "ways citizens can assemble and communicate against the backdrop of fragile democracy." The artist suggests the work explores "the space where communication moves from verbal and written forms to non-verbal, gestural and musical forms."

She currently teaches at the Beaux-Arts de Paris school.

== Selected works ==
- The rain that fell in the faint light of the young Sun (2022)
- Future Perfect Continuous (2022)
- Over the Air and Underground (2020)
- A Hundred Years (2020)
- Assembly (2019)
- Relay League (2017)
- Mother Tongue (2017)
- Tossed by Waves (2017)
- The Colour of Saying (2015)
- Nakh Removed (2015)
- In the Ear of the Tyrant (2014)
- The Calling (2013–14)
- Citizens Band (2012)
- Prepared Piano for Movers (Haussmann) (2012)
- Rapture (Silent Anthem) (2009)

== Selected publications ==
- A Communication of Stranger Gestures Angelica Mesiti, Art Space, 2017.
- Angelica Mesiti «Quand faire c’est dire» Palais de Tokyo 20.02 - 12.05, 2019.
- Angelica Mesiti Assembly, Australia Council for the Arts, Pavilion of Australia at the 58th International Art Exhibition of La Biennale di Venezia, 2019.
- In the Round Angelica Mesiti, Talbot Rice Gallery, 2022.
