= National Association for the Visual Arts =

The National Association for the Visual Arts (NAVA) is the national peak body for the visual arts, craft and design in Australia. It advocates for the sector as well as undertaking research and policy development and providing direct services to its members. It publishes its research.

It was founded in 1983. Since then, it has brought about policy and legislative change to encourage the growth and development of the sector, re-established the Artists' Benevolent Fund, lobbied for the sector during the COVID-19 pandemic in Australia, written submissions to government and inquiries, and much more.

In March 2018 it undertook a gender equity campaign, and in August of that year organised a two-day event called "Future/Forward", aimed at getting input on its code of practice, and discuss ways and means of supporting artists, their rights, and their incomes.

In 2017-2020 the executive director of NAVA was Esther Anatolitis. As of 2021 Penelope Benton holds the position.

It published a quarterly journal, NAVA Quarterly, between 2004 and 2013. One of its publications is a guide to awards, prizes and professional development opportunities for artists. Since 2017 NAVA produces a series of podcasts.
