= List of national pavilions at the 60th Venice Biennale =

Nations participating in the 2024 art exhibition

The 60th Venice Biennale is an international contemporary art exhibition to be held from April through November 2024. The Venice Biennale takes place every two years in Venice, Italy, and participating nations select artists to show at their pavilions, hosted in the Venice Giardini, Arsenale, and palazzos throughout the city.

== National pavilions ==
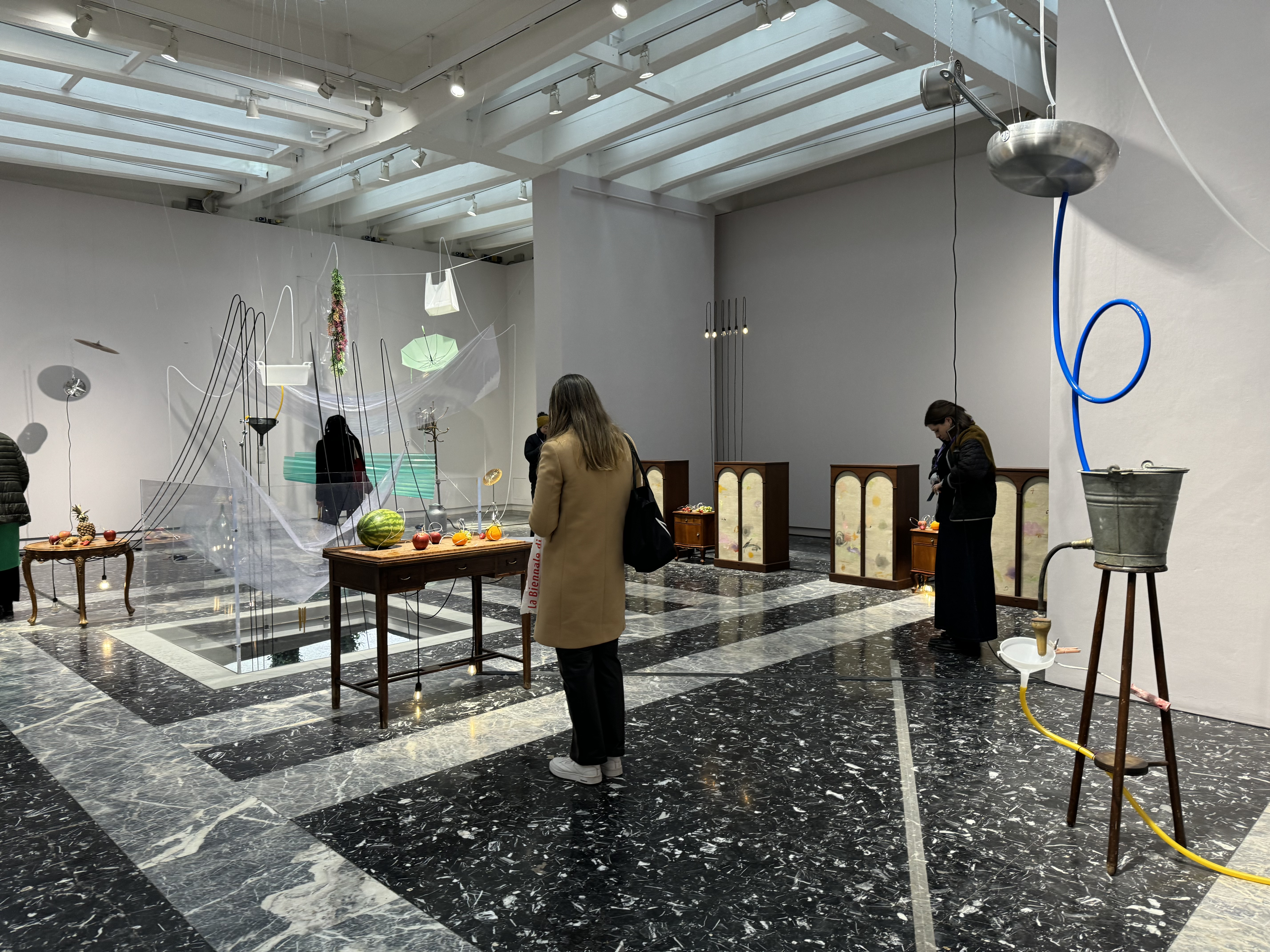
Interior of the Japanese Pavilion at the 2024 Venice Biennale.

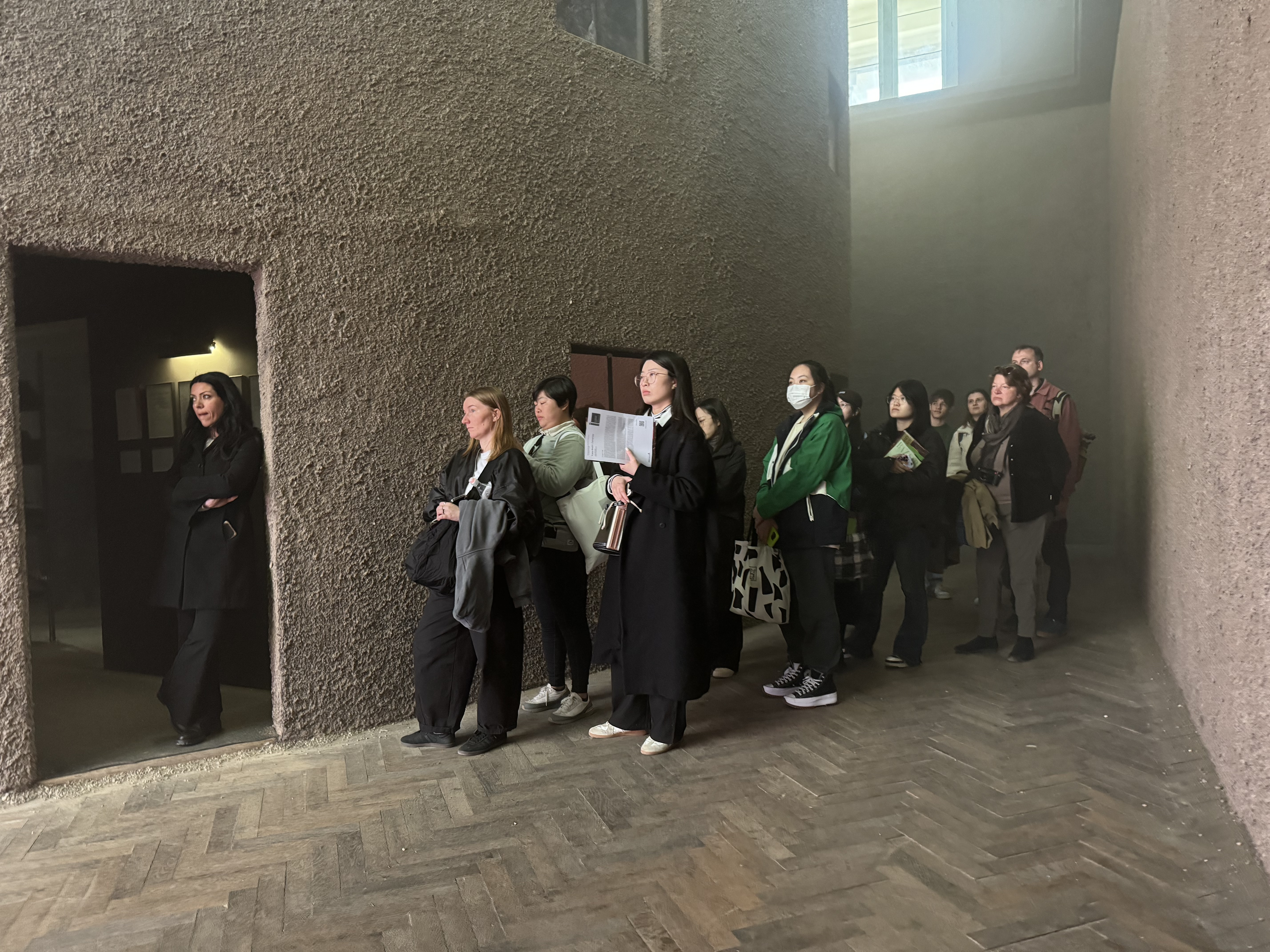
Long lines at the German Pavilion at the 2024 Venice Biennale.

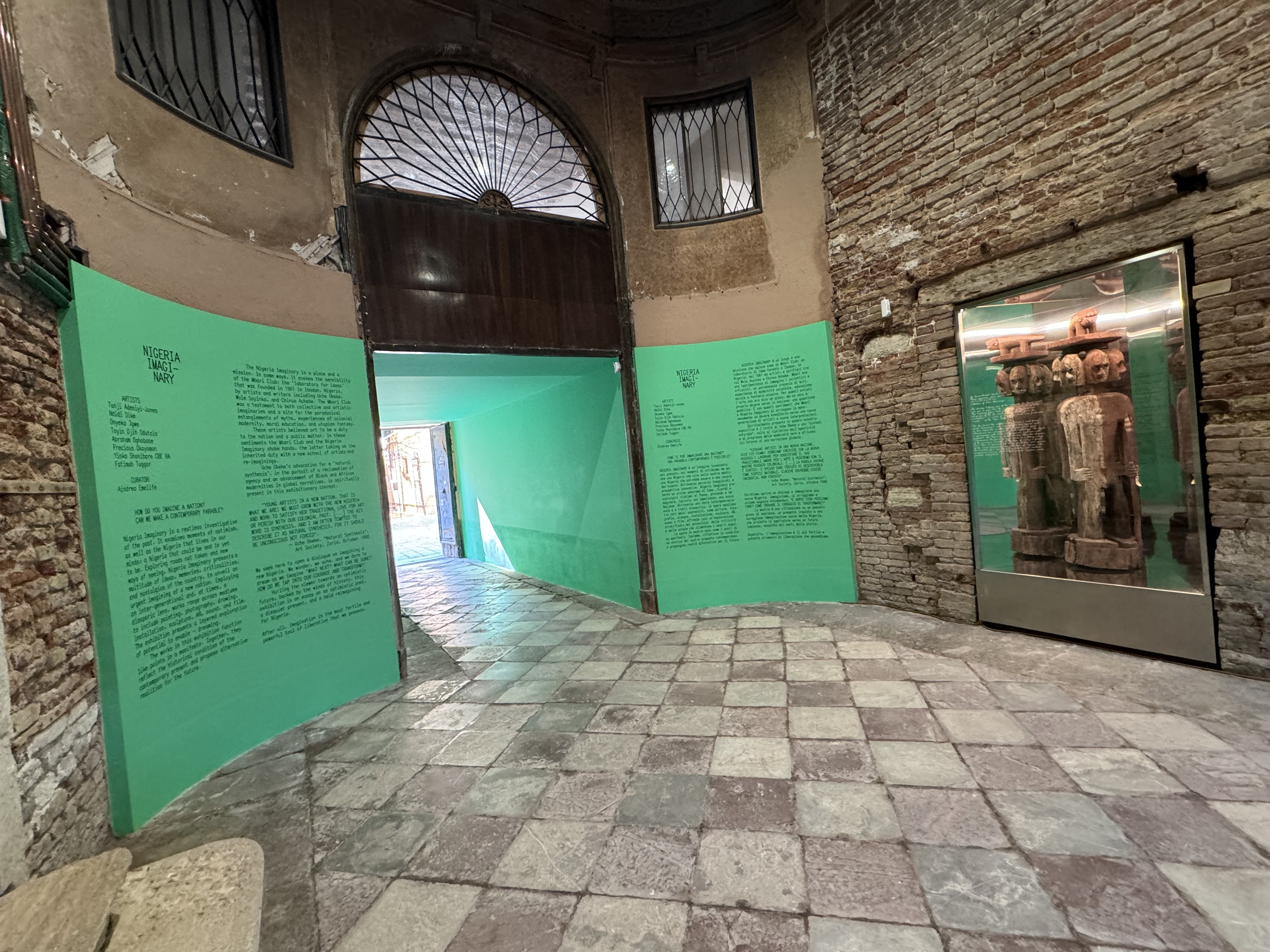
Interior of the Nigerian Pavilion at the 2024 Venice Biennale.

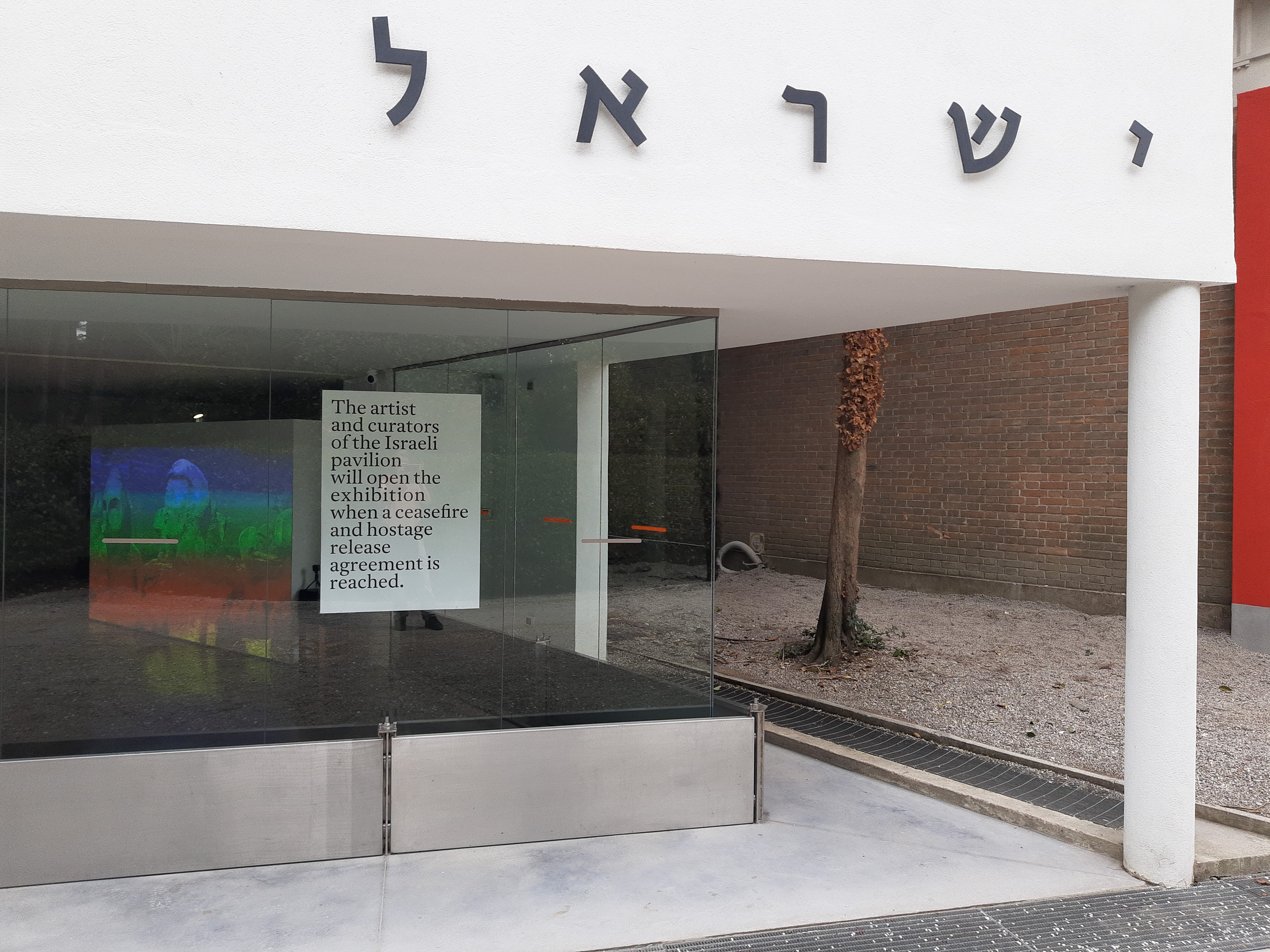
The Israeli Pavilion was closed during the 2024 Venice Biennale as a result of the Gaza conflict.

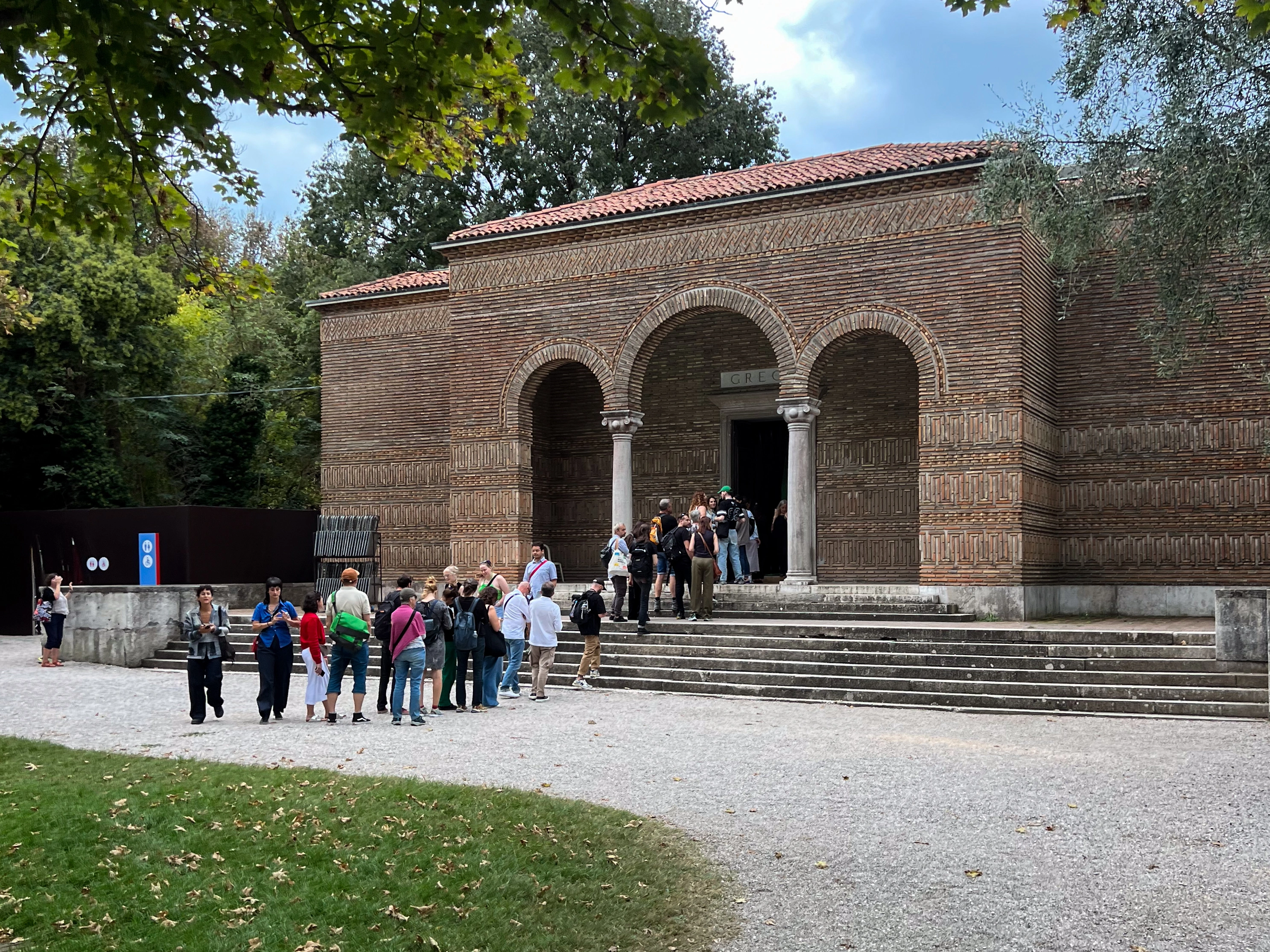
Visitors queue for the Greek Pavilion at the 2024 Venice Biennale.

Nation	Location	Artist(s)	Curator(s)	Ref
Albania	Arsenale	Iva Lulashi	Antonio Grulli	
Argentina	Arsenale	Luciana Lamothe	Sofia Dourron	
Armenia	Around Venice	Nina Khemchyan	Armen Yesayants	
Australia	Giardini	Archie Moore	Ellie Buttrose	
Austria	Giardini	Anna Jermolaewa	Gabriele Spindler	
Azerbaijan	Around Venice	Vusala Agharaziyeva, Rashad Alakbarov, and Irina Eldarova	Luca Beatrice and Amina Melikova	
Bangladesh	Around Venice	Abdur Rab, Mini Karim, Shahjahan Ahmed Bikash, Shahid Kabir, Claudia De Leonardis, Anna Carla De Leonardis, Roberto Saglietto, Nataliia Revoniuk, Patrizia Casagranda, DoJoong Jo, Jiyoon Oh, Franco Marrocco, Marco Nereo Rotelli, and Mirko Demattè	Viviana Vannucci	
Belgium	Giardini	Denicolai & Provoost, Antoinette Jattiot, Nord, and Spec uloos	N/A	
Benin	Around Venice	Chloé Quenum, Moufouli Bello, Ishola Akpo, and Romuald Hazoumè	Azu Nwagbogu	
Bolivia	Giardini	Elvira Espejo Ayca, Oswaldo “Achu” De, León Kantule, Yanaki Herrera, Duhigó, Zahy Tentehar, Lorgio Vaca, Maria Alexandra Bravo Cladera, Rolando Vargas Ramos, Edwin Alejo, Cristina Quispe Huanca, Martina Mamani Robles, Prima Flores Torrez, Laura Tola Ventura, María Eugenia Cruz Sanchez, Faustina Flores Ferreyra, Pamela Onostre Reynolds, Guillermina Cueva Sita, Magdalena Cuasace, Claudia Opimi Vaca, Olga Rivero Díaz, Reina Morales Davalos, Silvia Montaño Ito, Ignacia Chuviru Surubi, Ronald Morán, and Humberto Velez	Ministry of Culture of the Plurinational State of Bolivia	
Bosnia-Herzegovina	Around Venice	Stjepan Skoko	Marin Ivanović	
Brazil	Giardini	Glicéria Tupinambá with Comunità Tupinambá della Serra do Padeiro, Olivença a Bahia, Olinda Tupinambá, and Ziel Karapotó	Arissana Pataxó, Denilson Baniwa, and Gustavo Caboco Wapichana	
Bulgaria	Around Venice	Krasimira Butseva, Julian Chehirian, and Lilia Topouzova	Vasil Vladimirov	
Cameroon	Around Venice	Jean Michel Dissake, Hako Hankson, Kendji & Ollo Arts, Patrick-Joël Tatcheda Yonkeu, Guy Wouete, Angelo Accardi, Julia Bornefeld, Cesare Catania, Adélaïde Laurent-Bellue, Franco Mazzucchelli, Rex and Edna Volcan, Giorgio Tentolini, and Liu Youju	Paul Emmanuel Loga Mahop and Sandro Orlandi Stagl	
Canada	Giardini	Kapwani Kiwanga	Gaëtane Verna	
Chile	Around Venice	Valeria Montti Colque	Andrea Pacheco González	
China	Arsenale	Che Jianquan, Jiao Xingtao, Shi Hui, Qiu Zhenzhong, Wang Shaoqiang, Wang Zhenghong, Zhu Jinshi, and The project team of “A Comprehensive Collection of Ancient Chinese Paintings”	Wang Xiaosong, Jiang Jun	
Democratic Republic of the Congo	Around Venice	Aimé Mpane, Eddy Ekete, Steve Bandoma, Jean Katambayi Mukendi, Kongo Astronauts, Cedrick Sungo, and Eddy Kamuanga	Gabriele Giuseppe Salmi	
Croatia	Around Venice	Vlatka Horvat	Antonia Majača	
Cuba	Around Venice	Wilfredo Prieto García	Nelson Ramirez de Arellano	
Cyprus	Around Venice	Forever Informed: Lower Levant Company (Peter Eramian, Emiddio Vasquez), Endrosia (Andreas Andronikou, Marina Ashioti, Niki Charalambous, Doris Mari Demetriadou, Irini Khenkin, Rafailia Tsiridou, Alexandros Xenophontos), and Haig Aivazian	N/A	
Czech Republic	Giardini	Eva Koťátková in collaboration with Himali Singh Soin, David Tappeser, Gesturing Towards Decolonial Futures, and a group of children and elders	Hana Janečková	
Denmark	Giardini	Inuuteq Storch	Louise Wolthers	
Egypt	Giardini	Wael Shawky	N/A	
Estonia	Around Venice	Edith Karlson	TBD	
Ethiopia	Around Venice	Tesfaye Urgessa	Lemn Sissay OBE FRSL	
Finland	Giardini	Pia Lindman, Vidha Saumya and Jenni-Juulia Wallinheimo-Heimonen	Yvonne Billimore and Jussi Koitela	
France	Giardini	Julien Creuzet	Céline Kopp and Cindy Sissokho	
Georgia	Around Venice	Nikoloz Koplatadze, Grigol Nodia, Juliette George, Rodrigue de Ferluc, Iliazd, Max Ernst, and Ernst Wilhelm Tempel	Julia Marchand and David Koroshinadze	
Germany	Giardini	Yael Bartana, Ersan Mondtag, Michael Akstaller, Nicole L'Huillier, Robert Lippok, and Jan St. Werner	Çağla Ilk	
Great Britain	Giardini	John Akomfrah	Tarini Malik	
Greece	Giardini	Thanasis Deligiannis, Yannis Michalopoulos, Elia Kalogianni, Yorgos Kyvernitis, Kostas Chaikalis and Fotis Sagonas	Panos Giannikopoulos	
Grenada	Around Venice	Frederika Adam, BREAKFAST, Jason deCaires Taylor, Antonello Diodato Guardigli (ADGART), Alma Fakhre, Suelin Low Chew Tung, Gabriele Maquignaz, Lorenzo Marini, Benaiah Matheson, The Perceptive Group, and Nello Petrucci	Daniele Radini Tedeschi	
Holy See	Around Venice	Maurizio Cattelan, Bintou Dembélé, Simone Fattal, Claire Fontaine, Sonia Gomes, Corita Kent, Marco Perego & Zoe Saldana, and Claire Tabouret	Chiara Paris and Bruno Racine	
Hungary	Giardini	Márton Nemes	Róna Kopeczky	
Iceland	Arsenale	Hildigunnur Birgisdóttir	Dan Byers	
Iran	Around Venice	Abdolhamid Ghadirian, Gholamali Taheri, Kazem Chalipa, Morteza Asadi, and Mostafa Goudarzi	Amir Abdolhoseini and Shoaib Hosseini Moghaddam	
Ireland	Arsenale	Eimear Walshe	Sara Greavu with Project Arts Centre	
Israel	Giardini	Ruth Patir	Mira Lapidot and Tamar Margalit	
Italy	Arsenale	Massimo Bartolini	Luca Cerizza	
Ivory Coast	Around Venice	Jems Koko Bi, François Xavier Gbré, Sadikou Oukpedjo, Franck Abd-Bakar Fanny and Marie Claire Messouma Manlanbien	Simon Njami	
Japan	Giardini	Yuko Mohri	Sook-Kyung Lee	
Kazakhstan	Around Venice	Lena Pozdnyakova, Eldar Tagi, Kamil Mulashev, Saken Narynov, Yerbolat Tolepbay, Sergey Maslov, and Anvar Musrepov	Danagul Tolepbay and Anvar Musrepov	
Korea	Giardini	Koo Jeong A	Jacob Fabricius and Lee Seol-hui	
Kosovo	Around Venice	Doruntina Kastrati	Erëmirë Krasniqi	
Latvia	Arsenale	Amanda Ziemele	Adam Budak	
Lebanon	Arsenale	Mounira Al Solh	Nada Ghandour	
Lithuania	Around Venice	Pakui Hardware	Valentinas Klimašauskas and João Laia	
Luxembourg	Arsenale	Andrea Mancini & Every Island (Alessandro Cugola, Martina Genovesi, Caterina Malavolti, Juliane Seehawer)	Joel Valabrega	
Malta	Arsenale	Matthew Attard	Elyse Tonna and Sara Dolfi Agostini	
Mexico	Arsenale	Erick Meyenberg	Tania Ragasol	
Mongolia	Around Venice	Ochirbold Ayurzana	Oyuntuya Oyunjargal	
Montenegro	Around Venice	Darja Bajagić	Ana Simona Zelenović	
The Netherlands	Giardini	Congolese Plantation Workers Art League and Renzo Martens	Hicham Khalidi	
Nigeria	Around Venice	Tunji Adeniyi-Jones, Ndidi Dike, Onyeka Igwe, Toyin Ojih Odutola, Abraham Oghobase, Precious Okoyomon, Yinka Shonibare CBE RA, and Fatimah Tuggar	Aindrea Emelife	
Nordic pavilion	Giardini	Lap-See Lam with Kholod Hawash and Tze Yeung Ho	Asrin Haidari	
North Macedonia	Around Venice	Slavica Janešlieva	Ana Frangovska	
Oman	Around Venice	Alia al Farsi, Ali al Jabri, Essa al Mufarji, Adham al Farsi, and Sarah al Olaqi	Alia Al Farsi	
Panama	Around Venice	Brooke Alfaro, Isabel De Obaldía, Cisco Merel, and Giana De Dier	Ana Elizabeth Gonzalez and Monica Kupfer	
Peru	Arsenale	Roberto Huarcaya	Alejandro León Cannock	
The Philippines	Around Venice	Mark Salvatus	Carlos Quijon, Jr.	
Poland	Giardini	Open Group (Yuriy Biley, Pavlo Kovach, and Anton Varga)	Marta Czyż	
Portugal	Around Venice	Mónica de Miranda, Sónia Vaz Borges, and Vânia Gala	N/A	
Romania	Giardini	Șerban Savu and Atelier Brenda (Nana Esi and Sophie Keij)	Ciprian Mureșan	
San Marino	Around Venice	Eddie Martinez	Alison M. Gingeras	
Saudi Arabia	Arsenale	Manal AlDowayan	Jessica Cerasi and Maya El Khalil	
Senegal	Arsenale	Alioune Diagne	Massamba Mbaye	
Serbia	Giardini	Aleksandar Denić	Ksenija Samadržija	
Seychelles	Arsenale	Jude Ally, Ryan Chetty, Danielle Freakley, and Juliette Zelime (aka Jadez)	Martin Kennedy	
Singapore	Arsenale	Robert Zhao Renhui	Haeju Kim	
Slovakia	Giardini	Oto Hudec	Lýdia Pribišová	
Slovenia	Around Venice	Nika Špan	Vladimir Vidmar	
South Africa	Arsenale	MADEYOULOOK (Molemo Moiloa & Nare Mokgotho)	Portia Malatjie	
Spain	Giardini	Sandra Gamarra	Agustín Pérez Rubio	
Switzerland	Giardini	Guerreiro do Divino Amor	Andrea Bellini	
Tanzania	Around Venice	Haji Chilonga, Naby, Happy Robert, and Lutengano Mwakisopile (Lute)	Enrico Bittoto	
Timor Leste	Around Venice	Maria Madeira	Natalie King	
Turkey	Arsenale	Gülsün Karamustafa	Esra Sarıgedik Öktem	
Uganda	Around Venice	Artisan Weavers’ Collective, Sana Gateja, Taga Nuwagaba, Xenson Ssenkaba, Jose Hendo, and Odur Ronald	Elizabeth Acaye Kerunen	
Ukraine	Arsenale	Katya Buchatska, Andrii Dostliev, Lia Dostlieva, Daniil Revkovskyi, Andrii Rachynskyi, and Oleksandr Burlaka	Viktoria Bavykina and Max Gorbatskyi	
United Arab Emirates	Arsenale	Abdullah Al Saadi	Tarek Abou El Fetouh	
United States	Giardini	Jeffrey Gibson	Abigail Winograd and Kathleen Ash-Milby	
Uruguay	Giardini	Eduardo Cardozo	Elisa Valerio	
Uzbekistan	Arsenale	Aziza Kadyri	Center for Contemporary Art Tashkent	
Venezuela	Giardini	Juvenal Ravelo	Edgar Ernesto Gonzalez	
Zimbabwe	Around Venice	Gillian Rosselli, Kombo Chapfika, Moffat Takadiwa, Sekai Machache, Troy Makaza, and Victor Nyakauru	Fadzai Veronica Muchemwa	
