= Greek pavilion =

Venice Biennale national pavilion

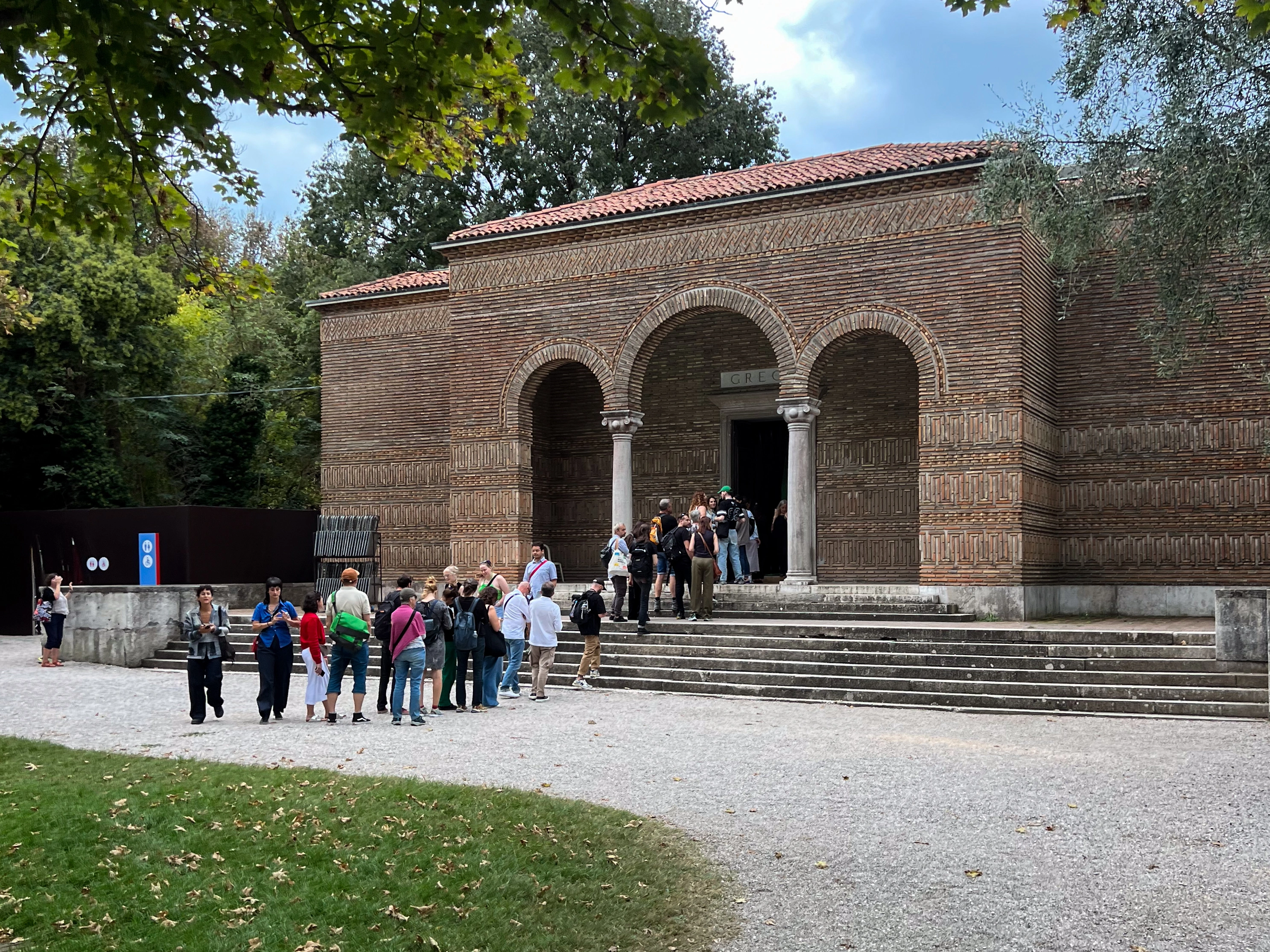
The Greek pavilion during the 2024 Venice Biennale

The Greek pavilion houses Greece's national representation during the Venice Biennale arts festivals.

== Background ==
The Venice Biennale is an international art biennial exhibition held in Venice, Italy. Often described as "the Olympics of the art world", participation in the Biennale is a prestigious event for contemporary artists. The festival has become a constellation of shows: a central exhibition curated by that year's artistic director, national pavilions hosted by individual nations, and independent exhibitions held throughout Venice. The Biennale's parent organisation also runs regular festivals in other arts: architecture, dance, film, music and theatre.

Outside the central international exhibition, individual nations produce their own shows, known as pavilions, as their national representation. Nations that own their pavilion buildings – such as the 30 housed in the Giardini – are responsible for their own upkeep and construction costs as well. Nations without dedicated buildings create pavilions in venues throughout the city.

== Organisation and building ==
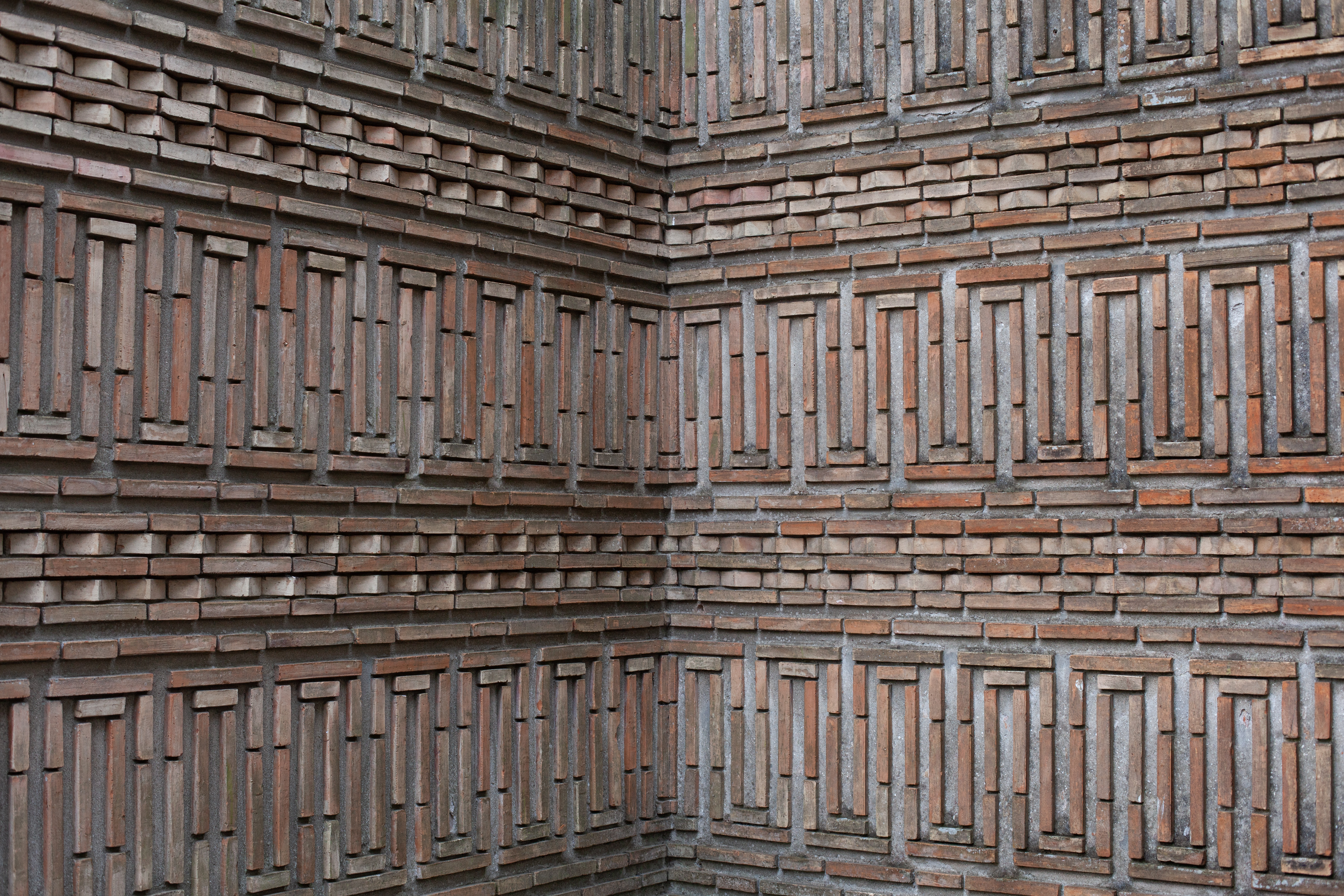
Detail of the Greek pavilion's architectural style

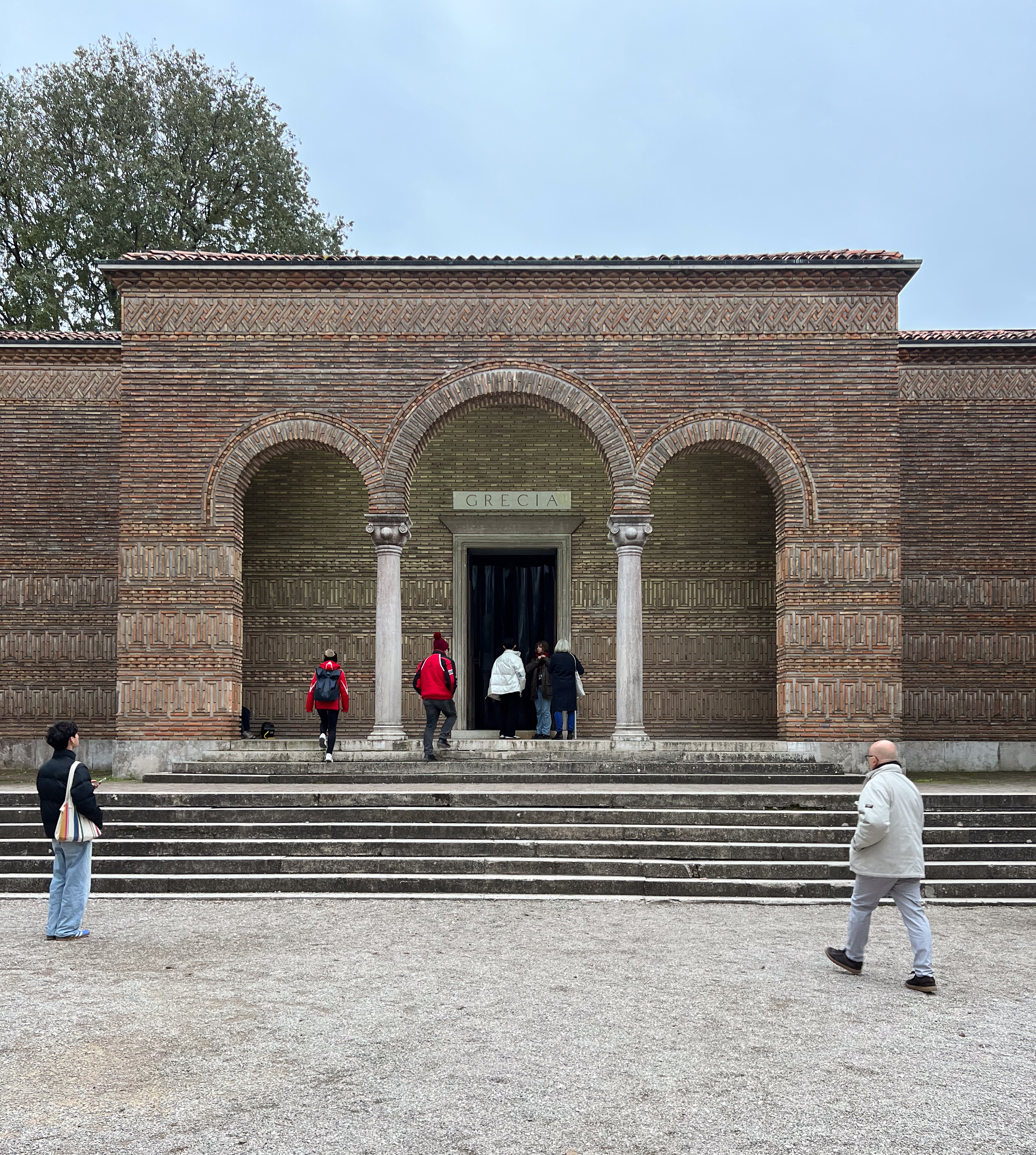
The main entrance of the Greek pavilion

The architect Y. Papandréou designed the pavilion, which was built between 1933 and 1934. Brenno Del Giudice, who led the Biennale's Sant'Elena expansion, also collaborated on the project. The pavilion was built in a Neo‑Byzantine style, emphasising the Byzantine dimension of Hellenism – a highly engaging issue in Greece at the time. The building's simple layout includes a T‑shaped hall. Greek and diamond patterns adorn the brickwork, and Greco‑Byzantine round arches line the portico. The word 'GRECIA' is written in marble above the entrance.

The Greek pavilion is administered by the Greek Ministry of Culture, which is also responsible for organising Greece's participation in the Venice Biennale International Art Exhibition.

== Pavilion location and accessibility ==
The Greek pavilion is located in the Giardini of the Venice Biennale. Visitors can reach the Greek pavilion either through the main entrance, making it one of the last pavilions on their walking route, or through the back entrance of the Giardini, where the Greek pavilion is the first in sight. The building is accessible either via its frontal main entrance using the stairs, or via a ramp on the right side of the building that leads to the back entrance of the pavilion.

== Representation by year ==
=== Art ===
- 1934 — Maria Anagnostopoulou–Vranica, Panos Aravantinos, Umberto Argyros, Constantinos Artemis, Nicolas Asprogerakas, Aginor Asteriadis, Michael Axelos, Koula Bekiari, Dimetrios Braessas, Periklis Byzantios, Pavlos Calligas, Alexandros Christofis, Dimitrios Cocotsis, Photis Kontoglou, George Cosmadopoulos (Cosmo), Dimitrios Davis, George Demetriadis, Dimitrios Dimas, Joséphine Dimas, Ector Ducas, Penelope Economidi, Thalia Flora–Karavia, Nicos Georgandis, Andreas Georgiadis, Vassilis Germenis, Dimitris Gheraniotis, Apostolos Gheralis, Lucas Gheralis, Dimitrios Ghianoukakis, Nikos Hadjikyriakos-Ghikas, George Gounaropoulos (Gounaro), Costas Heliades, Evanghelos Joannidis, Maria Kalari, Orestis Kanellis, Tryphon Kazakos, Nelly Kyriakou–Calliga, Sofia Lascaridi, Theodoros Lazaris, Periklis Lytras, Micky Matsakis, Yannis Mitarakis, Stelios Miliadis, Christophoros Natsios, Nicholaos Othoneos, Maria Zarpa–Panoutsou, Costas Pangalos, Aglae Papa, Efthimios Papadimitriou, Konstantinos Parthenis, Dimitrios Pelekassis, Odysseas Phocas, George Procopiou, Bella Raftopoulou, Pavlos Rodokanakis, George Sinnefas, Antonios Sochos, Cesare Sofianopulo, Anghelos Spahi, Anghelos Theodoropoulos, Dante Thomopoulos, Epaminondas Thomopoulos, Thomas Thomopoulos, Michalis Tombros, Maria Tsangri Bavavia, Spyros Vassiliou, Spyros Vikatos, Dimitris Vitsoris, Grigorios Zevgolis (Commissioner: Typaldo Forestis)
- 1936 — Konstantinos Maleas, Nikolaos Lytras, C. Stefanopoulo Alessandridi, Umberto Argyros, Aglae Papa, Epaminondas Thomopoulos, Maria Tsangri Bavavia, Vrasidas Tsouclos, Cesare Sofianopulo, Spyros Vikatos, Emmanuel Zairis, Achilleas Varvaressos, Pavlos Calligas, Dimitrios Cocotsis, George Cosmadopoulos (Cosmo), Kostas Dimitriadis, Lycourgos Kogevinas, Eleni Kolokotroni Mania, Nicolas Leprince, Pavlos Mathiopoulos, Yannis Mitarakis, Nicos Nicolaou, Nicholaos Othoneos, Doris Papageorgiou, Nicolaos Perantinos, Kostas Plakotaris, Pavlos Rodokanakis, Marcos Zavitsianos (Commissioner: Typaldo Forestis)
- 1938 — Constantin Parthenis, Michalis Tombros, Angelos Theodoropoulos (Commissioners: Antonios Benakis, Typaldo Forestis)
- 1940 — Aginor Asteriadis, Yannis Mitarakis, Pavlos Rodokanakis, Dimitris Vitsoris, Bella Raftopoulou, Costis Papachristopoulos, George Zongolopoulos, Dimitrios Ghianoukakis, Alexandros Korogiannakis, Efthimios Papadimitriou (Commissioners: Antonios Benakis, Typaldo Forestis)
- 1950 — Thanassis Apartis, George Bousianis, Andreas Georgiadis, Nikos Hadjikyriakos-Ghikas, Cesare Sofianopulo, (Alevizos) Tassos, Emmanuel Zairis (Commissioner: Gerasmo Messinis)
- 1976 — Michael Michaeledes, Aglaia Liberaki (Commissioner: Sotiris Messinis)
- 1978 — Yannis Pappas (Commissioner: Sotiris Messinis)
- 1980 — Pavlos (Dionysopoulos) (Commissioners: Sotiris Messinis, Emmanuel Mavrommatis)
- 1982 — Diamantis Diamantopoulos, Costas Coulentianos (Commissioner: Sotiris Messinis)
- 1984 — Christos Caras, George Georgiadis (Commissioner: Sotiris Messinis)
- 1986 — Costas Tsoclis (Commissioners: Nelli Missirli, Sotiris Messinis)
- 1988 — Vlassis Caniaris, Nikos Kessanlis (Commissioner: Emmanuel Mavrommatis)
- 1990 — Georges Lappas, Yannis Bouteas (Commissioner: Manos Stefanidis)
- 1993 — George Zongolopoulos (Commissioner: Efi Andreadi)
- 1995 — Takis (Commissioner: Maria Marangou)
- 1997 — Dimitris Alithinos, Stephen Antonakos, Thanasis Totsikas, Alexandros Psychoulis (Commissioner: Efi Strousa)
- 1999 — Costas Varotsos, Danae Stratou, Evanthia Tsantila (Commissioner: Anna Kafetsi)
- 2001 — Nikos Navridis, Ilias Papailiakis, Ersi Chatziargyrou (Commissioner: Lina Tsikouta)
- 2003 — Athanasia Kyriakakos, Dimitris Rotsios (Commissioner: Marina Fokidis)
- 2005 — George Hadjimichalis (Commissioner: Katerina Koskina)
- 2007 — Nikos Alexiou (Commissioner: Yorgos Tzirtzilakis)
- 2009 — Lucas Samaras (Curator: Matthew Higgs)
- 2011 — Diohandi (Curator: Maria Marangou)
- 2013 — Stefanos Tsivopoulos (Curator: Syrago Tsiara)
- 2015 — Maria Papadimitriou (Curator: Gabi Scardi)
- 2017 — George Drivas (Curator: Orestis Andreadakis)
- 2019 — Panos Charalambous, Eva Stefani, Zafos Xagoraris (Curator: Katerina Tselou)
- 2022 — Loukia Alavanou (Curator: Heinz Peter Schwerfel)
- 2024 — Conceived by Thanasis Deligiannis and Yannis Michalopoulos, created along with Elia Kalogianni, Yorgos Kyvernitis, Kostas Chaikalis, Fotis Sagonas (Curator: Panos Giannikopoulos)
- 2026 — Andreas Angelidakis (Curator: George Bekirakis)

=== Architecture ===
- 1991 — S. and D. Antonakakis, N. Valsamaki, A. Tompazi, Dimitris Pikionis (Commissioner: Keti Mikou-Karachaliou, Deputy Commissioners: Takis Koumpis, Agni Pikioni)
- 1996 — Kyriakos Krokos (Commissioner: Andreas Giakoumakatos)
- 2000 — "The City: Less aesthetic, more ethical" (Commissioner: Ilias Zeggelis)
- 2002 — "Athens 2002: Absolute Realism" (Commissioners: Takis Koumpis, Thanasis Moutsopoulos, Richard Scoffier)
- 2004 — "Examples" (Commissioners: Aristides Antonas, Hariklia Hari, Filippos Oreopoulos, Zafos Xagoraris)
- 2006 — "Aegean: a scattered city" (Commissioners: Katerina Kotzia, Ilias Konstantopoulos, Lois Papadopoulos, Korina Filoxenidou)
- 2008 — "Athens by Sound" (Commissioners: Anastasia Karandinou, Christina Achtipi, Stelios Giamarelos)
- 2010 — "The Ark. Old Seeds for New Cultures" (Commissioners: Zisis Kitionis, Foebe GIannisi)
- 2012 — "Made in Athens" (Commissioners: Panos Dragonas, Anna Skiada)
- 2014 — "Tourism Landscapes: Remaking Greece" (Commissioner: Yannis Aesopos)
- 2018 — "The School of Athens" Curators: Christina Argyros, Ryan Neiheiser
- 2021 — "Boulevard de la Société des Nations - The Well-Known Aristotle Axis in Thessaloniki" Nikos Kalogirou, Maria Dousi, Dimitris Thomopoulos, Dimitris Kontaxakis, Sofoklis Kotsopoulos, Themistoklis Hatzigiannopoulos (Commissioner: Efthimios Mpakogiannakis)
- 2023 — "Bodies of Water" Curators: Costis Paniyiris and Andreas Nikolovgenis (Commissioner: Efthimios Bakoyannis, General Secretary of Spatial Planning and Urban Environment)

== Bibliography ==
- Russeth, Andrew (April 17, 2019). "The Venice Biennale: Everything You Could Ever Want to Know". ARTnews.
- Volpi, Cristiana (2013). "Greece". In Re Rebaudengo, Adele (ed.). Pavilions and Garden of Venice Biennale. Rome: Contrasto. p. 181. ISBN 978-88-6965-440-4.
