= Nello Petrucci =

Italian street artist and movie director

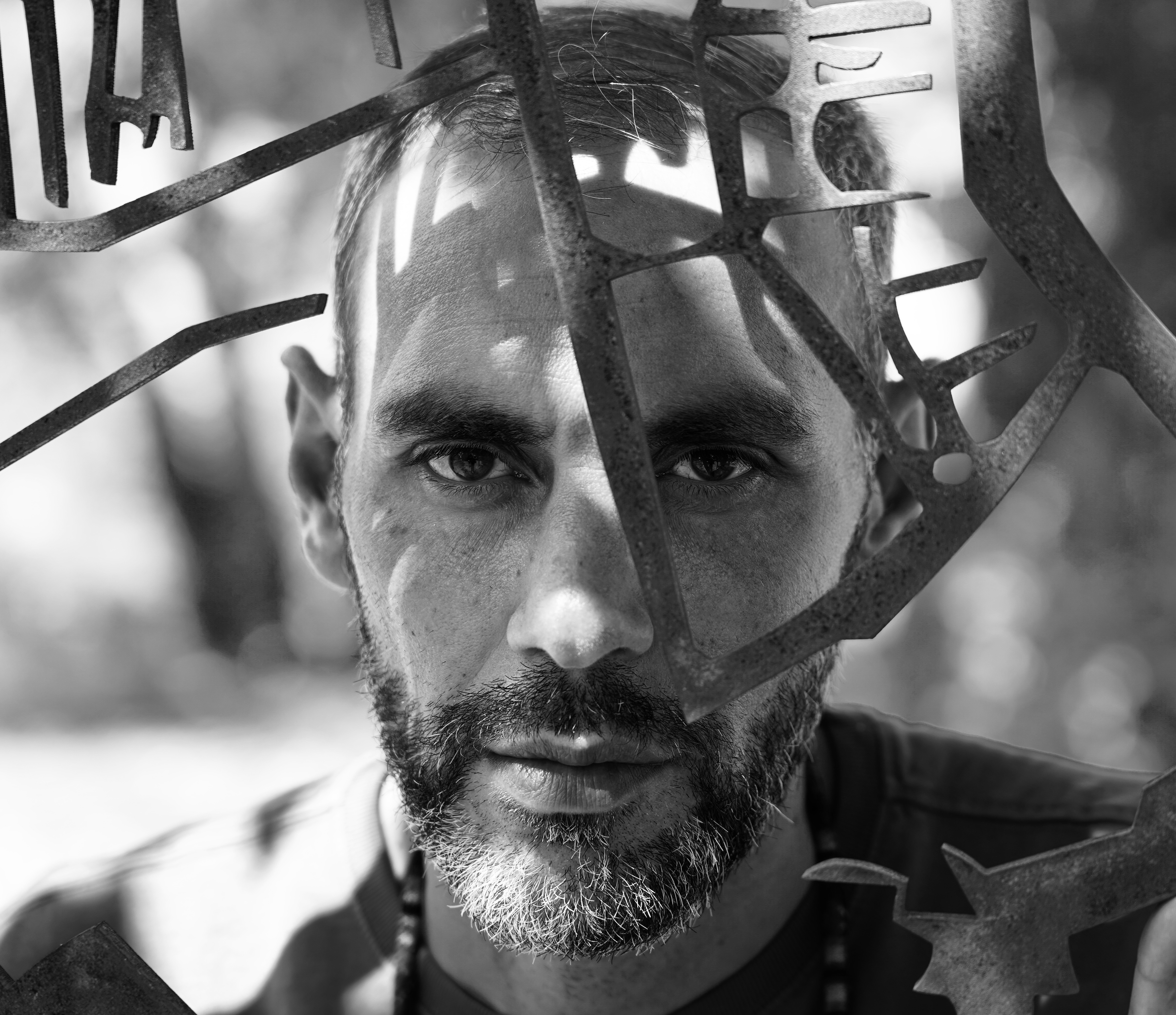
Nello Petrucci in Venice 2021

Aniello Petrucci, known professionally as Nello Petrucci (born 26 January 1981) is an Italian artist and film director. He specializes in painting, street art, and sculpture, and works in both collage and halftone. Petrucci lives and works in Pompei and New York City.

== Biography ==
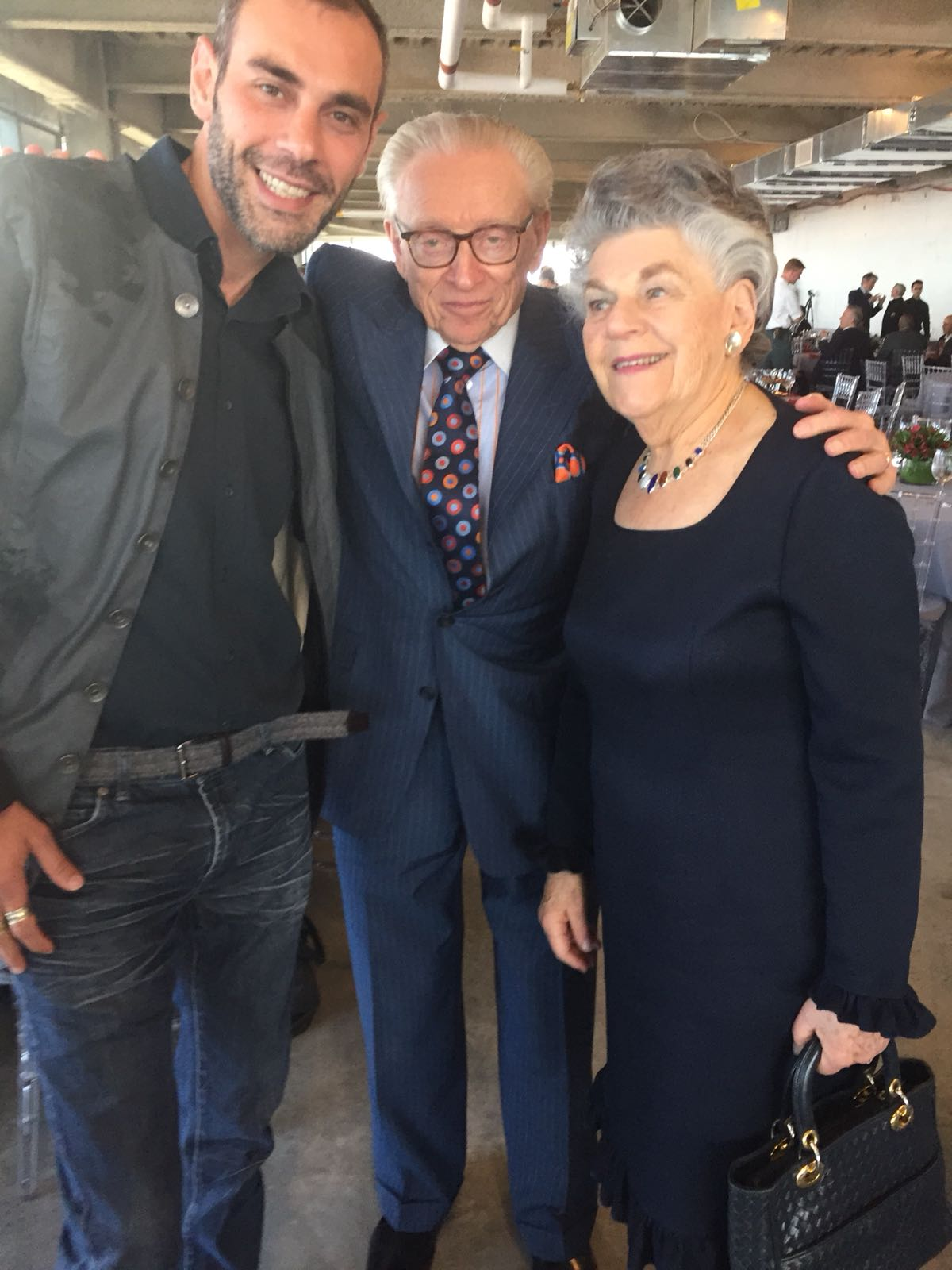
Nello Petrucci with Larry and Klara Silverstein, in 2018

Petrucci was born on January 26, 1981, in Castellammare di Stabia, a comune within the Naples metropolitan area. In the early 2000s, he studied cinema in Rome. He attained a degree in scenography from the Academy of Fine Arts in Naples in 2010.

== Career ==
Petrucci often includes social and environmental issues in his works. An example of this is his installation Plastic River, which depicts a whale made of recycled plastic. Plastic River was exhibited in Pompei in 2019 to highlight the environmental impacts of excessive plastic use. In 2019, Petrucci also participated in the third rendition of Subscatti "Il Golfo di Plastica", an exhibition highlighting the impact of ocean plastic pollution. His contribution was exhibited at the Archaeological Museum of Herculaneum.

Petrucci is the artistic director of the Pompei Street Festival and Stabiae Street, inviting about 40 international street artists to Pompei, including C215, M-City, Francisco Bosoletti, Ledania, Gianpiero, Mr.Kas, Maxi Bagnasco and others.

=== Collections and sculptures ===
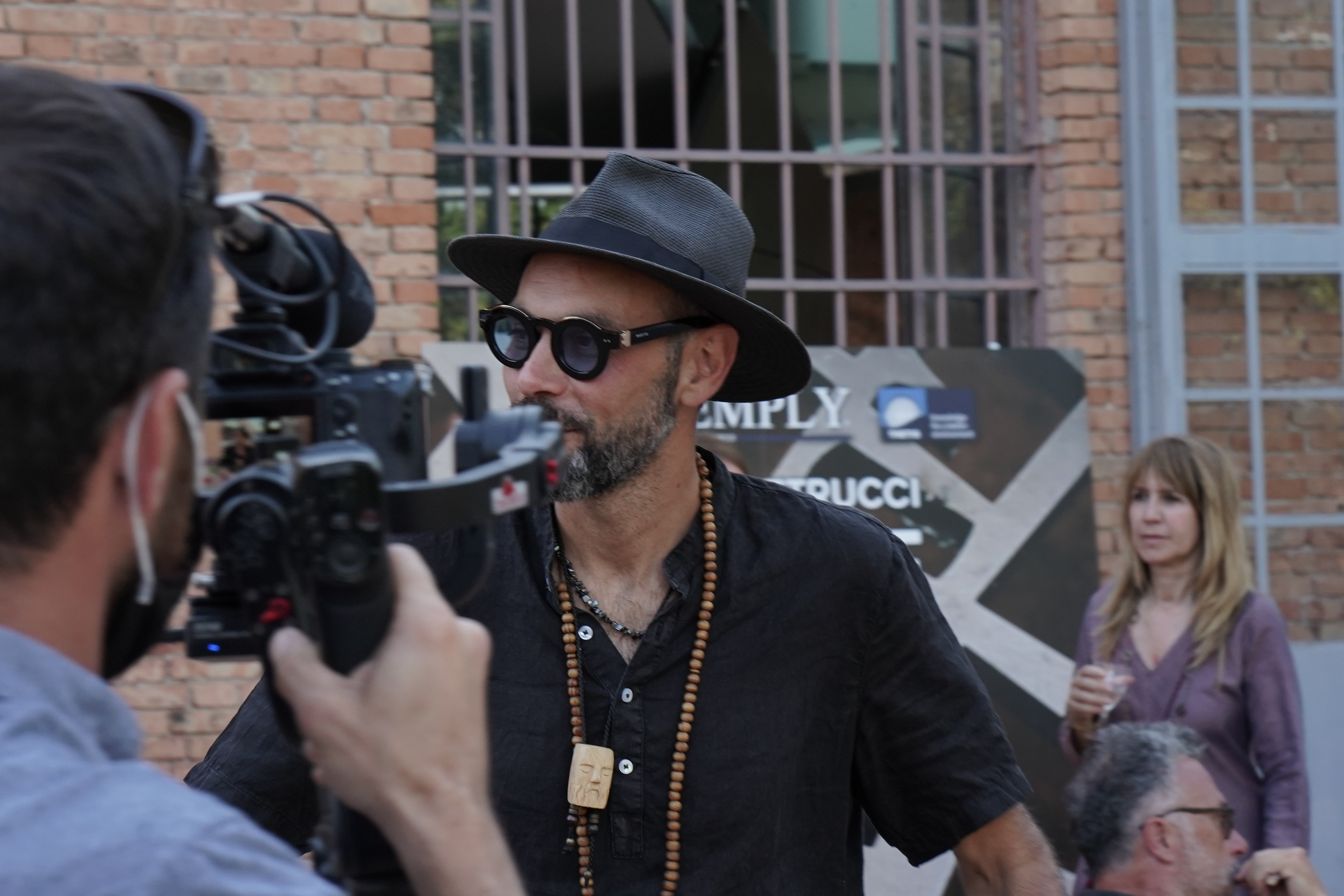
Nello Petrucci at the Venice Arsenal in 2021

Petrucci has exhibited numerous works at institutional venues, including L'arte come il film della vita at Palazzo Orsini di Gravina in Naples in 2010, La Grande Illusione at the Central Archives of the State in Rome in 2012, Convergenze Parallele at the Ex Polverificio Bourbon in Scafati in 2013, Kairos in 2017 at the Agora Gallery in New York, curated by Marcello Francolini. Pompei e i misteri dell’eterna bellezza at the Archaeological Park of Pompeii in 2019, Over the Sky at the Embassy of United States in Rome in 2019, which was reviewed by art critics Lara Caccia, Maria Letizia Paiato, Mary Angela Schroth and Mario Sesti, Il Canto di Circe in the San Domenico Maggiore in Naples in 2020, and in several galleries in New York and Shanghai.

In 2018, Petrucci exhibited the largest collage installation at the 3 World Trade Center in New York for the Silverstein Foundation Project, commissioned by Larry Silverstein. The installation involved international street artists such as Ron English, WhlsBe, Lauren YS, Layercake, and Chris RWK. His piece, The Essence of Lightness, is on permanent display in the building.

Petrucci has created several sculptures, mainly using iron and weathering steel. Margine, built in 2020, was installed at the Punta Campanella Lighthouse on the Gulf of Naples. Trame, which was built in 2021, is on permanent exhibition at the Venetian Arsenal, a museum which includes works from artists such as Michelangelo Pitoletto, Jean Fabre, Beverly Pepper, and others. On 8 February 2023, he inaugurated a sculpture dedicated to Chico Forti, on the occasion of his 64th birthday, created in marble and presented in Trento, in the presence of the authorities, and in connection with the tenor Andrea Bocelli.

=== Street art ===
Petrucci has produced numerous pieces of street art, including Sweet Home, which was created in Pompei in 2020, La Mano de Dios, which was painted inside the Stadio Diego Armando Maradona, and Red Zone, which was created in Pompei in 2021. In 2021, Petrucci painted Restiamo Umani in remembrance of Vittorio Arrigoni, who died in 2011. In 2021, Imago, a mural on display in Castellammare di Stabia, was vandalized three days after it was unveiled. While repairing the piece, Petrucci inserted the vandals into the artwork. Petrucci also painted Maschere in Castellammare di Stabia in 2021, which was dedicated to local poet and artist Raffaele Viviani. This mural inspired the art initiative Stabiae Street, which Petrucci is the art director of.

In the United States, Petrucci unveiled Attesa in Miami in 2022. The mural is dedicated to Chico Forti, who is detained in the United States and awaiting extradition back to Italy. Forti received the mural well, saying on his website, "if a photograph is worth a hundred words, a mural is worth a million".

=== Cinema ===
Petrucci has made various independent film projects, such as La Grande Illusione in 2013, Lost Love in 2017, and L’ultimo whisky con il cappellaio matto in 2020, for which he won the Silver Award for Best Fantasy Short Film at the Independent Short Awards, and was nominated for Best Short Film at the 2021 Globo d'oro Awards.
