= B. & M. Theocharakis Foundation =

Coordinates: 37.9762°N 23.7383°E

B. & M. Theocharakis Foundation for the Fine Arts and Music
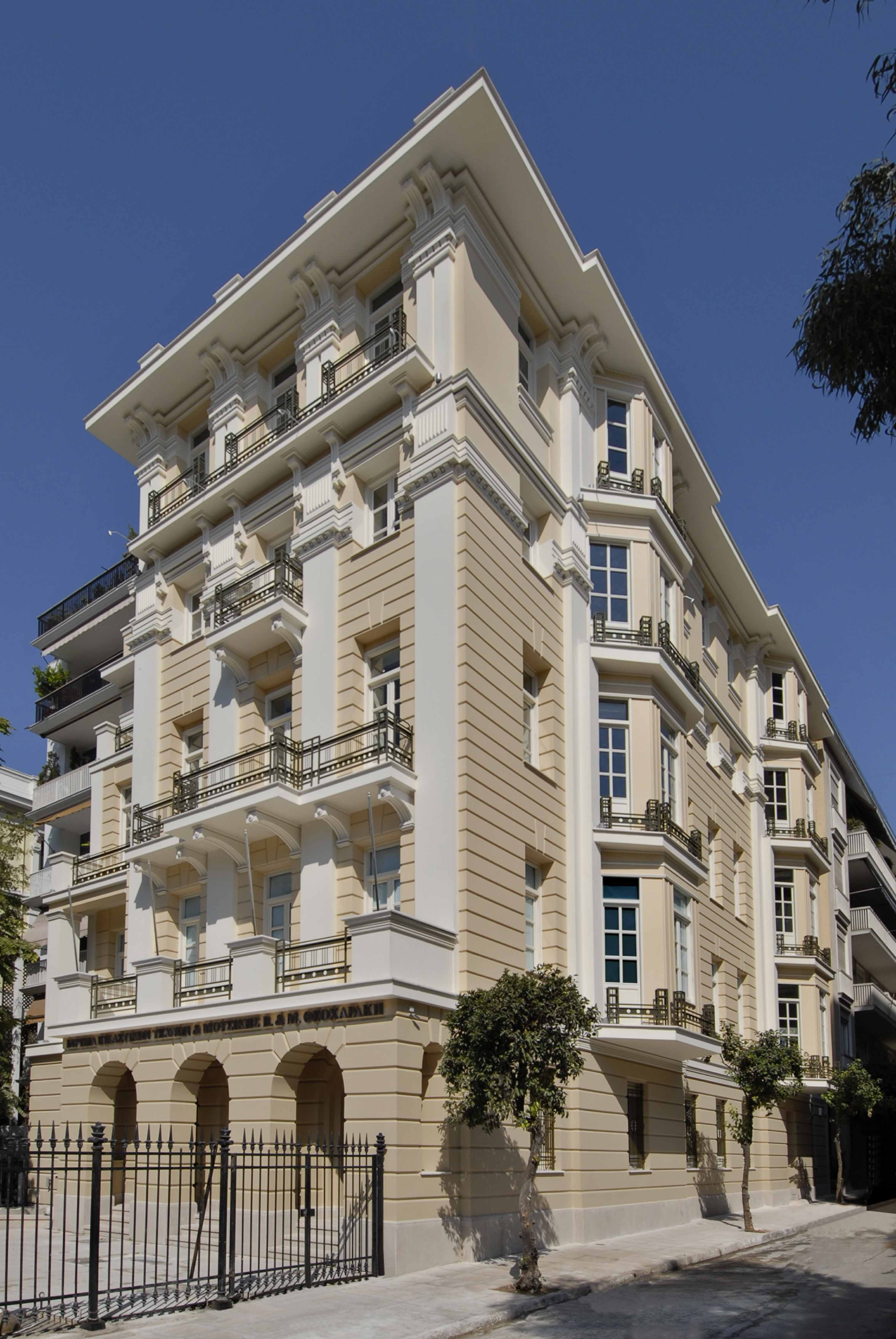
- Established: 2004
- Location: 9 Vasilissis Sofias & Merlin Street, Athens, 10671, Greece
- Type: Art Museum
- Website: thf.gr/en/

The B. & M. Theocharakis Foundation for the Fine Arts and Music (Greek: Ίδρυμα Εικαστικών Τεχνών και Μουσικής Βασίλη και Μαρίνας Θεοχαράκη) is a non-profit foundation and art museum based in Athens, Greece, focusing on the promotion of Fine Arts through cultural events and exhibitions.

== History and development ==
The foundation was established in 2004 by Basil Theocharakis, a Greek businessman, art collector and painter, and his wife Marina Theocharaki who is involved with art exhibitions and publications. In 2005, the foundation acquired Rentis Building, a listed building close to the site of the Hellenic Parliament in Athens city center. After restoration works accompanied by interior and exterior redesign occurred, the museum opened to the public on December 5, 2007, presenting a retrospective exhibition dedicated to painter Spyros Papaloukas (1892–1957).

The Foundation's main goals are:

- the promotion of Fine Arts, and Greek artists through events, exhibitions and collaborations with other cultural institutions
- Modernist art studies
- the evolution of Art through history

The bulk of its collection consisted of a large number of Papaloukas' works, mainly donated to the museum by his daughter.

== Building ==
The building housing the museum was built in the 1920s by architect Vassilis Tsagris, mainly based on the eclectic style of the Interwar period but also inspired by Art Nouveau and the so-called "Wagner School". It is known as Rentis Building, and it was acquired by the Theocharakis Foundation in 2005.
