= Spyros Papaloukas =

Spyros Papaloukas (Greek: Σπύρος Παπαλουκάς; Desfina, 1892 – Athens, 3 June 1957) was a renowned 20th-century Greek painter.

== Biography ==
Papaloukas was born in Desfina, Phocis and was orphaned by his father at the age of 6. As a child he learned the art of hagiography in his native town. In 1909 he was admitted to the Athens School of Fine Arts, where he studied until 1916 under the guidance of Georgios Roilos, Georgios Iakovidis, Stephanos Lantsas, Dimitrios Geraniotis and Pavlos Mathiopoulos. As a student he also painted icons for the temple of St. Demetrios of Desfina. From 1917 to 1921, he continued his studies in Paris at the Julian Academy and other art schools.

In 1921 he returned to Greece and accompanied the Greek Army in Asia Minor expedition as the official illustrator of the campaign along with Periklis Vyzantios and Pavlos Rodokanakis. His works from this period were exhibited at the Zappeion but almost all of them were lost in the destruction of Smyrna in 1922. It is estimated that they were around 500, of which very few sketches left. Returning from Asia Minor, he settled in Aegina, where he created a series of post-impressionist artworks.

In 1923, he visited Mount Athos, where, along with his friend Stratis Doukas, he stayed for a whole year (November 1923 till November 1924) painting the Athonian landscape, studying Byzantine painting and creating reproductions of many paintings of ecclesiastical art. A part of these artworks was exhibited in 1924 in Thessaloniki, in a hall of the White Tower. In 1925 he lived for six months in Lesvos and created a series of landscape paintings of villages and some portraits. He spent the summer of 1926 in Salamis, where he continued to paint landscapes.

In 1927 Papaloukas won the Panhellenic competition for the iconography of the cathedral of Evangelistria in Amfissa by decision of a commission consisted of architects Anastasios Orlandos, Dimitris Pikionis, Aristotelis Zachos and artist Konstantinos Parthenis. From 1927 he also created scenery and costumes for the National Theatre of Greece and painted murals on the facades of private houses and public buildings, such as The Blue Condominium of Exarcheia, where he was in charge of its colouring. During the 1930s and 1940s he displayed his works together with other painters of the "Art" Group (Greek: Ομάδα Τέχνη) and he was also a member of the publication committee of the art magazine The 3rd Eye.

In 1940 he was appointed as consultant of the City of Athens on urban planning and zoning issues, as well as director of the city's Municipal Gallery. From 1943 to 1951 he taught drawing courses at the School of Architecture of the National Technical University of Athens and in 1956 he was elected Professor of the Athens School of Fine Arts. He died in Athens in 1957.

The National Gallery of Greece organized an exhibition of his works in 1976 and the Cultural Centre of the Municipality of Athens honoured him in 1982. In November 2006, his daughter and sole heir, Asimina (Mina) Papaloukas, donated almost the entirety of his work to the B. & M. Theocharakis Foundation for Visual Arts and Music, whose founder (Basil Theocharakis) was a student of Papaloukas.

Spyros Papaloukas mainly painted landscapes, although he also created portraits, nudes, interiors and still lives as well as religious frescoes throughout his artistic career. He was very familiar with the artistic trends and artists of his time (Cézanne, etc.), but also with ancient and Byzantine art, which influenced him.

== Bibliography ==
- Καμπάνης, Μάρκος· Μιχαηλίδου, Μαίρη· Χανδρά, Κάτια Μ., ed. (2019). Σπύρος Παπαλουκάς. Σχέδια και μελέτες από ιδιωτικές συλλογές. Athens: Cultural Centre of MIET. ISBN 978-960-250-753-7
- Λαμπράκη-Πλάκα, Μαρίνα· Καρακούρτη-Ορφανοπούλου, Λαμπρινή, ed. (2020). Η ανθρώπινη μορφή στην ελληνική ζωγραφική, 20ός αιώνας. Athens: B. & M. Theocharakis Foundation. ISBN 978-618-5201-10-4
- Μαυρωτάς, Τάκης, ed. (2007). Σπύρος Παπαλουκάς. Athens: B. & M. Theocharakis Foundation. ISBN 978-960-7597-45-8
