= Pikes Hotel =

Luxury hotel in Ibiza, Balearic Islands of Spain

Pikes Ibiza
- Location within Ibiza

General information
- Location: Near, Sant Antoni de Portmany, Ibiza, Balearic Islands, Spain.
- Coordinates: 38°59′28.9″N 1°19′12.28″E
- Opening: 1978
- Owner: Andy McKay
- Operator: Ibiza Rocks

Technical details
- Floor count: Two

Other information
- Number of rooms: 26
- Number of restaurants: one (named Room 39) and two bars
- Parking: Yes

Website
- Pikes Hotel

Pikes is a luxury hotel in Ibiza, in the Balearic Islands of Spain. It is located in the countryside, 1.6 miles (2.6 km) to the northeast of the town of Sant Antoni de Portmany, and 10.2 miles (16.4 km) to the northwest of Ibiza Town. A 15th-century stone mansion which was a finca (farm estate), it was converted into a hotel in 1978 by British-born Australian Anthony Pike.

The hotel, cited as one of the most famous or infamous hotels on the island, developed a notorious reputation for hedonism in the 1980s, and is associated with being a playground for the rich and famous. It is best known for being the location of filming for Wham!'s 1983 hit "Club Tropicana" and for Freddie Mercury's 41st birthday bash in 1987, cited as one of the most lavish parties ever to be held on Ibiza.

By the 1990s the hotel had fallen into difficulties and after Pike's son was murdered in 1998 attempting to sell the hotel, it was later sold to the Ibiza Rocks organization, which also owns clubs on the island and the Ibiza Rocks Hotel in the nearby town. Today it has 26 rooms, and the restaurant, named Room 39, has earned critical acclaim on the island. A full biography of Tony Pike's life and the story behind the hotel is featured in Mr Pikes: The Story Behind the Ibiza Legend.

== History ==
Tony Pike (22 February 1934 - 24 February 2019) arrived in Ibiza in 1978. Yachtsman and former hat maker Pike led a very colourful life, which had already seen him shipwrecked in the Caribbean, injured in a bobsleigh accident, serving in the military, indulge in heavy drinking, and married and divorced three times. Pike had rented a finca for three months during which time he met his next partner Lyn. Together they bought a derelict finca called Ca’n Pep Toniet in the countryside east of Sant Antoni and they decided to renovate it into a hotel. Tony, along with Lyn and his two sons, did most of the work themselves. Bo Palk, the managing director of MGM Studios, checked into the hotel just as Pike was finishing the last bathroom of the hotel. An acquaintance of Palk's, Simon Napier-Bell, visited him at the hotel whilst scouting for a video shoot location. As a result, Wham!'s "Club Tropicana" was shot at the hotel in 1983. The video was directed by Duncan Gibbins with scenes shot of George Michael, the lead singer of the band and his fellow band member Andrew Ridgeley and their backing singers Dee C. Lee and Shirlie Holliman. The scenario saw George Michael "floating about on a lilo in his Speedoes and shades", relaxing with the boys by Pike's pool sipping cocktails. The scene of the trumpet-playing took place in the pool itself. Tony Pike got on well with the band, and was persuaded to take a small part in the video as the barman in one of the scenes. The success of the video and Wham!'s status at the time firmly placed Pike's Hotel in the circles of the music industry. Within a short time the hotel was attracting other stars as well as people connected to the music business.

In the 1980s, the authorities on Ibiza grew very concerned about the wild orgies and drug use which were taking place at the hotel. They showed particular concern over the extensive cocaine use at the hotel. In 1987, Freddie Mercury celebrated his 41st birthday at Pikes, several months after discovering that he had contracted HIV. Mercury sought much comfort at the retreat, and was a close friend of Pike. The party, held on 5 September 1987, has been described as "the most incredible example of excess the Mediterranean island had ever seen", and "the most lavish party even Pike had ever thrown." It has been cited as a legendary party, with a celebrity guest list of some 500 people and up to 700 people in total which included Julio Iglesias, Grace Jones, Jean-Claude Van Damme, Kylie Minogue, Nigel Benn, Anthony Quinn, Bon Jovi, Boy George, Five Star, Tony Curtis, Robert Plant, Naomi Campbell, and Spandau Ballet. A notable feature of the party was its thousands of gold and black helium balloons which reportedly took three days to inflate, and a grand firework display at the end which was reported to have been seen on Majorca. 350 bottles of Moet & Chandon champagne, and a cake in the shape of Gaudi's Sagrada Familia Cathedral were provided for the party, although the original cake collapsed and was replaced with a 2-metre-long sponge with the notes from Mercury's song "Barcelona". The bill, which included 232 broken glasses, was presented to Queen's manager, Jim Beach.

By the 1990s the hotel was beginning to lose its reputation and a slow decline in popularity began. In 1998, Pike had put the hotel up for sale. He signed a deal to sell it to the Italian TV producer Enrico Forti. His son, Anthony Dale Pike, flew to Miami to deal with Forti in person, since Tony had been diagnosed with AIDS-related dementia. Dale was killed on February 15, 1998, shot twice in the head and dumped in a secluded forest at Virginia Key beach. The police arrested and questioned Tony's longtime friend and Forti's neighbor, Thomas Heinz Knott, who was later convicted of running up $90,000 on Tony Pike's credit cards. In June 2000, Forti was convicted of murdering Anthony Dale Pike in Miami. Forti served his lifetime prison sentence at the Everglades Correctional Institution in Florida, until being moved to an Italian prison in 2024. In Italy, the guilty verdict has been viewed as a miscarriage of justice, because of the lack of a valid motive and solid proof because Italian media only presented Forti's version of the story without publishing the trial transcripts that Forti keeps secret.

Pike estimated that the hotel was worth $5 million (£3.2 million) in 2002. He later sold it to Ibiza Rocks in 2008. A television documentary, screened on Sky Living that same year, also showed him and the hotel in an unfavourable light, and it appeared to be living on its past reputation. In the summer of 2011, Pikes Hotel was re-launched as Ibiza Rocks House at Pikes Hotel. The hotel has been restored under the ownership Andy McKay, the man behind the Ibiza Rocks, Ibiza Rocks Hotel and Mallorca Rocks brands, with new décor, whilst trying to maintain its rock'n'roll image of its most glamorous years. The new owners made Tony Pike the first full-time resident of the hotel and he lived permanently in Room 25 until his death in 2019. Ibiza Rocks publicizes the hotel and its chain as "After sex and drugs, comes rock and roll." Scottish rockband Biffy Clyro and Australian pop singer Kylie Minogue stayed at the hotel during the Ibiza Rocks Festival in 2011.

== Features ==
Pikes Hotel is a luxury hotel, set in a 15th-century stone mansion, a finca, which was a farm for centuries. It is accessed off a long lane leading off the main road from Sant Antoni de Portmany. Stuart Husband of The Independent describes Pikes Hotel as "a notorious Ibiza hotel where anything goes". It is considered to be one of the most famous or infamous hotels on the island and has been cited as one of the "world's true spiritual homes of rock n’ roll hedonism". Iain Stewart of The Rough Guide to Ibiza considers Pikes Hotel to be an "almost legendary, relaxed and idiosyncratic rural hotel, popular with visiting celebrities". Anthony himself said: "it's been claimed we break every law, but I wouldn't be in business if that was the case." Boy George referred to Pike as the "Hugh Hefner of Ibiza".

Pikes Hotel has 26 rooms with king-sized beds, one restaurant named Room 39 which has received much critical acclaim, and two bars. As of 2009 it costs £157 to stay at the hotel. The rooms retain the sense of the original farmhouse, and are furnished in the Moroccan style with some heavy dark wood furnishings. The rooms each have different themes, including "Honeysuckle" and "Sunset", the latter of which is set behind the middle of three dark wood doors on the second floor of a small outhouse. According to author Stephen Armstrong, this room had a "modest sitting room with a huge antique mirror, plush sofas and a CD player which didn't work". The bedroom was enormous, and the bathroom was decorated in a vaguely Moroccan style with a curtained bath nestling behind a low arch.

A wide range of entertainment is put on at the hotel, from flamenco shows to costume balls. The hotel also offers a VIP card to visitors to many of the notable clubs, bars, and casinos in the town. The garden has a memorial to Anthony Dale Pike (1955–1998), which says, "In loving memory of eldest son Dale. Here a portion of his ashes are laid to rest while the remainder flow within the currents of his beloved Pacific Ocean. May his spirit strive no more but rest within this tree in peace and tranquility. I loved you, my son."
