= Vasilis Theocharakis =

Vasilis or Bassilis Theocharakis (Greek: Βασίλης Θεοχαράκης; 18 October 1930) is a Greek businessman and painter.

== Biography ==
Theocharakis was born in Piraeus in 1930 and studied law at the University of Athens. He graduated in 1957 on completion of his military service and has since been involved in the world of business (industry, insurance, health, shipping, etc.). In parallel with his studies, and despite his father's objections, he studied art for five years under the painter Spyros Papaloukas at his studio in Ano Patissia.

Theocharakis held his first exhibitions in 1957 at the International Youth Festival in Moscow and at the 5th Panhellenic Exhibition of Painting at Zappeion. He has since held individual and group exhibitions in Greece and abroad. His works include mainly oil paintings and watercolours of landscapes and seascapes. Theocharakis' paintings are held in public and private collections such as the National Gallery, the MOMus, the Teloglion Fine Arts Foundation, the Vorres Museum and the Pierides Collection. Theocharakis has received honours from the French and Japanese states as well as from the Ecumenical Patriarchate of Constantinople.

He is married to Marina Theocharakis, with whom he has two daughters, six grandchildren and one great-grandchild, and resides in Athens. In 2005 the couple founded the B. & M. Theocharakis Foundation in Athens.

== Bibliography ==
- Mavrotas, Takis. (2019) Basil Theocharakis: A Painter's Odyssey. Athens: MELISSA Publishing House. ISBN 978-960-204-394-3
