= Rentis Building =

- Μέγαρο Ρέντη (Greek)
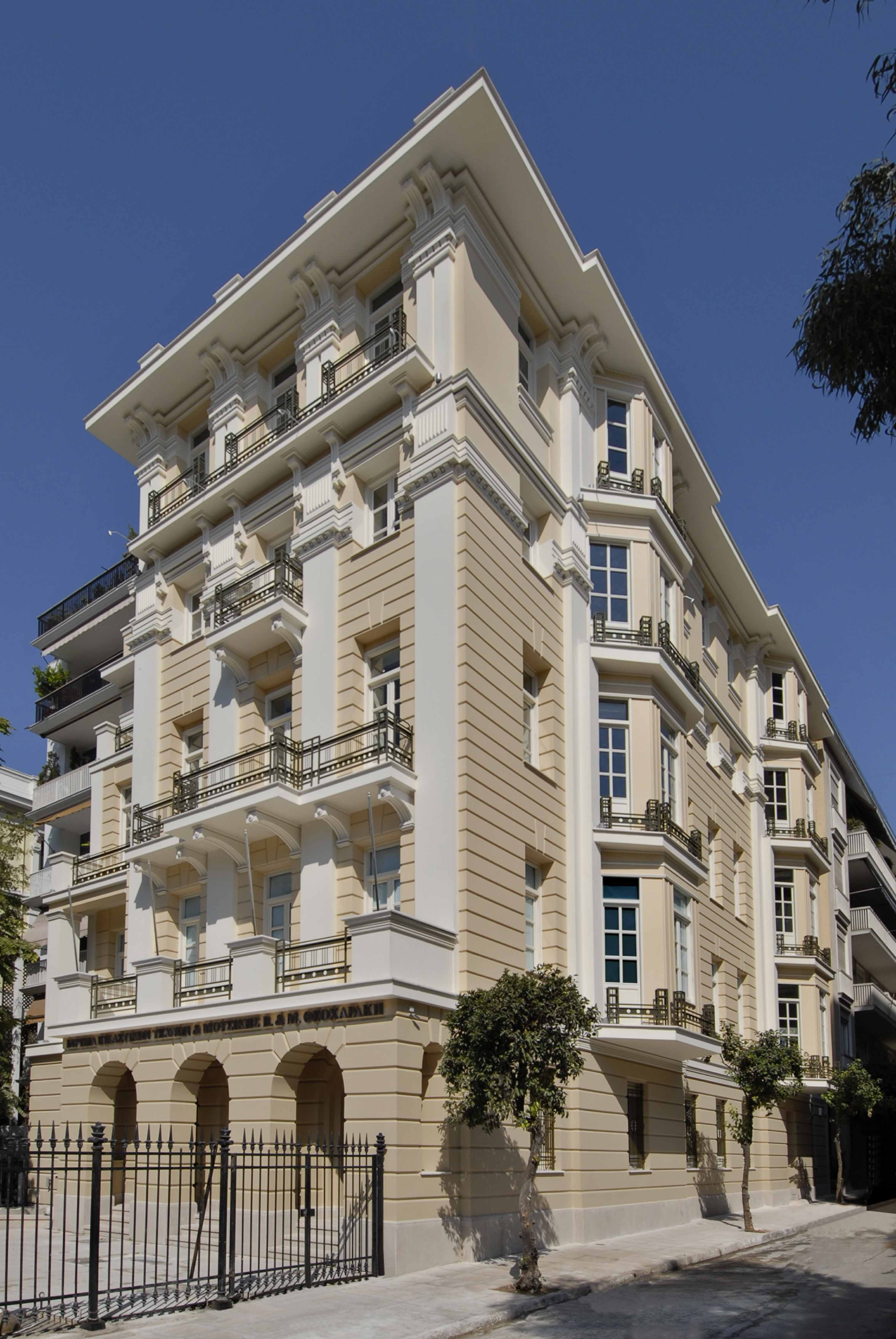

General information
- Town or city: Athens
- Country: Greece
- Coordinates: 37.975901°N 23.738382°E
- Completed: 1921

Rentis Building (Greek: Μέγαρο Ρέντη) is a preserved multi-story mansion in the center of Athens, Greece, housing the B. & M. Theocharakis Foundation.

== History ==
Located on the corner of Vasilissis Sofias Avenue and Merlin Street, it was built in 1928 by the Greek architect Vassilios Tsagris (1882 – 1941) at the request of Konstantinos Rentis (1884 – 1958) who was a prominent diplomat and politician. The building represents the eclectic style of the Interwar period although elements of Art Nouveau, the so-called "Wagner School" and other Europe-based styles are also visible. In 1985, it was classified by the Greek Ministry of Culture as a contemporary monument.

Through the years the building was transferred to various owners until 2005 when it was acquired by the B. & M. Theocharakis Foundation. The following years it was extensively restored and redesigned by architects Dimitris Ayiostratitis, P. Jonos and G. Choipel. Since late 2007 it has housed the foundation's headquarters and exhibits.

== Bibliography ==
- Iphigenia Vogiatzi, Niki Markasioti, Betty Chorianopoulou. English translation: Alexandra Dumas. Athens: City, People, Events - From the Photographic Archive of the National Historic Museum. Historical and Ethnological Society of Greece, Athens 2014
