= Chico Forti =

Italian sportsman and entrepreneur (born 1959)

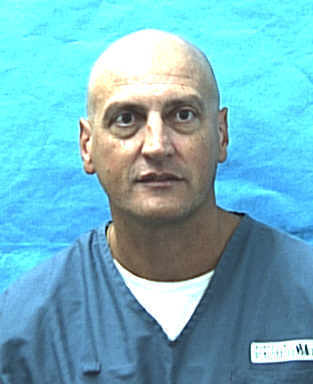
Mug shot of Forti

Enrico Forti (born February 8, 1959), also known as Chico Forti or Kiko Forti, is an Italian convicted murderer, former sportsman and entrepreneur. In 1997, he tried to buy the famous Pikes Hotel on the Mediterranean island of Ibiza. In June 2000, a Miami jury convicted Forti of shooting to death Dale Pike, the son of the founder of Pikes Hotel, Anthony "Tony" Pike.

== Background ==
Forti was born in Trento, Italy, where he lived until graduating from high school in 1978. In 1979, Forti started learning the sport of windsurfing on Lake Garda, the largest lake in Italy. With Robby Naish, he became one of the first in the world to loop (i.e. back flip complete with the windsurf board), at Diamond Head, Hawaii (1984). Forti helped to design and produce the first windsurf jump ramp (funboard). In 1985, he was the first Italian to compete for the windsurfing world cup.

In 1987, a car accident interrupted his windsurfing career. Following a long convalescence, Forti began producing extreme sports films. He wrote for sports magazines, and appeared on various sports television shows. In 1990, he created a production company that broadcast on ESPN and elsewhere, specializing in extreme sports. Also in 1990, Forti appeared in the Telemike television quiz show and won a large sum of money. That enabled him to move in 1992 to the United States. He divorced his Italian wife, and married a model with whom he has three children.

== Murder of Dale Pike in Florida ==
In 1998, Forti was in process of buying the Pikes Hotel in Ibiza from the owner, Anthony Pike. Pike's son Dale flew to Miami in February 1998 to find out what was going on, after he discovered a fax where his father (who had dementia) apparently signed the hotel and resort over to Forti. The body of Dale Pike, son of Anthony Pike, was found on February 15, 1998, at Virginia Key in Florida. Prosecutors provided cell phone records showing Forti was near the beach where the body was found, as well as a small sample of sand found in Forti's vehicle which matched the unique sand from Virginia Key. They also provided airport paging records confirming that Forti and Pike had been communicating over the airport intercom system, thus proving that Forti was lying when he denied having picked Dale Pike up at the airport.

Forti was sentenced to life in a Florida prison for killing Dale Pike, and state courts rejected his appeals on the murder conviction. While Forti began serving his sentence of life without parole, the press in his native Italy compared his case to that of Amanda Knox, an American living in Italy who was famously convicted of murder based upon little evidence. Forti claims the Miami Dade Police Department, prosecutor Reid Rubin and judge Victoria Platzer fabricated evidence to punish him for his documentary on Versace's killer Andrew Cunanan.

Forti claims lieutenant John Campbell, detective Confesor Gonzalez and detective Katherine Carter fabricated false evidence against him and told him "You're the Italian who accused the Miami police, you will never see your kids again". Forti also claims the Miami Dade police officers ripped the photos of his kids and spat on them. Italian media supported Forti's innocence against Miami Dade police until criminologist Marco Strano published a report about the investigation and trial to prove there was no conspiracy against Forti.

Early on in the investigation, police had arrested and questioned Tony's longtime friend and Forti's neighbor, Thomas Heinz Knott, who was later convicted of running up $90,000 on Tony Pike's credit cards. In Italian media, the verdict against Forti has been viewed as a miscarriage of justice, because of the lack of a valid motive and solid proof. However, the trial of the American transcripts were not published. Italian court of justice confirmed the decision of the US court.

== Requested transfer to Italian jail ==
The U.S. Department of Justice and the Italian government requested that Florida transfer Forti to prison in Italy; in December 2020, Florida Governor Ron DeSantis conditionally approved transferring Forti to Italy, over the objections of Miami-Dade prosecutors. The transfer was conditioned upon an assurance from the Italian government that Forti would complete the prison sentence given to him in Florida, plus consent of the victim's next of kin. In Italy, life without parole is illegal. DeSantis's move led commentators to predict Forti would be released from jail. Forti's transfer to Italy was therefore impeded because Italy's internal jurisdiction would allow Forti to receive a reduced sentence. On March 1, 2024, Italian Prime Minister Giorgia Meloni announced during her mission in the US that an agreement upon Forti's release and return to Italy was reached. Forti was flown to Italy in May 2024, and is now serving his sentence at a prison in Verona.

== Mafia connections ==
Enrico Forti allegedly asked the Mafia clan known as 'ndrangheta to silence two journalists, Marco Travaglio and Selvaggia Lucarelli, who published articles about his criminal records. An investigation was opened.
