= Pavlos Rodokanakis =

Italian born Greek painter

Pavlos Rodokanakis (Greek: Παύλος Ροδοκανάκης, Italian: Paolo Rodocanachi; 29 May 1891 – 16 May 1958) was an Italian-born Greek painter.

== Biography ==
Rodokanakis was born in Genoa in 1891 and came from a large wealthy family.

He started his artistic education as a student of Giuseppe Pennasilico (1861–1940) in his hometown. Later on he studied painting under Giulio Bargellini (1875–1936) and graphics under Vittorio Grassi (1878–1958) at the Accademia di Belle Arti di Roma (Academy of Fine Arts Rome).

In 1911 Rodokanakis made his debut at an exhibition of the Società Promotrice di Belle Arti (Society for the Promotion of Fine Arts) in Genoa. He later moved to Greece, his parents' country. Due to the armed conflicts there during the First World War, the artist ended up in Görlitz in 1916 as a soldier as part of the Greek IV Army Corps transferred to Germany. Although he lived in a barrack camp for two years, he managed to be productive creatively. His efforts to distinguish himself as a painter resulted in an invitation to Munich in the summer of 1918. There, in Munich`s Glaspalast (Glass Palace), Rodokanakis took part in the annual art exhibition. The success in Munich led to another exhibition in the Stadthalle (town hall) Görlitz in November 1918, which showed more than 50 of his works and which was extremely well received.

After returning to Greece, Rodokanakis joined the artist group Omada Tehni (Techni Group), founded in 1917. This enabled him to take part in an art exhibition in Paris in 1919 that presented contemporary Greek art. This major showing was opened personally by the then Greek prime minister Eleftherios Venizelos, who was present due to peace negotiations in the French capital. In the same year, a solo exhibition of some of the painter's works took place in the premises of the Athens daily newspaper Eleftheros Typos.

In the course of the Greco-Turkish War, Rodokanakis, along with the artists Spyros Papaloukas (1892–1957) and Periklis Vyzantios (1893–1972), took part in an anti-Turkish campaign as an official war painter between 1921 and 1922. The work of the three artists, which was created during this period and was briefly exhibited, was destroyed due to the acts of war in Smyrna and the great fire there in 1922.

In 1923 Rodokanakis left Greece for good and moved to his native town of Genoa. Back in Italy, he managed to establish himself as an important painter. In the following years, he participated in several exhibitions where either only his work was presented or his work was shown together with those of other artists. In the years 1935, 1939, 1948 and 1952 he took part in the highly regarded national exhibitions of the Quadriennale in Rome. His participation in the Venice Biennale in 1934, 1940 and 1948, in which he represented either Greece or his chosen home Italy, received particular attention.

Rodokanakis was married to the translator and writer Lucia Rodocanachi (1901–1978), née Morpurgo.

The painter died in Genoa in 1958.

== Work ==
The oeuvre of Rodokanakis is mainly characterized by landscape depictions but also figure painting. There are unmistakable references to symbolism and Art Nouveau, especially in his early creations. Many works have an impressionistic touch.

His typical painting style is an atmospherical, sometimes few opaque colorouring applied with a light brush stroke.

Works by him are for example kept in the National Gallery in Athens, in the Museum of the City of Athens, in the Leventis Gallery in Nicosia and in the Galleria Nazionale d'Arte Moderna (National Gallery of Modern and Contemporary Art) in Rome.

== Honours ==
In Arenzano, a comune in the Metropolitan City of Genoa, a town square was named after the artist.

== Referenced books ==
- Vollmer, Hans (Editor): Allgemeines Lexikon der bildenden Künstler des 20. Jahrhunderts, part 4, Quaghebeur – Uzelac, Leipzig 1992, ISBN 3-423-05907-9.
- Bénézit, Emmanuel (Editor): Dictionnaire critique et documentaire des peintres, sculpteurs, dessinateurs et graveurs […], Paris 1999.
- Alexatos, Gerassimos: Die Griechen von Görlitz 1916–1919, Berlin 2018, ISBN 978-3-7329-0414-3.
