= Thanasis Deligiannis =

Greek transdisciplinary artist (born 1983)

Thanasis Deligiannis Θανάσης Δεληγιάννης
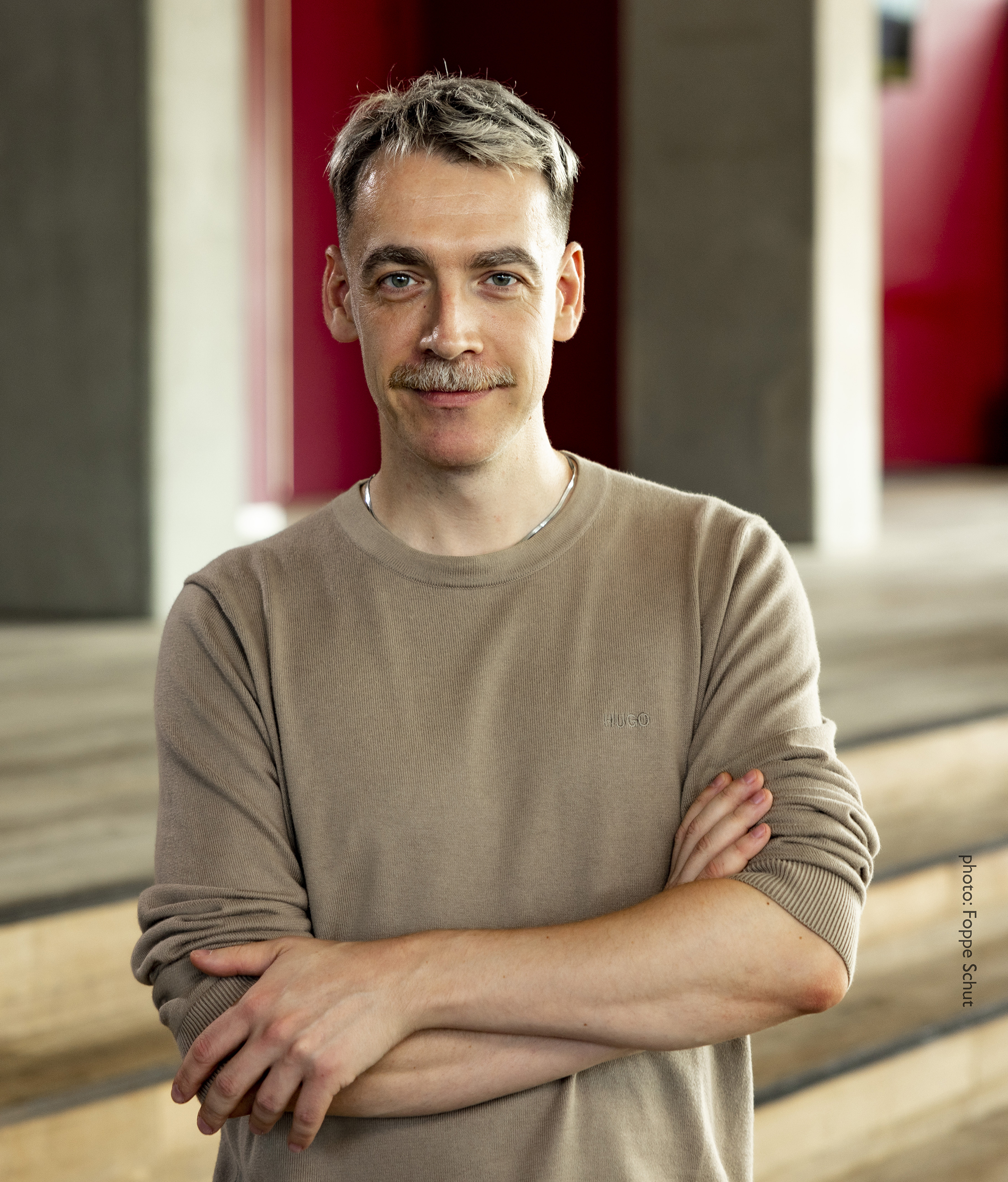

Background information
- Born: July 29, 1983 (age 43); Larissa, Greece
- Years active: 2001-present
- Website: thanasisdeligiannis.com

Thanasis Deligiannis (Greek: Θανάσης Δεληγιάννης; born 1983) is a Greek transdisciplinary artist, composer, and director based in Amsterdam. His work blends installation and performance, acoustic and electronic music, urban and rural culture.

== Early life and education ==
Thanasis Deligiannis was born in Larissa, Greece. He studied composition and music theatre at the Department of Music Science and Art at the University of Macedonia in Thessaloniki, with Dimitris Terzakis, Giorgos Kyriakakis, and Sofia Karakantza. In 2007 he moved to the Netherlands to pursue his master's degree in composition with Wim Henderickx at the Conservatorium van Amsterdam, part of the Amsterdam University of the Arts.

== Career ==
Deligiannis' work that combines music, performance and visual composition has been described in the NRC Handelsblad noting that his creative process “does not begin with a sound idea, but with images”.

In 2013, Deligiannis and colleagues, co-founded Foundation I/O, a platform for interdisciplinary art and research. He collaborated with theatre director and archaeologist Efthimis Theou on works situated at the intersection of performance and archaeology. Their project The Meal, first presented at the Neolithic site of Koutroulou Magoula in Greece, was later shown at the National Museum of Contemporary Art (EMST) in Athens.

Between 2016 and 2017, he served as artistic director of RE-FUSE, a research platform for experimental music theatre co-organised by the Greek National Opera and Gaudeamus. He later collaborated with Tanztheater Wuppertal Pina Bausch under Dimitris Papaioannou.

In 2012, he was an artist-in-residence sponsored by the New York Foundation for the Arts to partner with the Ekmeles Vocal Ensemble, and had a residency at Gaudeamus in 2017 to 2019 through the Nieuwe Makers programme. He was later an artist-in-residence at the Muziekgebouw Productiehuis (2024).

In 2022, Deligiannis collaborated with Yannis Michalopoulos on the Margaroni Residency, a long-term artistic research commissioned and funded by Onassis Culture. Building on ideas first explored in his work ENA ENA (2021), the project examined rural sound culture in Greece through field recordings, archival materials, and the life of folk singer Kiki Margaroni, and later formed the basis for Xirómero/Dryland (2024) and Nightwater (2025).

In 2024, Deligiannis and Michalopoulos conceived Xirómero/Dryland for the Greek Pavilion at the 60th Venice Biennale and created the collaborative installation along with four other Greek artists. The work combined video, sound, water, and a functioning industrial agricultural machine that interacted with the installation in real time. In a review in e-flux stated that the work “destabilize[s] any division between reality and its representations.” Xirómero/Dryland has also been described as “a cryptic and sometimes poetic image of a part of Greek reality that remains largely invisible to outsiders.”

In 2025, Deligiannis presented Nightwater at the Muziekgebouw aan ’t IJ in Amsterdam. Developed during a residency at the venue’s production house, the immersive installation transformed the building into an environment of sound, light, and performance with live music including Ensemble Klang. The work continued to explore aspects of agricultural life and contemporary rural culture within urban settings.

Since 2018 he has taught at the Conservatorium van Amsterdam.

== Selected works ==
Yriaeas (2010) is a composition for mixed wind ensemble, commissioned by the Asko/Schönberg Ensemble. The work premiered at the Conservatorium van Amsterdam, and was later performed at the Onassis Stegi and the Megaron Athens Concert Hall.

Theou's and Deligiannis' site specific performance piece, The Meal (2011), was created at the Neolithic site of Koutroulou Magoula, Greece. It was later adapted for exhibition at the National Museum of Contemporary Art, Athens (EMΣT) and the Young Artists Biennial - Mediterranea 17 (Milano 2015). Frieze described this cross-cultural work as an “idiosyncratic narration about the history of food sourced from archaeological findings, local interviews and TV pop culture.”

His work, re- (2018) was a music-theatre performance that premiered at Gaudeamus Festival. The Wire described re- as a “real festival highlight,” noting its surreal staging and comparing it to “a Mediterranean Fawlty Towers reimagined by Jacques Tati and Robert Ashley.”

Deligiannis' work ENA ENA (2021) premiered at Onassis Stegi in Athens, and was performed throughout the Netherlands and Cyprus. This hybrid music-theatre work stages Greek panighíria – folk rural open-air festivals – through live ensemble, electronics, and spatialized sound. The Greek newspaper efsyn described it as a performance that "questions of how the atmosphere of a village feast can be transferred into an art-institution setting, and whether popular Dionysian energy and high-art expression can meet.”

== Discography ==
- Communicational Entropy / Andromeda, Kaja Draksler – The Live Of Many Others (Clean Feed, 2013)
- A bit Unfair, Seldom Sene – Not A Single Road (Brilliant Classics, 2019) The Volkskrant described it as “a modern but stunning piece,” and American Recorder noted that the work used microtonality, and an “array of vocal and instrumental timbres””
- An Onion Of No Return, Sterre Konijn – Een (7 Mountain Records, 2021)

== Publications ==
- BESTIARIO: a theater/archaeology performance at the Prehistoric settlement of Gournia, Crete – E. Theou, T. Metaxa, T. Deligiannis & D. Mylona (Kentro by INSTAP-SCEC, 2023)
- Panel discussions and interviews / Disembordering the Musical Field, Paul Craenen & Michiel Schuijer – Shifting Boundaries, Situating Contemporary Music Practices (November Music, 2023)
