= Yannis Mitarakis =

Greek landscape painter

Yannis Mitarakis (Greek: Γιάννης Μυταράκης; Alexandria, Egypt, 1897/98 - Athens, Greece, 1963) was a Greek landscape painter.

== Biography ==
He was born in 1897 or 1898 in Alexandria and he was member of the Greek community of Egypt. He studied agronomy in Paris from 1915 till 1921. During his years in Paris he took painting courses at A. Lohre Academy and La Palette.

Mitarakis exhibition activity started in 1922 in France. He returned to Greece in 1929 and settled in Athens where he spent the rest of his life. He was member of various Greek artistic groups and contributed to many domestic and international exhibitions. Mitarakis participated to the Biennale of Venice (1934, 1936 and 1940), Biennale of São Paulo (1958), Alexandria etc., the Guggenheim's contest (along with fellow Greeks artists Yiannis Spyropoulos, Panayiotis Tetsis, Spyros Vassiliou and Giorgos Gounaropoulos) etc. He died in Athens on 23 February 1963.

Yiannis Mitarakis dealt mainly with landscape painting. His basic inspiration was the Greek landscape. He also formulated an expressionist idiom where fauve colours dominate.

== Bibliography ==
- Greek landscape, 19th - 20th century, National Gallery and Alexandros Soutzos Museum, Athens, 1998.
