= Devin (name) =

- Pronunciation: /ˈdɛvɪn/
- Gender: Unisex

Origin
- Origin: Irish, Celtic, Latin
- Meaning: "fawn, poet, divine"

Other names
- Variant forms: Devyn, Devynne, Devinne, Devan, Deavan/Deaven, Deven
- Related names: Devon

Devin is a unisex English-language given name with multiple origins.

One origin for Devin is from the surname Devin, which is an anglicization of the Irish patronymic Ó Damháin. The Irish patronymic is in reference to the given name 'damán allaid' meaning "fawn", or "poet".

A separate and unrelated root for Devin is from a nickname, based on Old French devin, "divine" (Latin dīvīnus).

As a masculine given name, Devin became somewhat popular in the United States during the 1980s to 2000s, peaking at rank 59 in 1997. During this time, Devin also began to see some use as a feminine given name. Feminine usage peaked in 1991, at rank 238, or 28% of masculine usage.

== People called Devin ==
=== Men ===
==== A-C ====
- Devin Allen (fl. 2010s–2020s), American photographer, photojournalist, and activist
- Devin Aromashodu (born 1984), American football player
- Devin Asiasi (born 1997), American football player
- Devin Askew (born 2002), American basketball player
- Devin Augustine (born 2003), sprinter from Trinidad and Tobago
- Devin Barclay (born 1983), American soccer and football player
- Devin Battley (born 1950), American businessman and motorcycle racer and dealer
- Devin Beliveau (fl. 2010s), American politician and schoolteacher
- Devin Booker (born 1996), American basketball player
- Devin Booker (basketball, born 1991), American basketball player
- Devin Bowen (born 1972), American tennis player
- Devin Boyce (born 1996), American soccer player
- Devin Boyd (born 1970), American basketball player
- Devin Britton (born 1991), American tennis player
- Devin Bronson (born 1983), American guitarist, songwriter, and producer
- Devin Brooks (born 1992), American basketball player
- Devin Brown (born 1978), American basketball player
- Devin Bush Sr. (born 1973), American football player
- Devin Bush Jr. (born 1998), American football player
- Devin Caherly (fl. 2010s–2020s), American social media personality and businessperson
- Devin Cannady (born 1996), American basketball player
- Devin Carney (born 1984), American politician
- Devin Carter (born 2002), American basketball player
- Devin Clark (American football) (born 1986), American football player
- Devin Clark (fighter) (born 1990), American mixed martial artist
- Devin Cole (born 1976), American mixed martial artist
- Devin Copeland (born 1970), American rapper who uses the stage name Devin the Dude
- Devin Culp (born 2000), American football player

==== D-G ====
- Devin Davis (basketball, born 1974), American/Spanish basketball player
- Devin Davis (basketball, born 1995), American basketball player
- Devin Davis (musician) (fl. 2000s), American indie musician
- Devin Dawson (born 1989), American country music singer and songwriter
- Devin DeHaven (born 1970), American television director and producer
- Devin Del Do (born 1986), American soccer player
- Devin Deweese (born 1956), American professor of Islamic and Central Eurasian Studies in Indiana
- Devin DiDiomete (born 1988), Canadian-born Italian ice hockey player
- Devin Dodson (born 1999), American stock car racing driver
- Devin Dreeshen (born 1987/1988), Canadian politician
- Devin Druid (born 1998), American actor
- Devin Durrant (born 1960), American basketball player
- Devin Duvernay (born 1997), American football player
- Devin Dwyer (born 1982/1983), American digital reporter and television journalist
- Devin Eatmon (fl. 2010s–2020s), American operatic tenor
- Devin Ebanks (born 1989), American basketball player
- Devin Edgerton (born 1970), Canadian ice hockey centre
- Devin Faraci, American film critic, writer
- Devin Finzer (born 1990), American entrepreneur and technology executive
- Devin Lahardi Fitriawan (born 1983), Indonesian badminton player
- Devin Friedman (fl. 2000s–2010s) American journalist
- Devin Fuller (born 1994), American football player
- Devin Funchess (born 1994), American football player
- Devin Gaines (1984–2007), American college student and drowning victim
- Devin Galligan (1972–2003), American charity founder
- Devin Gardner (born 1991), American football quarterback
- Devin Gibson (born 1987), American music video and film director
- Devin Gibson (basketball) (born 1989), American professional basketball player
- Devin Goda (born 1989), American male model and former football player
- Devin Graham (born 1983), American videographer
- Devin Gray (basketball) (1972–2013), American basketball player
- Devin Gray (American football) (born 1995), American football wide receiver
- Devin Grayson (fl. 1990s–2020s), American writer of comic books and novels
- Devin Green (born 1982), American basketball player
- Devin Griffin (born 1984), British DJ

==== H-R ====
- Devin Haney (born 1998), American boxer
- Devin Harjes (1983–2025), American film and television actor
- Devin Harper (born 1998), American football player
- Devin Harris (born 1983), American basketball player
- Devin Hester (born 1982), American football player
- Devin Hoff (fl. 2000s–2020s), American bassist, composer, and arranger
- Devin Holland (born 1988), American football safety
- Devin Patrick Kelley (1991–2017), American mass shooter in the Sutherland Springs church shooting
- Devin Jones (born 1994), American professional stock car and sports car racing driver
- Devin Kaplan (born 2004), American ice hockey player
- Devin Leary (born 1999), American football player
- Devin Lebsack (fl. 2000s–2010s), American drummer
- Devin LeMahieu (born 1972), American businessman and Republican politician
- Devin Lemons (born 1979), American football linebacker
- Devin Lloyd (born 1998), American football linebacker
- Devin Lucien (born 1993), American football player
- Devin McCourty (born 1987), American football player
- Devin McCuin (born 2005), American football player
- Devin McEwan (born 1984), American slalom canoeist
- Devin McGlamery (born 1982), American Christian musician
- Devin Mesoraco (born 1988), American baseball catcher and coach
- Devin Moore (American football) (born 1985), American football running back
- Devin Moore (murderer) (born 1985), American convicted murderer
- Devin N. Morris (born 1986), American artist
- Devin Mullings (born 1985), Bahamian professional tennis player
- Devin E. Naar (fl. 2010s), American Jewish studies scholar
- Devin Nunes (born 1973), American politician
- Devin Oliver (born 1992), American basketball player
- Devin Pepper (born 1969), U.S. Space Force brigadier general
- Devin Perales (born 1993), American soccer player
- Devin Powell (born 1988), mixed martial arts fighter
- Devin Rask (born 1978), Canadian ice hockey player and coach
- Devin Ratray (born 1977), American actor
- Devin Richardson (born 1999), American football player
- Devin Robinson (born 1995), American basketball player
- Devin Royal (born 2004), American basketball player

==== S-Z ====
- Devin Sanchez (born 2006), American football player
- Devin Sarno (born 1966), American musician
- Devin Scillian (born 1963), American television journalist, musician, and children's author
- Devin Searcy (born 1989), American basketball player
- Devin Setoguchi (born 1987), Canadian hockey player
- Devin Shore (born 1994), Canadian ice hockey forward
- Devin Sibley (born 1996), American basketball player
- Devin Singletary (born 1997), American football player
- Devin Smeltzer (born 1995), American professional baseball pitcher
- Devin Smith (American football) (born 1992), American football player
- Devin Smith (basketball) (born 1983), American player in the Israeli Super League
- Devin J. Stewart (fl. 1980s–2010s), American professor of Islamic studies and Arabic language and literature
- Devin Stone (fl. 2000s–2020s), American lawyer and YouTuber
- Devin Street (born 1991), American football wide receiver
- Devin Sweetney (born 1987), American basketball player
- Devin Talbott (born 1976), American entrepreneur and private investor
- Devin Taylor (American football) (born 1989), American football player
- Devin Terhune (fl. 2000s–2020s), English cognitive neuroscientist
- Devin Therriault (born 1988/89), American musician
- Devin Thomas (born 1986), American football player
- Devin Thomas (basketball) (born 1994), American basketball player
- Devin Toner (born 1986), Irish rugby union player
- Devin Townsend (born 1972), Canadian musician, songwriter and record producer
- Devin Tyler (born 1986), American player of both American and Canadian football
- Devin Vargas (born 1981), American boxer
- Devin Vassell (born 2000), American basketball player
- Devin Vega (born 1998), Puerto Rican soccer player
- Devin Voisin (born 2001), American football player
- Devin G. Walker (fl. 2000s–2020s), American theoretical particle physicist
- Devin Wenig (born 1966), American businessman, CEO of eBay
- Devin White (born 1998), American football player
- Devin Williams (baseball) (born 1994), American baseball pitcher
- Devin Williams (basketball) (born 1994), American basketball player
- Devin Wilson (born 1990), indoor football wide receiver
- Devin Wyman (born 1973), American football player

=== Women ===
- Devin Adair, American writer, director and producer
- Devin Alexander (fl. 2000s–2020s), American chef, author and media personality
- Devin DeVasquez (born 1963), American actress and model
- Devin Grayson (born 1970), American writer of comic books and novels
- Devin Halbal (born 1998), American TikTok travel vlogger, writer, and community organizer
- Devin Kelley (born 1986), American actress
- Devin Lane, American model, pornographic actress, writer, director and producer
- Devin Logan (born 1993), American freeskier
- Devin Mills (fl. 1980s–2020s), American actress
- Froskurinn (born Devin Ryanne Mohr; 1991/1992), American color commentator
- Devin Tailes (born 1989), American singer (stage name Dev)
- Devin Taylor (wrestler) (born 1988), American model, actress, television personality, and professional wrestler

== Surname ==
- Bill Devin (1915–2000), American businessperson, automotive entrepreneur and racing driver
- Thomas Devin (1822–1878), American brevet major general
- William A. Devin (1871–1959), American jurist, Associate Justice and Chief Justice of the North Carolina Supreme Court
- William F. Devin (1898–1982), American politician, mayor of Seattle

== See also ==
- Devon (given name)
- Devon (surname)
