= Devin =

Devin may refer to:

== Places ==
=== Iran ===
- Devin, Minab, a village in Hormozgan Province
- Devin, North Khorasan, a village in North Khorasan Province
- Devin, Razavi Khorasan, a village in Razavi Khorasan Province

=== Slovakia ===
- Devín, a borough of Bratislava
  - Devín Castle
- Devín Gate, a natural gate in the Danube valley at the border of Slovakia and Austria

=== Elsewhere ===
- Devin, Bulgaria, a town
- Duino (Slovene: Devin), a seaside resort, Italy
- Děvín, a mountain in the Czech Republic
- Camp Devin, Montana, a temporary United States Army camp established in 1878

== People ==
- Devin (name), a list of people with the given name or surname
- Devin the Dude (born 1970), American hip hop artist Devin Copeland
- Devin Townsend (born 1972), Canadian metal artist

== Other uses ==
- Devin AI, an artificial intelligence software engineer
- Devin Enterprises, an American manufacturer of cars and kit-cars

== See also ==
- Devins (disambiguation)
- Devon (disambiguation)
