= Deven =

Deven can be a variant of the Indian masculine given name Devendra. It may also refer to:

== Surname ==
- Chimbu Deven (formerly Simbudevan), Tamil film director
- Mandy Van Deven (born 1980), American writer and activist

== Given name ==
- Deven Bhojani (born 1969), Indian TV serial actor/director
- Deven Eastern (born 2003), American football player
- Deven Green (born 1975), Canadian-American comedian, comedy writer and musician
- Deven May (born 1971), American Broadway performer, actor and photographer
- Deven Nagalingum, Mauritian politician
- Deven Sharma (born 1956), Indian-American business executive, president of Standard & Poor's
- Deven Thompkins (born 1999), American football player
- Deven Verma (1937–2014), Indian film and television actor, particularly known for his comic roles

== See also ==
- De Ven
- Dev-Em
- Devein
- Devena
- Devens (disambiguation)
- Devina
- Devine (disambiguation)
- Devon (disambiguation)
- Devona (disambiguation)
- Devonne
- Dive In
- Teuven
