= Doon =

Doon may refer to:

== Arts and entertainment ==
- "Doon" (lai), a 13th-century Breton lai
- Doon de Mayence, a fictional hero of the Old French chansons de geste
- Doon Harrow, a main character in the series Books of Ember
- National Lampoon's Doon, a novel by Ellis Weiner, parodying Frank Herbert's Dune

== People ==
- Doon Arbus (born 1945), American writer and journalist
- Doon Mackichan (born 1962), British actress and comedian

== Places ==
=== India ===
- Doon (Vidhan Sabha constituency), Himachal Pradesh
- Doon Valley, a valley in the Sivalik foothills of the Himalayas

=== Ireland ===
- Doon, County Cavan, three townlands, including:
  - Doon (Drumreilly)
  - Doon (Tomregan)
- Doon, County Limerick, a village
- Doon, County Offaly, a village
- Doon, County Westmeath, a townland in Lickbla civil parish

=== Scotland ===
- Loch Doon
- River Doon

=== United States ===
- Doon, California, a settlement on the defunct Butte County Railroad
- Doon, Iowa

=== Elsewhere ===
- Doon, Ontario, Canada, a neighbourhood of Kitchener
- Doon, Iran, a village in Hormozgan Province
- Doon River, New Zealand
- Doon, County Londonderry, a townland in County Londonderry, Northern Ireland
- Doon, a crater on Mars

== Schools ==
- Doon Academy, a secondary school in Dalmellington, Scotland
- Doon International School (disambiguation), three schools in India
- Doon University, in Dehradun, Uttarakhand, India
- The Doon School, a private boarding school in Dehradun, Uttarakhand, India

== Other uses ==
- Doon GAA, a Gaelic Athletic Association club in Doon, County Limerick, Ireland
- HMS Doon, three ships of the British Royal Navy

== See also ==
- Doone, a surname
- Dun (disambiguation)
- Dune (disambiguation)
- Dhoon, a 1953 Indian film
