= List of shipwrecks in October 1849 =

The list of shipwrecks in October 1849 includes ships sunk, foundered, wrecked, grounded, or otherwise lost during October 1849.

== 1 October ==
List of shipwrecks: 1 October 1849
Ship	State	Description
Amelia	United Kingdom	The barque was lost off Cape St. Thomas. She was on a voyage from Glasgow, Renfrewshire to Rio de Janeiro, Brazil.
Bruce	United Kingdom	The ship ran aground and was damaged on the Shipwash Sand, in the North Sea off the cost of Essex. She was on a voyage from Chatham, Kent to North Shields, County Durham. She was refloated.
Commerce	Norway	The barque was wrecked on the Sunk Sand, in the North Sea off the coast of Essex. All 37 people on board were rescued. She was on a voyage from Norway to Havre de Grâce, Seine-Inférieure, France.
David	United Kingdom	The ship ran aground at the mouth of the River Boyne. She was on a voyage from Galați, Ottoman Empire to Drogheda, County Louth. She was refloated and towed in to Drogheda.
Fortitude	United Kingdom	The ship was driven ashore and severely damaged at Redcar, Yorkshire. Her crew were rescued.
Fortuna	United Kingdom	The ship ran aground on the Leman Sand, in the North Sea off the coast of Norfolk. She was on a voyage from Danzig to London. She was refloated and taken in to Great Yarmouth, Norfolk in a waterlogged condition.
Gem	United Kingdom	The brig ran aground in the Sound of Islay and was damaged. She was on a voyage from Saint Petersburg, Russia to Liverpool, Lancashire. She was refloated and found to be leaky.
Malta	United Kingdom	The ship was driven ashore near Hartlepool, County Durham. She was refloated on 14 November and towed in to South Shields, County Durham.
Margaret and Emily	United Kingdom	The brig was wrecked on the Sunk Sand. Her crew were rescued.
Maria	France	The ship was lost near Cape St. Thomas. She was on a voyage from Havre de Grâce, Seine-Inférieure to Rio de Janeiro.
St. Patrick	United Kingdom	The ship was wrecked in Rocky Bay. She was on a voyage from Labrador to Halifax, Nova Scotia, British North America.
Stranger	(United Kingdom of Great Britain and Ireland) British North America	The schooner wrecked at Gaspé, Quebec. Her crew were rescued.
Tyne	United Kingdom	The ship struck an anchor and sank at Whitby. She was refloated the next day.

== 2 October ==
List of shipwrecks: 2 October 1849
Ship	State	Description
Eagle	United Kingdom	The ship was driven ashore and wrecked on Hogland, Russia. She was on a voyage from Hartlepool, County Durham to Kronstadt, Russia.
Good Intent	(United Kingdom of Great Britain and Ireland) British North America	The brig was abandoned in the Atlantic Ocean. Her crew were rescued.
John	Sweden	The ship was driven ashore on Skagen, Denmark. She was on a voyage from Gothenburg to Newcastle upon Tyne, Northumberland, United Kingdom. She was refloated on 7 October and towed in to Gothenburg.
Joseph Colbin	United Kingdom	The ship struck the pier, was driven ashore and sank at Whitby, Yorkshire. Her crew were rescued.
Joseph Collins	United Kingdom	The ship was driven ashore at Whitby. She was refloated.
Pink	United Kingdom	The ship ran aground on the Blackstone Rock, off the coast of Deven. She was refloated.

== 3 October ==
List of shipwrecks: 3 October 1849
Ship	State	Description
Ant	United Kingdom	The aloop was driven out to sea crewless from Aberdyfi, Caernarfonshire. She subsequently came ashore 3 nautical miles (5.6 km) north of Aberdyfi.
Betsey	United Kingdom	The ship was wrecked at Trouphead, Aberdeenshire. Her crew were rescued.
Dewdrop	United Kingdom	The ship ran aground on the Little Middle Ground, in the Kattegat. She was on a voyage from Hartlepool, County Durham to Kronstadt, Russia. She was refloated and put in to Helsingør, Denmark for extra hands, being leaky.
Prospect	United Kingdom	The ship was driven ashore at Crookhaven, County Cork. She was on a voyage from Prince Edward Island, British North America to Liverpool, Lancashire. She was refloated and taken in to Crookhaven.
St. Branock	United Kingdom	The schooner ran aground on the Spit of the North Tail, in the Bristol Channel. She was on a voyage from a Welsh port to Bideford, Devon.

== 4 October ==
List of shipwrecks: 4 October 1849
Ship	State	Description
Betsey	United Kingdom	The ship was wrecked on the North Shoals, in the Bristol Channel off the coast of Devon. She was on a voyage from Newport, Monmouthshire to Plymouth, Devon.
Gleaner	(United Kingdom of Great Britain and Ireland) Guernsey	The ship was driven ashore west of "Dragoe", Denmark. She was on a voyage from Málaga, Spain to Saint Petersburg, Russia. She was refloated and resumed her voyage.
Guardian	United Kingdom	The ship ran aground and capsized in the River Tyne at Walker Spout, Northumberland. She was refloated and taken in to Hebburn.
Jeune Nelly	France	The ship ran aground at Pernambuco, Brazil and was damaged. She was refloated but found to be leaky.
Memnon	United Kingdom	The brig ran aground at South Shields, County Durham. she was on a voyage from London to South Shields. She was refloated and taken in to South Shields.
Rockingham	United States	The full-rigged ship struck the Pearl Rock and was consequently beached at Tarifa, Spain.

== 5 October ==
List of shipwrecks: 5 October 1849
Ship	State	Description
Advice	United Kingdom	The ship ran aground and sank at Low Hauxley, Northumberland. Her crew were rescued. She was on a voyage from Charlestown, Cornwall to Selby, Yorkshire.
Constancia	Spain	The ship was wrecked on the Isla de Juventud, Cuba. Her crew were rescued. She was on a voyage from Cienfuegos, Cuba to Málaga.
Frau Alida	Bremen	The ship was driven ashore between "Soltholm" and Misselwarden.
Junius	United Kingdom	The ship was driven ashore on "Blackstoun Island", County Antrim.
Livonia	Bremen	The barque was driven ashore at Ottendorf, Duchy of Schleswig. She was on a voyage from Bremen to New South Wales.
Speedwell	(United Kingdom of Great Britain and Ireland) Jersey	The ship was run down and sunk by a French brig off the Galloper Sand, in the North Sea off the coast of Suffolk. Her crew were rescued.

== 6 October ==
List of shipwrecks: 6 October 1849
Ship	State	Description
Fear Not	Flag unknown	The brig, either a British or Prussian vessel, was lost at Tobasco with the loss of all hands on board. Her captain, being ashore, survived.
Fleece	United Kingdom	The brig ran aground on the Gunfleet Sand, in the North Sea off the coast of Essex. She was refloated with the assistance of the smacks Agenoria, Aurora's Increase, Success, Trial (all United Kingdom) and HMRC Scout ( Board of Customs) and was beached at Walton-on-the-Naze, Essex where she was pillaged. Fleece was on a voyage from Saint Petersburg, Russia to London.
Grace	United Kingdom	The ship ran aground on the Gunfleet Sand. She was refloated but found to be leaky and was abandoned. Her crew were rescued by Shepherd (United Kingdom). Grace was on a voyage from London to Leith, Lothian.
Mario	Prussia	The ship ran aground on the Stilsand, in the North Sea. She was on a voyage from Königsberg to Hamburg.
Richard Cobden	United States	The ship was driven ashore at Holmes Hole, Massachusetts. She was on a voyage from Londonderry, Nova Scotia, British North America to New York. She was refloated.
Rockingham	United States	The ship struck the Pearl Rocks, in the Mediterranean Sea. she was consequently beached near Tarifa, Spain. She was on a voyage from Palermo, Sicily to an American port. Rockingham was consequently condemned.
Tiberius	(United Kingdom of Great Britain and Ireland) British North America	The ship capsized off Whitehead, Nova Scotia. Her crew were rescued. She was on a voyage from Saint John's, Newfoundland to Sydney, Nova Scotia. Tiberius was subsequently towed in to Halifax, Nova Scotia by the schooner Trusty ( (United Kingdom of Great Britain and Ireland) British North America.
Unity	United Kingdom	The ship was driven ashore at Glasgow, Province of Canada, British North America. She was on a voyage from Labrador to Halifax, Nova Scotia. Unity was later refloated.

== 7 October ==
List of shipwrecks: 7 October 1849
Ship	State	Description
Active	United Kingdom	The ship was driven ashore 4 nautical miles (7.4 km) south of Bridlington, Yorkshire. She was on a voyage from Peterhead, Aberdeenshire to Hull, Yorkshire. She was refloated on 17 October and found to be severely damaged.
Active	United Kingdom	The schooner was driven ashore at Salem, Massachusetts, United States. She had been refloated by 17 October.
Albion	United Kingdom	The schooner ran aground on the Trinity Sand, in the North Sea and sank. Her crew were rescued.
Amitie, or Emilie	France	The schooner was wrecked on the Herd Sand, in the North Sea off the coast of County Durham, United Kingdom with the loss of two of her crew. Survivors were rescued by the South Shields Lifeboat. She was on a voyage from Blyth, Northumberland, United Kingdom to Cette, Hérault.
Blackett and Ridley	United Kingdom	The ship was driven ashore at Bridlington. Her crew were rescued. by the Bridlington Lifeboat. She was on a voyage from London to South Shields, County Durham. Blackett and Ridley was refloated on 16 October.
Celestine	France	The schooner was driven ashore and wrecked at Bridlington. She was on a voyage from Blyth to Caen, Calvados. She was refloated on 18 October. The wreck was sold.
Eleanor Jane	(United Kingdom of Great Britain and Ireland) British North America	The ship was driven ashore near Duxbury, Massachusetts, United States. She was on a voyage from Provincetown, Massachusetts to Saint John, New Brunswick.
Flying Fish	United Kingdom	The brig was lost on a voyage from the Nicobar Islands to Penang, Malaya. Her crew were rescued.
Friends	United Kingdom	The ship was driven ashore and wrecked south of Bridlington. She was on a voyage from South Shields to Whitstable, Kent.
Friendship	(United Kingdom of Great Britain and Ireland) British North America	The schooner was driven ashore and wrecked at Kingstown, County Dublin. She was on a voyage from Halifax, Nova Scotia to Liverpool, Lancashire.
Friendship	United Kingdom	The sloop was driven ashore and wrecked at North Somercotes, Lincolnshire. She was on a voyage from Colchester, Essex to Leeds, Yorkshire.
Gabrielle	France	The ship was in collision with a chasse-marée and was driven ashore and severely damaged at Abrevach, Finistère. She was on a voyage from Morlaix, Finistère to Toulon, Var.
Geertruida Alida	Netherlands	The ship was driven ashore on Baltrum, Kingdom of Hanover. Her crew were rescued. She was on a voyage from Hartlepool, County Durham to Brake, Kingdom of Hanover.
Graces	United Kingdom	The ship was driven ashore 4 nautical miles (7.4 km) south of Bridlington. She was on a voyage from London to South Shields. She was refloated on 17 October and found to be severely damaged.
Helen	United Kingdom	The ship was driven ashore at Wicklow. She was on a voyage from New Ross, County Wexford to Preston, Lancashire. She was later refloated.
Hylton Castle	United Kingdom	The ship was driven ashore between Bridlington and Spurn Point, Yorkshire. She was refloated on 1 November and towed in to Hull, Yorkshire.
Hope	United Kingdom	The ship was driven ashore at Porthor, Caernarfonshire.
Industry	United Kingdom	The ship was driven ashore 4 nautical miles (7.4 km) south of Bridlington. She was on a voyage from London to South Shields. She was refloated on 17 October and taken in to Bridlington, but struck the pier and was further damaged.
Kathleen	(United Kingdom of Great Britain and Ireland)	The ship was driven ashore in Boston Bay. She was on a voyage from Pictou, Nova Scotia to Boston, Massachusetts, United States.
Kitty	United Kingdom	The schooner was driven ashore and wrecked at North Somercotes. She was on a voyage from Stockton-on-Tees, County Durham to London.
Leo	United Kingdom	The ship was driven ashore near Dimlington, Yorkshire. She was refloated on 17 October and towed in to Hull, Yorkshire.
Lively	United Kingdom	The ship was driven ashore and wrecked at Bridlington. Her crew were rescued by the Bridlington Lifeboat.
Margaret Campbell	United Kingdom	The ship was beached at Harwich, Essex. She was on a voyage from London to Newburgh, Fife.
Mary	United Kingdom	The ship was driven ashore and wrecked north of Bridlington. Her crew were rescued by the Bridlington Lifeboat. She was on a voyage from South Shields to London.
Meg Mirrilees	(United Kingdom of Great Britain and Ireland) Isle of Man	The smack foundered in the Irish Sea. Her crew were rescued by India (United Kingdom). Meg Mirrilees was on a voyage from Douglas to Liverpool.
Neptune	United Kingdom	The ship was driven ashore south of Bridlington. She was on a voyage from Boston, Lincolnshire to Stockton-on-Tees, County Durham. She was refloated on 15 October.
Oregon	United States	The ship was driven ashore near Beaumaris, Anglesey, United Kingdom. She was on a voyage from Quebec City, Province of Canada, British North America to Liverpool. She was refloated on 10 October and completed her voyage.
Paragon	United Kingdom	The fishing smack was driven ashore and wrecked at Black Ball, Devon.
Sisters	United Kingdom	The ship was driven ashore south of Ramsey, Isle of Man.
St. John	United Kingdom	During a voyage carrying Irish immigrants from Galway, Ireland, to Boston, Massachusetts, the brig dragged her anchor during a storm and was wrecked on Grampus Ledge (also known as The Grampuses), a reef off Cohasset, Massachusetts, with the loss of 99 lives. At least 21, and perhaps as many as 130 people, were rescued. Her wreck settled in up to 20 feet (6.1 m) of water at 42°15′57″N 070°46′48″W.
Teresa	United Kingdom	The ship was driven ashore between Bridlington and Spurn Point.
Unity	United Kingdom	The sloop foundered in the North Sea 20 nautical miles (37 km) off Dimlington, Yorkshire. Her crew were rescued.
Wissacumoon	United States	The full-rigged ship was driven ashore at Beachy Head, Sussex, United Kingdom. She was on a voyage from Saint Petersburg, Russia to Rio de Janeiro, Brazil. She was refloated and put in to Portsmouth, Hampshire, United Kingdom in a leaky condition.
Woodfield	United Kingdom	The ship was driven ashore at Hartlepool, County Durham. Her rew were rescued.

== 8 October ==
List of shipwrecks: 8 October 1849
Ship	State	Description
Aaron Hart, Falcon, Illinois, Marshall Ney and North America	United States	Falcon caught fire at New Orleans, Louisiana. The fire spread to the other vessels and quayside buildings. Three of the five vessels sank.
Amelia	United Kingdom	The brig was driven ashore at Grimsby, Lincolnshire She was on a voyage from London to Hartlepool, County Durham.
Christina Murray	United Kingdom	The ship was driven ashore on Møn, Denmark. She was on a voyage from London to Stettin. She was refloated on 17 October and towed in to Copenhagen, Denmark.
Competitor	United Kingdom	The ship sprang a leak and was beached 3 nautical miles (5.6 km) east of Dunbar, Lothian. Her crew were rescued. She was on a voyage from Hartlepool to Kronstadt, Russia.
Eemstroom	Netherlands	The steamship sank at Delfzijl, Groningen. She was on a voyage from Emden, Kingdom of Hanover to Delfzijl.
Endeavour	United Kingdom	The sloop was driven ashore at Sheringham, Norfolk. Her crew were rescued.
Etta Marie	Hamburg	The galiot ran aground at Sunderland, County Durham, United Kingdom.
Frances	United Kingdom	The ship ran aground in the River Dee. She was on a voyage from Quebec City, Province of Canada, British North America to Chester, Cheshire.
Frederika	Kingdom of Hanover	The ship ran aground and sank off Møn. Her crew were rescued. She was on a voyage from Pillau, Prussia to Hull, Yorkshire, United Kingdom.
Hunter	United Kingdom	The brig was driven ashore at Cleethorpes, Lincolnshire.
Jantina	Netherlands	The ship was driven ashore on Callantsoog, Groningen. She was on a voyage from Newcastle upon Tyne, Northumberland, United Kingdom to a Dutch port.
Johann Alfred	Sweden	The ship ran aground off Møn. Her crew were rescued. She was on a voyage from Stralsund to Ystad.
Moore	United Kingdom	The ship was driven ashore on Heligoland and was abandoned. She was on a voyage from Sunderland to "the Crantz". She was refloated the next day.
Père Jollet	France	The brig was driven ashore and wrecked at Ness Point, Suffolk, United Kingdom with the loss of her captain.
Ringdove	United Kingdom	The ship was wrecked at Hartlepool. Her crew were rescued by the Hartlepool Lifeboat.
Ruby, and Stanton	United Kingdom	The brigs were in collision in the North Sea off the Bull Sand Lightship ( Trinity House). Both vessels were severely damaged. Stanton subsequently put in to Hull in a wrecked condition.
Shetland	United Kingdom	The ship was driven ashore at Grimsby.
Sleepless	United Kingdom	The brig was abandoned in the Atlantic Ocean. Her crew were rescued by 29th May (United Kingdom). She was on a voyage from Quebec City to Sunderland.
Susanna	United Kingdom	The schooner was driven ashore and damaged on the coast of Northumberland.
Twende Brodre	Norway	The ship was driven ashore near "Korshagen". Her crew were rescued. She was on a voyage from Christiansand to the Ise Fjord.
Vanguard	United Kingdom	The schooner was driven ashore at Sunderland.
Vesta	Grand Duchy of Mecklenburg-Schwerin	The ship ran aground off Bolderāja, Russia. She was refloated the next day.
Vrouw Jantje	Hamburg	The ship was driven ashore on Terschelling, Friesland, Netherlands. Her crew were rescued. She was on a voyage from Saint Davids, Pembrokeshire, United Kingdom to Hamburg.

== 9 October ==
List of shipwrecks: 9 October 1849
Ship	State	Description
Alixa	Kingdom of Hanover	The ship ran aground on the Neubrack. She was on a voyage from Hornmersiel to an English port.
Canarienvogel	Lübeck	The ship was driven ashore at Boltenhagen, Grand Duchy of Mecklenburg-Schwerin. She was on a voyage from Reval, Russia to Travemünde. She was refloated and taken in to Travemünde.
Georgiana	United Kingdom	The ship was driven ashore and damaged on the Darß, Prussia with the loss of her captain. She was on a voyage from Königsberg, Prussia to Hartlepool, County Durham. She was refloated on 4 November and taken in to Stralsund.
Henry Taylor	United Kingdom	The brig ran aground on the Goodwin Sands, Kent. She was on a voyage from Newcastle upon Tyne, Northumberland to Havre de Grâce, Seine-Inférieure, France. She was refloated and resumed her voyage.
Juliana	Prussia	The ship was driven ashore on the Darß. She was on a voyage from Königsberg to Hull, Yorkshire, United Kingdom. She was refloated on 4 November and taken in to Stralsund.
Ostfrisia	(Denmark) Duchy of Schleswig	The ship was wrecked off Rottumeroog, Groningen, Netherlands. She was on a voyage from Newcastle upon Tyne to Rendsburg.
Prince Regent	United Kingdom	The ship ran aground at Teignmouth, Devon. She was on a voyage from Newcastle upon Tyne, Northumberland to Teignmouth. She was refloated and beached.
Providentia	United Kingdom	The ship sank off the Dudgeon Sandbank, in the North Sea. Her crew were rescued by Rhine (United Kingdom).

== 10 October ==
List of shipwrecks: 10 October 1849
Ship	State	Description
Aegir	Sweden	The ship was driven ashore on the east coast of Öland. She was on a voyage from Stockholm to Stettin.
Columbia	United Kingdom	The ship was driven ashore at Ballyferris Point, County Antrim. She was on a voyage from Ardrossan, Ayrshire to Boston, Massachusetts, United States. She was refloated.
Jonge Derk	Netherlands	The ship was wrecked in the Vlie. She was on a voyage from Harlingen, Friesland to a port in Norway.
Sans Souchi	France	The ship departed from Pondicherry, India for Réunion. No further trace, presumed foundered with the loss of all hands.
Sarah	United Kingdom	The schooner ran aground on the Barber Sand, in the North Sea off the coast of Norfolk. She was refloated and resumed her voyage.
Simpson	United Kingdom	The ship foundered in the Irish Sea 18 nautical miles (33 km; 21 mi) off the Baily Lighthouse, County Dublin. Her crew were rescued. She was on a voyage from Troon, Ayrshire to Marseille, Bouches-du-Rhône, France.
Wilhelmine	Hamburg	The ship was driven ashore on Juist, Kingdom of Hanover. She was on a voyage from Clackmannan, United Kingdom to Hamburg. She was refloated on 17 October and taken in to Norden, Kingdom of Hanover.
Zwey Gebruder	Kingdom of Hanover	The ship was driven ashore on Juist. She was on a voyage from Newcastle upon Tyne, Northumberland, United Kingdom to Norden. She was refloated on 17 October and taken in to Norden.

== 11 October ==
List of shipwrecks: 11 October 1849
Ship	State	Description
Æolus	Kingdom of Hanover	The ship sprang a leak and was beached between Neuharlingersiel and Spiekeroog. She was on a voyage from Hornmersiel to Hull, Yorkshire, United Kingdom. She was refloated on 24 October and taken in to Carolinensiel.
Dundalk	United Kingdom	The ship ran aground and was damaged on the North Bull, in the Irish Sea off the coast of County Dublin. She was on a voyage from Troon, Ayrshire to Dundalk, County Louth. She was refloated and completed her voyage.
Eldon	United Kingdom	The barque was driven ashore at Kamouraska, Province of Canada, British North America. She was on a voyage from Quebec City, Province of canada to Cardiff, Glamorgan. She was refloated on 2 November and put back to Quebec City.
Elizabeth and Margaret	United Kingdom	The ship was driven ashore at Punta Entinas, Spain. She was on a voyage from Almería, Spain to Newfoundland, British North America.
Enterprise	United Kingdom	The ship was driven ashore at Degerhamn, Sweden. She was on a voyage from Matanzas, Cuba to Saint Petersburg, Russia. She was refloated and put in to Kalmar.
Ingeborg	Denmark	The yacht was driven ashore on Heligoland, Her crew were rescued. She was on a voyage from Ribe to Hamburg.
Ranger	United Kingdom	The ship was caught fire and was scuttled at Plymouth, Devon. She was on a voyage from Whitstable, Kent to São Miguel Island, Azores. She was refloated on 17 October.
Theresa	France	The ship was wrecked at Jérémie, Haiti. Her crew were rescued. She was on a voyage from Saint Thomas, Virgin Islands to Jérémie.
Trois Frères	France	The ship was lost at Punta Arenas, Chile.
Visitor	(United Kingdom of Great Britain and Ireland) British North America	The ship was abandoned in Lough Swilly by all but her captain. She was subsequently taken in two and beached at Rathmullen, County Donegal.

== 12 October ==
List of shipwrecks: 12 October 1849
Ship	State	Description
Columbus	United Kingdom	The ship ran aground on the Swinebottoms, in the Baltic Sea off the coast of Denmark. She was on a voyage from Leith, Lothian to Saint Petersburg, Russia. She was refloated.
Elisa	United Kingdom	The ship was driven ashore at Castel Volturno, Kingdom of the Two Sicilies. Her crew were rescued. She was on a voyage from the Clyde to Naples, Kingdom of the Two Sicilies.
Elsa	Norway	The ship was driven ashore and severely damaged at Wainfleet, Lincolnshire, United Kingdom. She was on a voyage from Bergen to Barcelona, Spain. She was refloated on 31 October and towed in to Grimsby, Lincolnshire.
Isabella	United Kingdom	The ship was wrecked on the Scharhorn Reef.
Luise	Hamburg	The ship ran aground on the Shipwash Sand, in the North Sea off the coast of Essex, United Kingdom. She was on a voyage from Hamburg to Vigo, Spain. She was refloated and taken in to Harwich, Essex.
Opzeeman's Hoop	Netherlands	The skûtsje capsized in the North Sea off Great Yarmouth, Norfolk, United Kingdom with the loss of six of her eight crew. She came ashore the next day at Southwold, Suffolk, United Kingdom.
Rita	Flag unknown	The ship was driven ashore at Wainfleet, Lincolnshire. She was on a voyage from Bergen, Norway to Barcelona, Spain.
Sarah	United Kingdom	The ship was wrecked at the mouth of the River Thames. Her crew were rescued. She was on a voyage from Stettin to London.
Selina	United Kingdom	The barque was wrecked on Islay, Inner Hebrides.

== 13 October ==
List of shipwrecks: 13 October 1849
Ship	State	Description
Nancy	United Kingdom	The ship was driven ashore south of Mizen Head, County Cork. She was refloated on 20 October and taken in to Arklow, County Wicklow.
Orpheus	United Kingdom	The barque was driven ashore at Cochin, India. She had become a wreck by 24 October.
Vesta	United Kingdom	The ship was driven ashore on Langeoog, Kingdom of Hanover. Her crew were rescued. SHe was on a voyage from Hartlepool, County Durham to Rendsburg, Kingdom of Hanover.

== 14 October ==
List of shipwrecks: 14 October 1849
Ship	State	Description
Florio	(United Kingdom of Great Britain and Ireland) British North America	The ship was abandoned in the Atlantic Ocean. Her crew were rescued by Cabot (United Kingdom) Florio was on a voyage from Halifax, Nova Scotia to Barbados.
Josephine	France	The ship struck a rock and sank off the "Island of May". Her crew were rescued. She was on a voyage from "Kircabelic" to Nantes, Loire-Inférieure.
Mathilde	United Kingdom	The ship was damaged by fire at Helsingør, Denmark.
Salisbury	United Kingdom	The schooner capsized off Low Duck Island, New Brunswick, British North America.

== 15 October ==
List of shipwrecks: 15 October 1849
Ship	State	Description
Adelaide	United Kingdom	The ship was driven ashore and wrecked in Narva Bay.
Conqueror	United Kingdom	The ship was wrecked on the Gunfleet Sand, in the North Sea off the coast of Essex with the loss of all on board, sixteen to twenty people.
Cubana	United Kingdom	The ship was wrecked on Anholt, Denmark. Her crew were rescued. She was on a voyage from Stettin to London.
Falcon	United Kingdom	The barque was wrecked on the west coast of Panay, Spanish East Indies. All seventeen people on board were rescued by Bella Vascongaga (Spain). Falcon was on a voyage from Sydney, New South Wales to Manila, Spanish East Indies.
Hoyen	Sweden	The barque was wrecked on the Long Sand, in the North Sea off the coast of Essex. Her crew were rescued. She was on a voyage from Gävle to London, United Kingdom.
James and Ann	United Kingdom	The schooner ran aground on the Stony Binks, in the North Sea off the mouth of the Humber and was abandoned. Her crew were rescued by a barque. She was subsequently towed in to Hull, Yorkshire by the smack Edward and Sophia (United Kingdom).
Joseph	United Kingdom	The ship ran aground on the Dutchman's Bank, in the Irish Sea. She was on a voyage from Prince Edward Island, British North America to Liverpool, Lancashire. She was refloated the next day and resumed her voyage.
Jupiter	Stettin	The ship was driven ashore near Fanø, Denmark. Her crew were rescued. She was on a voyage from Hull to Stettin.
Mary and Margaret	United Kingdom	The ship was driven ashore and wrecked in Narva Bay.

== 16 October ==
List of shipwrecks: 16 October 1849
Ship	State	Description
Gesina	Hamburg	The ship foundered in the North Sea. Her crew were rescued by Jantina (Bremen). Gesina was on a voyage from Newcastle upon Tyne, Northumberland, United Kingdom to Hamburg.
Jeune Auguste	(flag) France	The ship ran aground at Paimbœuf, Loire-Inférieure. She was on a voyage from Nantes, Loire-Inférieure to Penzance, Cornwall, United Kingdom. She was refloated but capsized.
John Weavil	United Kingdom	The ship struck a sunken rock and was severely damaged at St. Leonard's on Sea, Sussex.
Seagull	United Kingdom	The ship was driven ashore and wrecked 10 nautical miles (19 km) south of Wexford. Her crew were rescued. She was on a voyage from Odesa to Dublin.
Tuscarora	United Kingdom	The ship was driven ashore in the Indian River, Delaware, United States. She was on a voyage from Liverpool, Lancashire to Philadelphia, Pennsylvania, United States. She was refloated on 4 March 1850 and taken in to Lewes, Delaware for repairs.
Vandalia	Rostock	The ship was driven ashore on "Gadoe Island" and wrecked. She was on a voyage from Hamburg to Ålesund, Denmark.
William McDougall	United Kingdom	The ship was driven ashore at Smyrna, Ottoman Empire. She was on a voyage from Smyrna to Liverpool, Lancashire. She was refloated and resumed her voyage.

== 17 October ==
List of shipwrecks: 17 October 1849
Ship	State	Description
Andrew White	United Kingdom	The brig sprang a leak and was abandoned in the Atlantic Ocean (49°38′N 18°10′W). Her crew were rescued by the brig Nicholson (United Kingdom). She was on a voyage from Quebec City, Province of Canada, British North America to Sunderland, County Durham.
Bearer	United States	The ship was abandoned in the Atlantic Ocean. Her crew were rescued by Larch (United Kingdom). Bearer was on a voyage from Marseille, Bouches-du-Rhône, France to New York.
Irene	United Kingdom	The ship collided with Robert (United Kingdom) in the Atlantic Oceand and was abandoned. Her crew were rescued by Robert. Irene was on a voyage from New York to Liverpool, Lancashire.
Nimrod	United Kingdom	The ship ran aground on the Foreness Rock, Margate, Kent. She was on a voyage from Gloucester to Margate. She was refloated the next day and taken in to Margate.
Pelican	United Kingdom	The ship was driven ashore at Pwllheli, Caernarfonshire. She was refloated on 28 October and taken in to Pwllheli.
Ridon	United Kingdom	The barque was driven ashore at Kamouraska, Province of Canada. She was on a voyage from Quebec City to Cardiff, Glamorgan.
Wave	United Kingdom	The ship was driven ashore near Helsingør, Denmark. She was on a voyage from Saint Petersburg, Russia to Bristol, Gloucestershire. She was refloated and put in to Helsingør.

== 18 October ==
List of shipwrecks: 18 October 1849
Ship	State	Description
Ann	United Kingdom	The ship was wrecked on the Filsand, in the Baltic Sea. She was on a voyage from Newcastle upon Tyne, Northumberland to Kronstadt, Russia.
Brilliant	United Kingdom	The ship ran aground at the mouth of the Ebro. She was on a voyage from Livorno, Grand Duchy of Tuscany to London. She was refloated and resumed her voyage.
Conservator	United Kingdom	The brig was driven ashore at "Querin", County Clare. She was on a voyage from Odesa to Limerick. She was refloated on 31 October and resumed her voyage.
Danube	United Kingdom	The ship was in collision with a schooner and sank in the Atlantic Ocean 35 nautical miles (65 km) north of the Isles of Scilly. Her crew were rescued by Reine des Anges (France). Danube was on a voyage from Danzic to Gloucester. The schooner was presumed to have also sunk.
Emulous	United Kingdom	The ship was in collision with a steamship off Flamborough Head, East Riding of Yorkshire and was consequently beached at Filey, North Riding of Yorkshire. She was on a voyage from London to Stockton-on-Tees, County Durham. Emulous was refloated on 23 October and taken in tow, heading north.
George	United Kingdom	The ship was driven ashore in Thornton Loch. She was on a voyage from Port Dundas, Renfrewshire to King's Lynn, Norfolk.
Krone	Stettin	The ship was in collision with Idalia (United Kingdom and sank in the English Channel off Dungeness, Kent. Her crew were rescued.. She was on a voyage from Liverpool, Lancashire to Stettin.
Lucy	United Kingdom	The ship ran aground and sank on the Elbow End Bank, in the River Tay. Her crew were rescued.
Nancy	France	The ship was driven ashore and wrecked at Clonakilty, County Cork, United Kingdom. She was on a voyage from Nantes, Loire-Inférieure to Cork.
New Liverpool	United Kingdom	The ship was driven ashore at Swan Point, South Australia. She was on a voyage from Port Phillip, South Australia to Moulmein, Burma.
Washington	United States	The ship was wrecked on the Reef Dike, off North Ronaldsay, Orkney Islands, United Kingdom. Her crew were rescued. She was on a voyage from Newcastle upon Tyne, Northumberland, United Kingdom to New York.

== 19 October ==
List of shipwrecks: 19 October 1849
Ship	State	Description
Baron von Stieglitz	Russia	The ship was wrecked on the Thistle Rocks, in the Baltic Sea off the coast of Sweden. She was on a voyage from Kirkcaldy, Fife, United Kingdom to Riga.
British Flag	United Kingdom	The ship was wrecked near Utlängen, Sweden. Her crew were rescued. She was on a voyage from Pillau, Prussia to an English port.
Commerce	United Kingdom	The ship was driven ashore near Southport, Lancashire. She was refloated the next day and taken in to Liverpool, Lancashire.
Italiano	Flag unknown	The ship was wrecked on the coast of "Romelie", in the Black Sea.
Margaret and Ann	United Kingdom	The sloop was discovered abandoned and damaged 10 nautical miles (19 km) east of the Isle of May. She was towed in to Dundee, Forfarshire. Her three crew had been rescued by Tweed (United Kingdom). Margaret and Ann was on a voyage from Newcastle upon Tyne, Northumberland to Arbroath, Forfarshire.
Nancy	United Kingdom	The schooner collided with the brig Alliance and foundered in the North Sea off Flamborough Head, Yorkshire. Her crew were rescued by Alliance. Nancy was on a voyage from Sunderland, County Durham to Harwich, Essex.
Opzeman	Netherlands	The schuyt capsized in the North Sea 20 nautical miles (37 km) south west of Great Yarmouth, Norfolk, United Kingdom with the loss of eleven of her twelve crew. The survivor was rescued by a fishing smack.
Rachel	United Kingdom	The ship was driven ashore on Møn, Denmark. She was on a voyage from Danzig to Whitby, Yorkshire. She was refloated but was subsequently destroyed by fire in the Bay of Køge. Her crew were rescued. She was raised on 15 November.
Risorto	Flag unknown	The ship was wrecked on the coast of "Romelie".
St. John	(United Kingdom of Great Britain and Ireland) British North America	The ship was driven ashore and damaged on North Uist, Outer Hebrides. She was on a voyage from Quebec City, Province of Canada to the Clyde. She was refloated on 23 October.
Tuscan	United Kingdom	The ship was driven ashore at Odesa. She was refloated on 21 October and towed in to Odesa.

== 20 October ==
List of shipwrecks: 20 October 1849
Ship	State	Description
Astrea	(Russian Empire) Grand Duchy of Finland	The ship was driven ashore at "Ikiveren". She was on a voyage from Oulu to Cádiz, Spain.
Chamcook	United Kingdom	The brig was wrecked in Brendhuy Bay, Isle of Lewis, Outer Hebrides. Her crew were rescued. She was on a voyage from Liverpool, Lancashire to Pillau, Prussia.
Conferenteraad Claasen	Sweden	The ship struck a sunken rock at Frederikstad, Denmark. She was on a voyage from Hernosand to London, United Kingdom.
Duilius	United Kingdom	The ship ran aground in the English Channel off New Romney, Kent. She was on a voyage from London to China. She was refloated and resumed her voyage.
George	United Kingdom	The ship was driven ashore on the west coast of Skagen, Denmark. Her crew were rescued. She was on a voyage from Great Yarmouth, Norfolk to Nyborg, Denmark.
Harlequin	United Kingdom	The ship was in collision with Burgermaster Huidekoper (Netherlands) in the River Thames and was beached at Gravesend, Kent. She was on a voyage from London to Great Yarmouth. She was refloated the next day and put back to London.
Hendon	United Kingdom	The ship was driven ashore and wrecked at Ventspils, Russia.
Ocean	United Kingdom	The ship was driven ashore and wrecked on Dursey Island, County Cork with the loss of two of her crew. She was on a voyage from Sunderland, County Durham to Quebec City, Province of Canada, British North America.
St. John	(United Kingdom of Great Britain and Ireland) British North America	The ship ran aground off North Uist, Outer Hebrides and was damaged. She was on a voyage from Saint John, New Brunswick to the Clyde.
HMS Stromboli	Royal Navy	The paddle steamer ran aground on Hamilton's Bank, in the Solent. She was refloated the next day and taken in to Spithead, Hampshire.
William	Danzig	The ship ran aground at Hartlepool, County Durham. She was on a voyage from Hartlepool to Venice, Kingdom of Lombardy–Venetia.

== 21 October ==
List of shipwrecks: 21 October 1849
Ship	State	Description
Courrier Basque	France	The ship ran aground off Amrum, Duchy of Holstein. She was on a voyage from Bordeaux, Gironde to Hamburg.
Ebenezer	Norway	The ship was driven ashore at "Rolerstangen". She was on a voyage from Bremen to Christiansand. She was refloated and resumed her voyage.
Mercur	Kingdom of Hanover	The ship sank off Falster, Denmark. Her crew were rescued. She was on a voyage from Königsberg, Prussia to Hull, Yorkshire, United Kingdom.
Victoria	United Kingdom	The brig was driven ashore in the Hudson River. She was refloated.
Wellington	United Kingdom	The ship was wrecked on "Witscar", Russia. Her crew were rescued. She was on a voyage from Liverpool, Lancashire to Narva, Russia.

== 22 October ==
List of shipwrecks: 22 October 1849
Ship	State	Description
Ianthe	United Kingdom	The barque was abandoned in the Atlantic Ocean. All 31 people on board were rescued by Canada (United Kingdom). Ianthe was on a voyage from Glasgow, Renfrewshire to Boston, Massachusetts, United States.
Mischief	United Kingdom	The ship ran aground on the Jordan Flats, in Liverpool Bay and was abandoned by her crew. She was on a voyage from Pará, Empire of Brazil to Liverpool, Lancashire. She subsequently floated off and came ashore on the coast of Lancashire. Mischief was refloated on 3 November and taken in to Liverpool.
Repeater	United Kingdom	The ship ran aground on the Long Bank, in the Irish Sea. She was on a voyage from Liverpool to Halifax, Nova Scotia, British North America. She was refloated but found to be severely leak and was beached near Wexford. Her crew were rescued. She was refloated on 1 January 1850 and taken in to Wexford.
Selina	United Kingdom	The ship was lost at Islay.

== 23 October ==
List of shipwrecks: 23 October 1849
Ship	State	Description
Ann	United Kingdom	The ship was driven ashore at "Asselon", Russia. She was on a voyage from Newcastle upon Tyne, Northumberland to Kronstadt, Russia.
Armenia	United Kingdom	The ship was wrecked on Eierland, North Holland. Her crew were rescued. She was on a voyage from Sunderland, County Durham to the Nieuwdiep.
Earl of Fife	United Kingdom	The ship was driven ashore at Calais, France. She was on a voyage from Sunderland, County Durham to Calais. She was refloated and taken in to Calais.
Elisabeth	Sweden	The ship was wrecked on the west coast of Jutland south of the entrance to the Agger Canal. She was on a voyage from Svartvik to London, United Kingdom.
Industrious	United Kingdom	The ship ran aground at Kronstadt, Russia. She was refloated.
Isabella	United Kingdom	The ship was driven ashore at the Welsh Hook, Monmouthshire. She was on a voyage from Saint John, New Brunswick, British North America to Gloucester.
Liverpool	(United Kingdom of Great Britain and Ireland) Bahamas	The schooner was wrecked in Grand Bay. She was on a voyage from Ragged Island to Nassau.
Mary Turcan	United Kingdom	The ship ran aground and was damaged off Antigua. She was refloated and put in to Saint Thomas, Virgin Islands.
Pheodo	United Kingdom	The ship ran aground on the Filsand, in the Baltic Sea. She was on a voyage from Newcastle upon Tyne, Northumberland to Saint Petersburg, Russia. She was refloated and put in to "Baltic Port" in a leaky condition.
Sarah	Stettin	The ship ran aground on the Vineta Reef, in the Baltic Sea. She was on a voyage from Sunderland to Stettin. She was refloated and put in to Swinemünde, Prussia.
Snabb	Denmark	The ship was wrecked on the north point of Gotland. Sweden. She was on a voyage from Vestervig to "Lutterhorn".

== 24 October ==
List of shipwrecks: 24 October 1849
Ship	State	Description
Fanny	United Kingdom	The ship was driven ashore in Ross Bay, County Cork. Her crew were rescued.
Gazelle	(United Kingdom of Great Britain and Ireland) British North America	The schooner was wrecked on Cape Porcupine, Newfoundland. She was on a voyage from Prince Edward Island to Saint John's, Newfoundland.
Henriette	Danzig	The barque was in collision with a British vessel and was abandoned in the Kattegat. Her crew were rescued. She was on a voyage from Liverpool, Lancashire, United Kingdom to Danzig. A British brig took her in tow for Rørvig, Denmark, where she arrived on 30 October.
Margaret Ann	United Kingdom	The ship ran aground on the Foreness Rock, Margate, Kent. She was on a voyage from South Shields, County Durham to Plymouth, Devon. She was refloated on 26 October and resumed her voyage.
Margarieta	Netherlands	The ship was driven ashore near "Gressendorf", Prussia. She was on a voyage from Elbing to an English port. She was refloated and put in to Danzig in a leaky condition, arriving on 27 October.
Native	United Kingdom	The ship ran aground at Berkeley, Gloucestershire.
Sarah and Ann	United Kingdom	The ship ran aground off Castrup, Denmark. She was on a voyage from Stettin to Sunderland, County Durham. She was later refloated and resumed her voyage.
Syren	United Kingdom	The ship ran aground on the Newcombe Sand, in the North Sea off the coast of Suffolk. She was refloated and resumed her voyage.
Victor	Sweden	The ship ran aground off Sproge, Goland. She was on a voyage from Malmö to Gävle.

== 25 October ==
List of shipwrecks: 25 October 1849
Ship	State	Description
Commerce	United Kingdom	The ship was driven ashore and wrecked at "Candestedne", Denmark. Her crew were rescued. She was on a voyage from Liverpool, Lancashire to Stettin.
Dolphin	(United Kingdom of Great Britain and Ireland) British North America	The ship was wrecked on Prince Edward Island. She was on a voyage from Prince Edward Island to London.
Europa	United Kingdom	The ship was wrecked at Livingstone Cove, Nova Scotia, British North America. Her crew were rescued. She was on a voyage from River John, Nova Scotia to Liverpool, Lancashire.
Hero	(United Kingdom of Great Britain and Ireland) British North America	The ship ran aground and was destroyed by fire at Harbour Grace, Newfoundland.
Indus	United Kingdom	The brig was driven ashore at Pictou, Nova Scotia. She was on a voyage from Richibucto, New Brunswick to Pembroke. She was refloated and resumed her voyage.
Mary Ann	United Kingdom	The Humber Keel sank off Stallingborough, Lincolnshire. Her crew were rescued. She was on a voyage from Goole, Yorkshire to Grimsby, Lincolnshire.
Sweetheart	United Kingdom	The brig was driven ashore at Pictou. She was refloated and resumed her voyage to Boston, Massachusetts.
Wilhelmine	Greifswald	The ship ran aground north of Helsingør, Denmark. She was refloated the next day.

== 26 October ==
List of shipwrecks: 26 October 1849
Ship	State	Description
Arthur	United Kingdom	The ship was driven ashore at Lance Cove, Newfoundland, British North America. She was on a voyage from Prince Edward Island, British North America to London.
Charles Chaloner	United Kingdom	The ship was driven ashore on the coast of Louisiana, United States. She was on a voyage from Liverpool, Lancashire to New Orleans, Louisiana.
Cumberland	United Kingdom	The ship foundered in the Pacific Ocean 40 nautical miles (74 km) off Santiago, Spanish East Indies with the loss of six of her 34 crew. She was on a voyage from Bali, Netherlands East Indies to Hong Kong.
Isabella	United Kingdom	The schooner was driven ashore near North Berwick, Berwickshire. She was refloated and taken in to North Berwick for repairs.
Jane Hughes	United Kingdom	The schooner ran aground on the Curran Rock. She was on a voyage from Drogheda, County Louth to Belfast, County Antrim. She was refloated on 30 October and towed in to Belfast.
Pandora	United Kingdom	The steamship foundered in the Atlantic Ocean (48°31′N 6°19′W). Her fifteen crew were rescued by the barque Asia (United Kingdom), which took them to Madeira. Pandora was on her delivery voyage under British flag from London and Falmouth, Cornwall, United Kingdom to Alexandria, for the Egyptian Government.
St. Haralambo	Russia	The ship ran aground on the Goodwin Sands, Kent, United Kingdom. She was on a voyage from Taganrog to Saint Petersburg. She was refloated on 26 October and towed in to Ramsgate, Kent.

== 27 October ==
List of shipwrecks: 27 October 1849
Ship	State	Description
Anje	Netherlands	The ship ran aground on Læsø, Denmark. She was on a voyage from Stettin to Amsterdam, North Holland. She was refloated and taken in to Fredrikshavn, Denmark in a leaky condition.
Clio	United Kingdom	The ship ran aground and was damaged at "Gross Irnen". She was on a voyage from Riga, Russia to an English port. She was refloated and taken in to Ventspils.
Eleanor	United Kingdom	The ship ran aground off the coast of County Wexford. She was on a voyage from Liverpool, Lancashire to Livorno, Grand Duchy of Tuscany. She consequentlyput in to Milford Haven, Pembrokeshire in a leaky condition.
Greyhound	United Kingdom	The ship collided with Mary ( (United Kingdom of Great Britain and Ireland) British North America) and sank in the English Channel 9 nautical miles (17 km) south west of Beachy Head, Sussex with the loss of one of her seven crew. She was on a voyage from Stockton-on-Tees, County Durham to Exeter, Devon.
Queen Victoria	United Kingdom	The ship ran aground and was damaged on the Mille Vaches Shoals, in the Saint Lawrence River. She was on a voyage from Quebec City, Province of Canada, British North America to Plymouth, Devon. She was refloated and put back to Quebec City in a waterlogged condition.

== 28 October ==
List of shipwrecks: 28 October 1849
Ship	State	Description
Adler	Stettin	The ship was wrecked on Bornholm, Denmark. She was on a voyage from Danzig to Hull, Yorkshire, United Kingdom.
Jan van Arkel II, and an unidentified aak)	Netherlands	The passengers paddle steamer of the Gorinchemsche Schiedamsche Stoomboot-maatschappij was used for the 's-Hertogenbosch—Gorinchem—Schiedam line. The boiler of the boat exploded in the harbour of Den Bosch in the Zuid-Willemsvaart killing up to 22 people. The chimney landed on an unidentified aak, which also sank.
Jane Hughes	United Kingdom	The ship struck the Carron Rock and was damaged. She was on a voyage from Drogheda, County Louth to Belfast, County Antrim. She arrived at Belfast in a leaky condition.
Jean Berta	France	The ship was abandoned in the Barents Sea. Her crew were rescued by Agnes (United Kingdom). Jean Berta was on a voyage from Arkhangelsk, Russia to Nantes, Loire-Inférieure.
Rio	United Kingdom	The ship was abandoned in the Atlantic Ocean. Her crew were rescued by Georgia (United States). Rio was on a voyage from Newcastle upon Tyne, Northumberland to New York City, United States.

== 29 October ==
List of shipwrecks: 29 October 1849
Ship	State	Description
Auriga	Russia	The ship was driven ashore near Ventava, Courland Governorate.
Cornwallis	(United Kingdom of Great Britain and Ireland) British North America	The ship was driven ashore near Nantucket, Massachusetts, United States. She was on a voyage from New York, United States to Sydney, Nova Scotia. She was refloated on 16 November and taken in to Nantucket.
Dona Maria II	Portuguese Navy	Dona Maria II. The frigate exploded and sank at Macau with the loss of 188 lives.
Edward	United Kingdom	The ship sprang a leak and was abandoned in the North Sea. Her crew were rescued. She was on a voyage from Aberdeen to London.
Fadrens Minde	Denmark	The ship was driven ashore on Eierland, North Holland, Netherlands. She was on a voyage from Fredrikstad to Harlingen, Friesland, Netherlands.
Juno	Sweden	The ship ran aground off Læsø, Denmark. Her crew were rescued. She was on a voyage from St Ubes, Portugal to Stockholm.
Libertas	(Russian Empire) Grand Duchy of Finland	The ship was wrecked on the Flyttskaw Grounds. Her crew were rescued. She was on a voyage from Vaasa to Marseille, Bouches-du-Rhône, France.

== 30 October ==
List of shipwrecks: 30 October 1849
Ship	State	Description
Ann	United Kingdom	The ship was driven ashore and wrecked on Cross Island, Massachusetts, United States. Her crew were rescued. She was on a voyage from Boston, Massachusetts to Saint Andrews, New Brunswick, British North America.
Frithjof	Hamburg	The ship ran aground on the Tegeler Sand, in the North Sea. She was on a voyage from Charleston, South Carolina to Hamburg. She was refloated and put in to Bremen.
Harriet	United Kingdom	The ship was driven ashore at Queenstown, County Cork. She was on a voyage from Constantinople, Ottoman Empire to Sligo. She was refloated and taken in to Queenstown for repairs.
Harriet Alice	United Kingdom	The schooner was in collision with a schooner off Thacher Island, Massachusetts, United States. She was abandoned the next day Harriet Alice was on a voyage from Nova Scotia, British North America to Salem, Massachusetts. She was taken in to Provincetown, Massachusetts on 30 November.
Mary and Harriet	United Kingdom	The ship was wrecked on Anticosti Island, Nova Scotia. She was on a voyage from Quebec City, Province of Canada, British North America to Cardiff, Glamorgan.
Rainbow	United Kingdom	The ship was driven ashore on the Holderness coast, Yorkshire. She was refloated on 1 November and taken in to Whitby, Yorkshire.

== 31 October ==
List of shipwrecks: 31 October 1849
Ship	State	Description
Amanda	Sweden	The ship ran aground and was wrecked on the Skarlakans Grounds, in the Baltic Sea. She was on a voyage from "Karko" to Marseille, Bouches-du-Rhône, France.
Elizabeth	Sweden	The ship was wrecked off Eckerö, Åland. Her crew were rescued.

== Unknown date ==
List of shipwrecks: Unknown date in October 1849
Ship	State	Description
Alberdina	Netherlands	The ship was wrecked on Ameland, Friesland before 10 October. Her crew were rescued. She was on a voyage from Wolgast, Prussia to Rotterdam, South Holland.
Beagle	(United Kingdom of Great Britain and Ireland) British North America	The auxiliary screw steamer sank in Lake Erie. She was on a voyage from Montreal to Hamilton, Province of Canada. She was refloated.
Betsey	Sweden	The ship was driven ashore in a capsized condition at Peniche, Portugal before 3 October.
Black Diamond	United Kingdom	The ship was driven ashore at Wicklow before 2 October. She was refloated on 6 October and resumed her voyage.
Catharine Ann	(United Kingdom of Great Britain and Ireland) New South Wales	The schooner was lost in the Cook Strait. Her crew were rescued.
Ceres	United Kingdom	The sloop ran aground on the Gunfleet Sand, in the North Sea off the coast of Essex and was abandoned on or before 6 October.
Cesario	France	The brig was wrecked before 2 October. Her crew were rescued. She was on a voyage from Havana, Cuba to a French port.
El Dorado	United Kingdom	The ship was driven ashore on Red Island. She was on a voyage from Quebec City, Province of Canada to London. She was refloated on 2 November and towed back to Quebec City.
Henriette	Flag unknown	The ship was abandoned off the coast of Norway before 29 October. She was discovered on that date by Wilhelmine (Prussia), which put a crew on board. They took her in to a Norwegian port.
Inca	France	The barque was driven ashore at Talcahuano, Chile before 1 November. She was consequently condemned.
Independent	France	The ship sprang a leak before 9 October whilst on a voyage from Cayenne, French Guiana to "Ceard". She put back to Cayenne, where she was condemned.
Jane	United Kingdom	The brig was abandoned in the Atlantic Ocean before 22 October. She was on a voyage from New York, United States to Newcastle upon Tyne, Northumberland. She was discovered 188 nautical miles (348 km) south west of Cape Clear Island, County Cork, by Regent (United Kingdom), which put three crew aboard her. She was taken in to Queenstown, County Cork, where she arrived on 30 October.
Jeannies	United Kingdom	The ship was driven ashore at the entrance to the Belfast Lough. She was refloated on 7 October.
Jeune Ernestine	France	The ship was in collision with another vessel and sank with the loss of three of her crew. She was on a voyage from Sunderland, County Durham, United Kingdom to Nantes, Loire-Inférieure.
John Meir	United Kingdom	The ship was lost on the Dutch coast before 14 October with the loss of two of her crew. She was on a voyage from Hartlepool, County Durham to Hamburg.
Julian	United Kingdom	The ship departed from the Sandwich Islands for Valparaíso, Chile. No further trace, presumed foundered in the Pacific Ocean with the loss of all hands.
Laurel	(United Kingdom of Great Britain and Ireland) British North America	The schooner was lost at St. Shott's, Newfoundland with the loss of a crew member. She was on a voyage from Sydney, Nova Scotia to Saint John's, Newfoundland.
Leda or Lydia	United States	The barque was abandoned in the Atlantic Ocean before 13 October.
Levi Woodbury	United States	The fishing schooner sank, possibly on the 6th, off Boon Island while in-shore Mackerel fishing. Lost with all 10 crew.
Maria Geertruida	Netherlands	The ship was wrecked on Ameland before 10 October. Her crew were rescued. She was on a voyage from Königsberg, Prussia to Amsterdam, North Holland.
Marsden	United Kingdom	The ship was driven ashore on Møn, Denmark before 15 October. She was on a voyage from Saint Petersburg, Russia to London. She was refloated on 19 October and taken in to Helsingør, Denmark.
Neptune	United Kingdom	The ship was driven ashore south of Bridlington, Yorkshire. She was on a voyage from Boston, Lincolnshire to Stockton-on-Tees, County Durham. She was refloated on 15 October.
Noemie	United States	The ship was in collision with Sea (United States) whilst on a voyage from Savannah, Georgia to Baltimore, Maryland before 6 October. Her crew were rescued. She was subsequently towed in to port in a derelict condition.
Perle	Hamburg	The ship was wrecked on Ameland before 10 October with the loss of her captain. She was on a voyage from Aberdour, Perthshire, United Kingdom to Hamburg.
Robert Peel	Norway	The ship was driven ashore near Copenhagen, Denmark before 17 October. She was on a voyage from Piteå, Sweden to London. She was refloated and put in to Copenhagen for repairs.
Saline	United States	The ship caught fire and was abandoned in the Atlantic Ocean before 22 October. Her crew were rescued. She was on a voyage from Boston, Massachusetts to Wilmington, North Carolina and Rio de Janeiro, Brazil.
Sarah	United Kingdom	The ship departed from the River Wear for Hamburg in early October. No further trace, presumed foundered with the loss of all hands.
Sir Charles Napier	United Kingdom	The barque was wrecked in the Mingan Islands, Province of Canada. Her crew were rescued.
Sopia	United Kingdom	The ship was driven ashore and wrecked on Bornholm, Denmark before 13 October. She was on a voyage from Pillau, Prussia to Dundee, Forfarshire.
St John	United Kingdom	The brig was wrecked off Scituate beach, Massachusetts. Six passengers, including an Irish girl estimated aged three, were lost.
Vestal	United Kingdom	The ship was abandoned in the North Sea. She came ashore at Easington, County Durham on 7 October and subsequently became a wreck.
Voyager	(United Kingdom of Great Britain and Ireland) British North America	The schooner was wrecked before 2 October. Her crew were rescued. She was on a voyage from the Turks Islands to Philadelphia, Pennsylvania, United States.
William and Mary	United Kingdom	The ship sprang a leak and foundered in the Atlantic Ocean. Her crew were rescued. She was on a voyage from Wivenhoe, Essex to Quebec City, Province of Canada.
Wonder	United Kingdom	The ship foundered in the North Sea off the coast of Norfolk before 10 October.
