= Revin (name) =

Revin is both a given name and a surname. Notable people with the name include:

- Revin John, American radio personality
- Sergei Revin (born 1966), Russian cosmonaut

== See also ==
- Devin (name)
