= Devendra =

Sanskrit epithet and masculine name

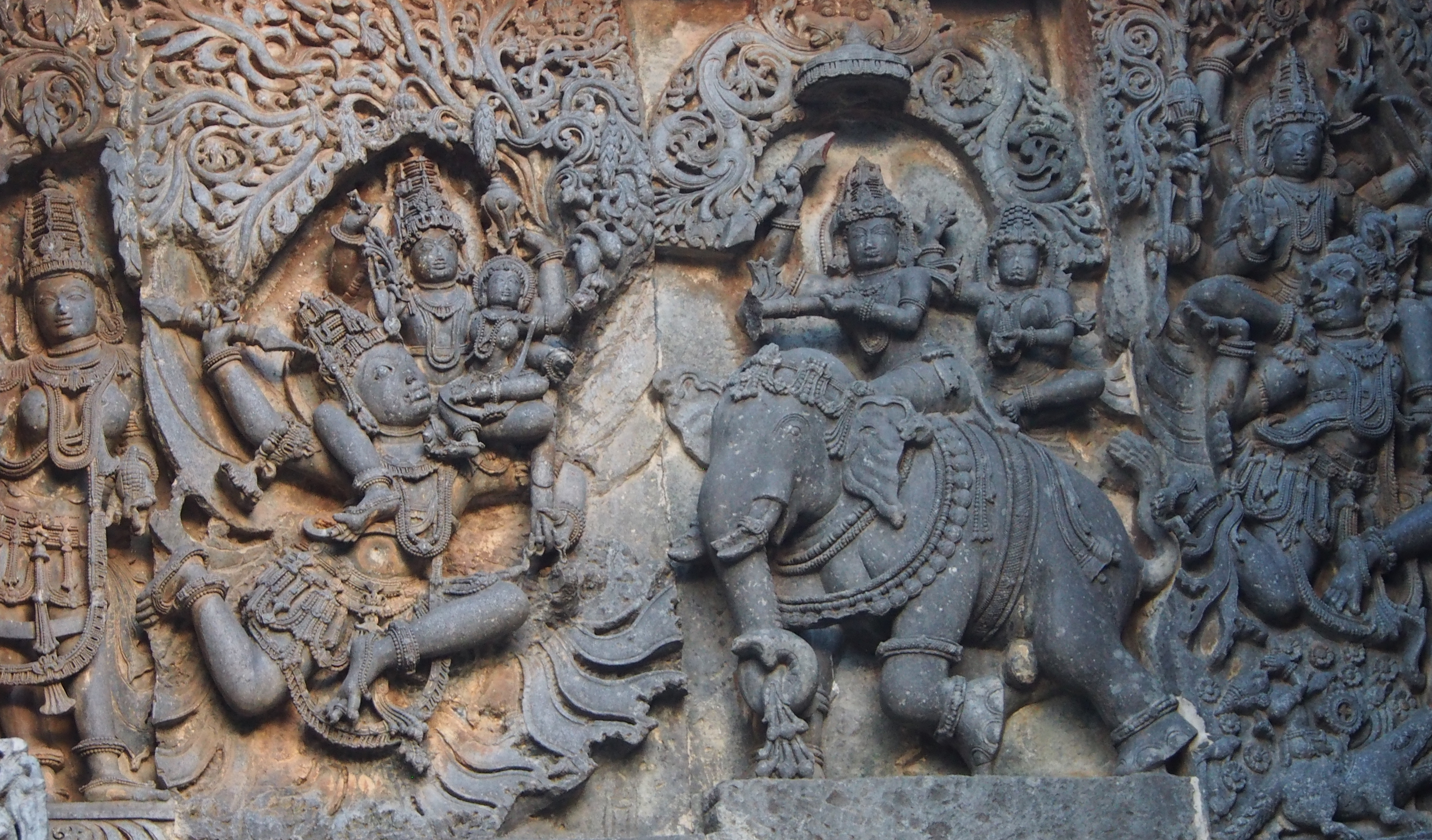
Sculpture of Indra at Hoysaleshwara Temple

Devendra (Sanskrit: देवेन्द्र, romanized: Devendra) is a common Indian masculine given name. It comes from Sanskrit devendra 'chief of the gods', which has been used as an epithet of the Vedic god Indra.

Notable people with the name include:

- Devendra Banhart, Venezuelan/American musician
- Devendra Bishoo, West Indies cricketer
- Devendra Fadnavis, Indian politician
- Devendra Goel, Indian filmmaker
- Devendra Jhajharia, Indian javelin thrower
- Devendra Kumar Joshi, the Indian Chief of Naval Staff
- Devendra Pandey, Indian politician who is best known for hijacking an airplane in 1978
- Devendra Prabhudesai, Indian biographer
- Devendra Prasad Gupta, Indian academic
- Debendra Prasad Ghosh, Indian writer
- Devendra Prasad Yadav, Indian politician
- Devendra Singh (disambiguation), multiple people
- Dev Alahan, a fictional character in ITV soap Coronation Street
