= Devon (given name) =

- Pronunciation: /ˈdɛvən/
- Gender: Unisex

Origin
- Meaning: After the English county Devon, from the surname Devon

Other names
- Related names: Devin, Devyn

The given name Devon is of uncertain origin. It may be derived from either the English county Devon, or from the surname Devon. A feminine variant of the name is Devonne.

== People ==
- Devon Alexander (born 1987), American boxer
- Devon Allen (born 1994), American athlete
- Devon Allman (born 1972), American musician
- Devon Anderson (Devon Carlo Anderson, born 1987), English actor
- Devon Aoki (Devon Edwenna Aoki, born 1982), Japanese-American supermodel and actress
- Devon Bailey (born 1991), Canadian football player
- Devon Beitzel (born 1988), American professional basketball point guard
- Devon Bostick (born 1991), Canadian actor
- Devon Briggs (born 2004), New Zealand para-cyclist
- Devon Conway (born 1991), New Zealand cricketer
- Devon Dampier (born 2004), American football player
- Devon Dotson (born 1999), American basketball player
- Devon Gearhart (born 1995), American actor
- Devon Gummersall (Devon Ryan Gummersall, born 1978), American television and film actor
- Devon Higgs (born 2000), American basketball player
- Devon Hughes (aka 'Brother Devon' and 'D-Von Dudley', born 1972), American professional wrestler
- Devon Jackson (born 2004), American football player
- Devon Kershaw (born 1982), Canadian cross-country skier
- Devon Key (born 1997), American football player
- Devon Larratt (born 1975), Canadian professional arm wrestler
- Devon Levi (born 2001), Canadian ice hockey player
- Devon Malcolm (Devon Eugene Malcolm, born 1963), English cricketer
- Devon (rapper) (Devon Martin), Canadian rapper
- Devon McDaniel, Jamaican politician
- Devon McTavish (born 1984), American soccer player
- Devon Morris (born 1961), Jamaican sprinter
- Devon Murray (Devon Michael Murray, born 1988), Irish actor who plays Seamus Finnigan in the Harry Potter movies
- Devon Nicholson (born 1982), Canadian professional wrestler
- Devon Odessa (born 1974), American actress and film producer
- Devon Price, American social psychologist and writer
- Devon (actress) (born 1977), American porn actress
- Devon Russell (died 1997), Jamaican rocksteady and reggae singer and record producer
- Devon Saal, South African professional footballer for Milano United
- Devon Sandoval, American soccer player forward for Major League Soccer Real Salt Lake
- Devon Sawa (Devon Edward Sawa, born 1978), Canadian actor
- Devon Seron (Devon May Natividad Seron, born 1993), Filipina actress
- Devon Smith (Devon Sheldon Smith, born 1981), West Indian cricketer
- Devon Soltendieck (born 1985), Canadian MuchMusic VJ
- Devon (singer) (Devon Song, born 1980), lead male vocalist in Taiwanese band Nan Quan Ma Ma
- Devon Sproule (born 1982), American musician
- Devon Storm (Chris Ford), American wrestler
- Devon Teuscher, American ballet dancer
- Devon Thomas, West Indian cricketer from Antigua
- Devon Torrence, American football cornerback and National Football League free agent
- Devon Travis, American professional baseball Toronto Blue Jays second baseman
- Devon van Oostrum, British basketball player for Laboral Kutxa of the Spanish League
- Devon Werkheiser (Devon Joseph Werkheiser, born 1991), American actor and singer
- Devon White (baseball) (Devon Markes White or "Devo", born 1962), Jamaican American baseball player
- Devon White (footballer) (born 1964), English footballer
- Devon Williams, South African rugby union player
- Devon Williamson, New Zealand playwright
- Devon Windsor, American model
- Devon Witherspoon (born 2000), American football player
- Devon Wylie, American football wide receiver for the NFL San Francisco 49ers

== Fictional characters ==
- Devon, from the Disney's Pixar film Turning Red
- Devon Daniels, one of the main characters in Power Rangers Beast Morphers
- Devon D'Marco, from the Netflix original series Project Mc²
- Devon Evans, from the USA/Syfy television series, Chucky, based on the Child's Play media franchise
- Devon Blaine Marks, protagonist of The New Kid, the third story in Five Nights at Freddy's Fazbear Frights
- Devon Miles, the head of the Foundation for Law and Government in the original Knight Rider series
- Devon Scout-Hale, from the Apple TV+ drama "Severance"
- Devon White, from the US TV series The Office
- Devon Woodcomb, from the US TV series Chuck

== See also ==
- De’Von Achane (born 2001), American football player
- Devin (name)
