= List of shipwrecks in April 1856 =

The list of shipwrecks in April 1856 includes ships sunk, foundered, grounded, or otherwise lost during April 1856.

== 1 April ==
List of shipwrecks: 1 April 1856
Ship	State	Description
Colonist	Belgium	The brig was driven ashore and wrecked at Bône, Algeria.
Heroine	United Kingdom	The barque was driven ashore and wrecked at Cádiz, Spain. She was on a voyage from Cádiz to Quebec City, Province of Canada, British North America.

== 2 April ==
List of shipwrecks: 2 April 1856
Ship	State	Description
Deux Sophie	France	The brig was driven ashore near Conil de la Frontera, Spain. Her crew were rescued. She was on a voyage from Swansea, Glamorgan, United Kingdom, to Barcelona, Spain.
Elizabeth Buckham	United Kingdom	The ship was driven ashore in Ballyconnoly Bay. Her crew were rescued. She was on a voyage from Cárdenas, Cuba, to Liverpool, Lancashire. She was refloated on 8 May and sailed for Cork.
Quayside	United Kingdom	The ship ran aground at South Shields, County Durham. She was on a voyage from South Shields to London. She was refloated and put back to South Shields in a leaky condition.
Vivid	United Kingdom	The ship ran aground on the Longsand, in the North Sea off the coast of Essex. She was on a voyage from Sunderland, County Durham, to the West Indies. She was refloated and resumed her voyage.

== 3 April ==
List of shipwrecks: 3 April 1856
Ship	State	Description
Glorias de Maria	Spain	The ship struck the pier at Dover, Kent, United Kingdom, and was severely damaged. She was on a voyage from Cuba to Bremen.
Grecian Queen	United Kingdom	The brig was damaged by fire in the Yarra Yarra River.
Happy Return	United Kingdom	The ship was driven ashore and wrecked at Wells-next-the-Sea, Norfolk. Her crew were rescued. She was on a voyage from Grangemouth, Stirlingshire, to Dunkirk, Nord, France.
Jessy	United Kingdom	The schooner struck a sunken wreck and sank in the River Tees. She was on a voyage from Middlesbrough, Yorkshire, to Exeter, Devon. She was refloated but found to be severely damaged.
Sea Queen	United Kingdom	The schooner ran aground off Alexandria, Egypt. She was on a voyage from Middlesbrough, Yorkshire, to Alexandria. She was refloated.
Vandal	United Kingdom	The ship was wrecked on the Hartwell Reef, off the Cape Verde Islands. Her crew were rescued. She was on a voyage from Liverpool, Lancashire, to Ambriz, Portuguese West Africa.
Woodcock	United Kingdom	The ship was driven ashore and wrecked at Dungeness, Kent.

== 4 April ==
List of shipwrecks: 4 April 1856
Ship	State	Description
Margaret	United Kingdom	The ship ran aground in Wigtown Bay. Her crew were rescued.

== 5 April ==
List of shipwrecks: 5 April 1856
Ship	State	Description
Deux Sophies	France	The brig was driven ashore near "Carril", Spain. She was on a voyage from Swansea, Glamorgan, United Kingdom, to Barcelona, Spain.
John	United Kingdom	The ship was driven ashore and wrecked at Broad Haven, Pembrokeshire.
New Darlington	United Kingdom	The ship ran aground on the Smithwick Sand, in the North Sea. She was on a voyage from Seaham, County Durham, to London. She was refloated and taken in to Bridlington, Yorkshire, in a leaky condition.

== 6 April ==
List of shipwrecks: 6 April 1856
Ship	State	Description
Augusta Jessie	United Kingdom	The barque was wrecked on the coast of County Donegal with the loss of one of her fourteen crew. Survivors were rescued by the Buncrana Coast Guard.
Essex	United Kingdom	The ship was driven ashore and wrecked at Sunderland, County Durham. She was on a voyage from Sunderland to Hamburg.
Harlington	United Kingdom	The ship ran aground at Sunderland. She was refloated and put back to Sunderland in a leaky condition.
Zephyr	United Kingdom	The ship ran aground on the Diamond Rock. She was on a voyage from Antigua to London. She was refloated the next day and taken in to Antigua in a severely damaged condition.

== 7 April ==
List of shipwrecks: 7 April 1856
Ship	State	Description
Essex	United Kingdom	The ship ran aground and was wrecked at Sunderland, County Durham. Her crew were rescued.
Pocohontas	United States	The ship was driven ashore on Key Vaccas, Florida. She was on a voyage from Liverpool, Lancashire, United Kingdom, to New Orleans, Louisiana. She was later refloated and completed her voyage.

== 8 April ==
List of shipwrecks: 8 April 1856
Ship	State	Description
Easdale	United Kingdom	The ship was driven ashore in the Bay of Luce. She was on a voyage from Tobermory, Isle of Mull to Liverpool, Lancashire. She was refloated and taken in to Dromore, County Down.
Reciprocity	United Kingdom	The ship was wrecked at Saint Pierre.

== 9 April ==
List of shipwrecks: 9 April 1856
Ship	State	Description
Dart Packet	United Kingdom	The ship was driven ashore at Plymouth, Devon.
Gazelle	United Kingdom	The ship was sighted off "Cape Maria" whilst bound for Newfoundland, British North America. No further trace, presumed foundered with the loss of all on board, her crew and 183 passengers.

== 10 April ==
List of shipwrecks: 10 April 1856
Ship	State	Description
Carmelina	France	The ship was wrecked in the Gulf of Palmas.
Klawetta	Prussia	The full-rigged ship was driven ashore in the Dardanelles.
Maria Engracia	Spain	The barque caught fire at Greenock, Renfrewshire, United Kingdom. Firefighting efforts with the aid of HMS Atholl (Royal Navy) were ineffective and she was scuttled to extinguish the fire. She was then refloated.
Montebello	(United Kingdom of Great Britain and Ireland) British North America	The brig was abandoned in the Atlantic Ocean. Her crew were rescued. She was on a voyage from Saint John, New Brunswick, to Norfolk, Virginia, United States.
Royal Rose	United Kingdom	The ship was wrecked at Trabzon, Ottoman Empire. Her crew were rescued.

== 11 April ==
List of shipwrecks: 11 April 1856
Ship	State	Description
Minerva	Denmark	The schooner ran aground on the Herd Sand, in the North Sea off the couast of County Durham, United Kingdom. She was refloated the next day.
Scottish Maid	United Kingdom	The ship ran aground off Quillebeuf-sur-Seine, Eure, France. She was on a voyage from Newcastle upon Tyne, Northumberland, to Rouen, Seine-Inférieure, France. She was refloated and put in to Havre de Grâce, Seine-Inférieure.

== 12 April ==
List of shipwrecks: 12 April 1856
Ship	State	Description
Sisters	(United Kingdom of Great Britain and Ireland) British North America	The ship was wrecked near Sandy Point, Nova Scotia. Her crew were rescued.
True Blue	United Kingdom	The sloop was driven ashore in the River Eden.
Veracity	United Kingdom	The brig ran aground in the Swin, off the coast of Essex. She was refloated.

== 13 April ==
List of shipwrecks: 13 April 1856
Ship	State	Description
Happy Return	United Kingdom	The ship was driven ashore and wrecked at Wells-next-the-Sea, Norfolk. She was on a voyage from Grangemouth, Stirlingshire, to Dunkirk, Nord, France.
Thomas	United Kingdom	The brig was driven ashore and wrecked at Pakefield, Suffolk. Her eleven crew were rescued by the Pakefield Lifeboat.

== 14 April ==
List of shipwrecks: 14 April 1856
Ship	State	Description
Abbey Langdon	France	The ship was driven ashore at Cape Romain, South Carolina, United States. She was on a voyage from Havre de Grâce, Seine-Inférieure, to Charleston, South Carolina. She was refloated and towed in to Charleston in a leaky condition.
Clara Maria	Danzig	The ship was wrecked on Bornholm, Denmark. Her crew were rescued. She was on a voyage from Danzig to Sunderland, County Durham. United Kingdom.
Good Intent	United Kingdom	The ship was driven ashore at the entrance to The Swale. She was on a voyage from Whitby, Yorkshire, to Faversham, Kent. She was refloated on 19 April and taken in to Faversham.
Halcyon	United Kingdom	The ship was wrecked in the Swin, off the coast of Essex. Her crew were rescued by Resolution (United Kingdom). She was on a voyage from Newcastle upon Tyne, Northumberland, to London.
Isabella	United Kingdom	The schooner ran aground off Whitstable, Kent. She was refloated on 23 April.
Odin	United Kingdom	The brig ran aground on the Barnard Sand, in the North Sea off the coast of Suffolk. She was on a voyage from Newcastle upon tyne to London. She floated off and sank off Easton Bavents, Suffolk. Her crew survived.
Wielands	United Kingdom	The ship ran aground on the Barber Sand, in the North Sea off the coast of Norfolk. She was on a voyage from Sunderland to Newhaven, Sussex. She was refloated and towed in to Great Yarmouth, Norfolk, in a severely leaky condition.

== 15 April ==
List of shipwrecks: 15 April 1856
Ship	State	Description
Australia	United Kingdom	The ship was driven ashore at Blackwall, Middlesex. She was on a voyage from Callao, Peru, to London. She was refloated.
Blanchard	United States	The barque was driven ashore and wrecked at Kingsdown, Kent, United Kingdom. All sixteen people on board were rescued. She was on a voyage from Charleston, South Carolina, to Bremen.
Courier	United Kingdom	The brigantine was wrecked on the Kentish Knock with the loss of her captain. She was on a voyage from South Shields, County Durham, United Kingdom, to Dieppe, Seine-Inférieure.
Despatch	United Kingdom	The ketch was abandoned in the English Channel 25 nautical miles (46 km) off Portland, Dorset. Her crew were rescued by the pilot boat Gosseline (France). Despatch was on a voyage from Blyth, Northumberland, to Southampton, Hampshire.
Falconer	United Kingdom	The schooner foundered in the North Sea off Happisburgh, Norfolk. Her crew were rescued by Sarah (United Kingdom). Falconer was on a voyage from Grangemouth, Stirlingshire, to Aldeburgh, Suffolk.
Glenmariner	United Kingdom	The ship was driven ashore at Blackwall. She was on a voyage from London to Port Phillip, Victoria. She was refloated.
Hope	United Kingdom	The ship was driven ashore and wrecked at Trimingham, Norfolk.
Sir Colin Campbell	United Kingdom	The ship ran aground in the Thanlwin and was wrecked. She was on a voyage from Moulmein, Burma, to Falmouth, Cornwall.

== 16 April ==
List of shipwrecks: 16 April 1856
Ship	State	Description
Alerte	France	The ship was in collision with the schooner Rambler (France) off Havre de Grâce, Seine-Inférieure. She was on a voyage from Dunkirk, Nord to Havre de Grâce. She tried to put in to Havre de Grâce but sank at the entrance to the harbour. A crew member was rescued.
Diana	Flag unknown	The schooner was driven ashore at the mouth of the River Tay. Her crew were rescued by the Dundee Lifeboat.
Fairy Queen	United Kingdom	The schooner was abandoned in the North Sea. Her crew survived. She was on a voyage from Sunderland, County Durham, to Rotterdam, South Holland, Netherlands.
Four Sisters	United Kingdom	The schooner sprang a leak in the English Channel. She was run ashore and wrecked near Dover, Kent. Her crew were rescued. Four Sisters was on a voyage from South Shields, County Durham, to Abbeville, Somme, France.
La Belle Barbarie	United Kingdom	The ship ran aground on the Kentish Knock. Her seven crew were rescued by the steamship Belgium (United Kingdom), which subsequently put some of her crew about La Belle Barbarie and tooke her in to Gravesend, Kent. La Belle Barbarie was on a voyage from Sunderland to Genoa, Kingdom of Sardinia.

== 17 April ==
List of shipwrecks: 17 April 1856
Ship	State	Description
Terpsichore	United Kingdom	The ship was wrecked on Little San Salvador Island, Bahamas.

== 18 April ==
List of shipwrecks: 18 April 1856
Ship	State	Description
Edinburgh	United Kingdom	The steamship ran aground in the Clyde at Port Glasgow, Renfrewshire. She was on a voyage from the Clyde to New York, United States. She was refloated.

== 19 April ==
List of shipwrecks: 19 April 1856
Ship	State	Description
Newcastle	United Kingdom	The ship ran aground on the Whittaker Spit, in the Thames Estuary and sank.

== 20 April ==
List of shipwrecks: 20 April 1856
Ship	State	Description
Arendina	Lübeck	The ship was driven ashore near "Hornbeck". She was on a voyage from Newcastle upon Tyne, Northumberland, United Kingdom, to Lübeck.
Choice	United Kingdom	The ship sprang a leak and foundered in the Bristol Channel off Lundy Island, Devon. Her crew survived.

== 21 April ==
List of shipwrecks: 21 April 1856
Ship	State	Description
Angantyr	United Kingdom	The ship was driven ashore and wrecked at "Steenberg", Denmark. She was on a voyage from Newcastle upon Tyne, Northumberland, to Kronstadt, Russia.
Eliza	United Kingdom	The ship was driven ashore south of Scutari, Ottoman Empire. She was on a voyage from Hull, Yorkshire, to Constantinople, Ottoman Empire. She was refloated.
Gazelle	United Kingdom	The ship was driven ashore 17 nautical miles (31 km) from Tangier, Morocco. She was on a voyage from Cardiff, Glamorgan, to Messina, Sicily. She was consequently condemned.
Herald	United Kingdom	The schooner was run ashore and wrecked at Throgg's Point, Massachusetts, United States. She was on a voyage from Halifax, Nova Scotia, British North America, to Wilmington, North Carolina, United States.
Mary	United Kingdom	The schooner capsized in the Atlantic Ocean off Gloucester, Massachusetts, United States, with the loss of all but one of her crew. She was on a voyage from Argyle, Nova Scotia, to Boston, Massachusetts.
Omar Pasha	Ottoman Empire	The steamship was driven ashore in the Bosphorus.

== 22 April ==
List of shipwrecks: 22 April 1856
Ship	State	Description
Mary and Catherine	United Kingdom	The ship was wrecked on the Bremer Rocks, on the coast of Fife. She was on a voyage from Bo'ness, Lothian, to Dunkirk, Nord. She was refloated on 5 May and taken in to St. David's, Fife, in a severely damaged condition.
Vulcan	United Kingdom	The steamship was wrecked on the Brazen Grounds, in the Baltic Sea. She was on a voyage from Stettin to Rotterdam, South Holland, Netherlands.

== 23 April ==
List of shipwrecks: 23 April 1856
Ship	State	Description
Adam Lamont	United States	The ship was driven ashore near Cárdenas, Cuba. She was on a voyage from Nassau, Bahamas, to New Orleans, Louisiana.
Axel Waldeman	Duchy of Holstein	The ship was dismasted in the North Sea and was beached 8 nautical miles (15 km) south of Peterhead, Aberdeenshire, United Kingdom. She was on a voyage from Charleston, South Carolina, United States, to Tromsø, Norway. She was later refloated and towed to Leith, Lothian, United Kingdom.
Great Conquest, and Victory	United Kingdom	The tugs ran aground in the Swilly Passage whilst towing Culloden (United Kingdom). They were refloated and resumed their voyage.
Randolph	United Kingdom	The ship foundered off the east coast of the United States. Her crew were rescued by Atlas and Port Glasgow (both United Kingdom). Randolph was on a voyage from Cárdenas, Cuba, to Glasgow.
Robert Stride	United Kingdom	The ship ran aground and was wrecked at Seaham, County Durham. She was on a voyage from Seaham to Saint Helena.

== 24 April ==
List of shipwrecks: 24 April 1856
Ship	State	Description
Belmont	United Kingdom	The paddle tug collided with Saxon (Flag unknown) and sank at Southampton, Hampshire.
City of Montreal	United Kingdom	The full-rigged ship was sighted whilst on a voyage from Liverpool, Lancashire, to Quebec City, Province of Canada, British North America. No further trace, presumed foundered with the loss of all 40 crew.
Emerald	United Kingdom	The smack was run down and sunk in the Irish Sea off Holyhead, Anglesey by Wallace (United Kingdom). Her crew were rescued. She was on a voyage from Wicklow to Liverpool.
Gypsey	(United Kingdom of Great Britain and Ireland) New South Wales	The steamship was wrecked at the mouth of the Manning river. All on board were rescued.
Jeffery	United Kingdom	The ship was run aground on the Corton Sand, in the North Sea off the coast of Suffolk.

== 25 April ==
List of shipwrecks: 25 April 1856
Ship	State	Description
Frances	United States	The ship was driven ashore on the Dry Docks Reef, off the coast of Florida. She was on a voyage from Portland, Maine, to Havana, Cuba.
John Laird	United Kingdom	The ship foundered in the Atlantic Ocean north of Lagos, Portugal, with the loss of two of her crew. She was on a voyage from Casablanca, Morocco, to Havre de Grâce, Seine-Inférieure, France.

== 26 April ==
List of shipwrecks: 26 April 1856
Ship	State	Description
Friends	United Kingdom	The ship was driven ashore and wrecked in Portowagee Bay. Her crew were rescued. She was on a voyage from Bowling, Dunbartonshire, to Belfast, County Antrim.
Helen Cook	United Kingdom	The ship caught fire in the North Sea and put in to Lindisfarne, Northumberland. She was severely damaged.
Jeannines	United Kingdom	The schooner was wrecked on the Long Rock, in the Irish Sea. She was on a voyage from Maryport, Cumberland, to Belfast, County Antrim.

== 27 April ==
List of shipwrecks: 27 April 1856
Ship	State	Description
Alma	United Kingdom	The barque ran aground on the Pickles Reef. She was on a voyage from Matanzas, Cuba, to New York, United States. She was refloated and taken in to Key West, Florida, United States.
Champion	United Kingdom	The ship was driven ashore at Lowestoft, Suffolk. She was on a voyage from London to Sunderland, County Durham.
Eugenie	France	The ship foundered in the North Sea off Whitby, Yorkshire, United Kingdom, with the loss of all but her captain. She was on a voyage from Blyth, Northumberland, United Kingdom, to Calais.
Patrick	United Kingdom	The smack struck the quayside at Dublin and was wrecked with the loss of a crew member.

== 29 April ==
List of shipwrecks: 29 April 1856
Ship	State	Description
Doctor Daniel	Hamburg	The brig was driven ashore near Hartlepool, County Durham. United Kingdom. She was refloated on 4 June and towed in to Hartlepool for repairs.
Susan King	United Kingdom	The ship sank in the North Sea between Heligoland and the mouth of the Elbe. Her crew were rescued. She was on a voyage from Sunderland, County Durham, to Harburg, Hamburg.

== 30 April ==
List of shipwrecks: 30 April 1856
Ship	State	Description
Anna	Prussia	The ship ran aground on the Droogden, in the Baltic Sea. She was on a voyage from Memel to Cardiff, Glamorgan, United Kingdom. She was refloated on 4 May and resumed her voyage.
Emma Ernestine	France	The ship was wrecked on the Antioches Rocks, off the Île d'Oléron, Charente-Inférieure. She was on a voyage from Newport, Monmouthshire, United Kingdom, to Bordeaux, Gironde.
Endocia	United Kingdom	The ship was abandoned in the Atlantic Ocean. Her crew were rescued by Empire State (United States). Endocia was on a voyage from Liverpool, Lancashire, to Saint John, New Brunswick, British North America.
Lady Aberdour	United Kingdom	The ship was driven ashore on Anholt, Denmark. She was on a voyage from Danzig to London. She was refloated on 2 May and taken in to Helsingør, Denmark, in a leaky condition.
William and Isabella	United Kingdom	The brig was driven ashore at Seaton Carew, County Durham.

== Unknown date ==
List of shipwrecks: Unknown date in April 1856
Ship	State	Description
Baron of Bramber	United Kingdom	The ship was wrecked off Menorca, Spain. She was on a voyage from Sierra Leone to Marseille, Bouches-du-Rhône, France.
Fanny	Peru	The barque was lost in the Chiloé Archipelago, Chile, with the loss of six of her crew.
Hondrine	France	The ship was wrecked in the Bay of Tripoli before 20 April. She was on a voyage from Marseille, Bouches-du-Rhône to a port in Ottoman Syria.
Hooghly	United Kingdom	The ship foundered in the English Channel off the coast of Deven on or before 13 April.
Industry	United Kingdom	The ship was in collision with another vessel in the Bristol Channel and was abandoned on or before 26 April. She was taken in to Swansea, Glamorgan, in a derelict condition on that date.
Marquis de Chinda	Brazil	The steamship was wrecked near "Goriana" before 15 April.
Montrose	United Kingdom	The barque foundered in the Atlantic Ocean. Her crew were rescued by Greyhound (United Kingdom). Montrose was on a voyage rom Glasgow, Renfrewshire, to Quebec City, Province of Canada, British North America.
Promethée	United Kingdom	The ship was wrecked at Sulina, Ottoman Empire, before 17 April.
Queen Victoria	United Kingdom	The ship was abandoned in the Atlantic Ocean on or before 2 April. She was discovered on that date and set afire. She was on a voyage from Savannah, Georgia, United States, to Bristol, Gloucestershire.
Ringdove	United Kingdom	The ship ran aground on the Frying Pan Shoals, off the coast of North Carolina, United States. She was on a voyage from Ship Island, Mississippi, United States, to Queenstown, County Cork. She was refloated and towed in to Wilmington, Delaware, United States.
Voie Lactee	France	The brig was driven ashore and wrecked at Yevpatoria, Russia, before 12 April.
