= John White-Bell =

John White Bell was an Irish Anglican priest: who was Archdeacon of Emly from 1918 until his death.

White-Bell was educated at Trinity College, Dublin and ordained in 1876.

He served at Drumcannon (Curate); and then at Cappamore (Incumbent). He was also Rural Dean of Doone from 1894 to 1918; and a Canon of Cashel from 1900 to 1918.

He died in July 1928.
