= Prabhudesai =

Prabhudesai is a surname. Notable people with the surname include:

- Devendra Prabhudesai, Indian biographer
- Nilesh Prabhudesai (born 1967), Indian cricketer
