= Devonian (disambiguation) =

Devonian is a geologic period and system of the Paleozoic Era.

Devonian may also refer to:

== Places ==
- Devonian Gardens (Calgary), an indoor near Calgary, Canada
- Devonian Way, a highway west of Edmonton, Canada
- University of Alberta Botanic Garden, formerly Devonian Botanic Garden, near Devon, Alberta, Canada

== Other uses ==
- SS Devonian, steamships with the name
- A person or something from the county of Devon in the United Kingdom
- Devonian (passenger train), a named British express train

== See also ==
- Devon (disambiguation)
