= Devin Gibson =

Devin W. Gibson
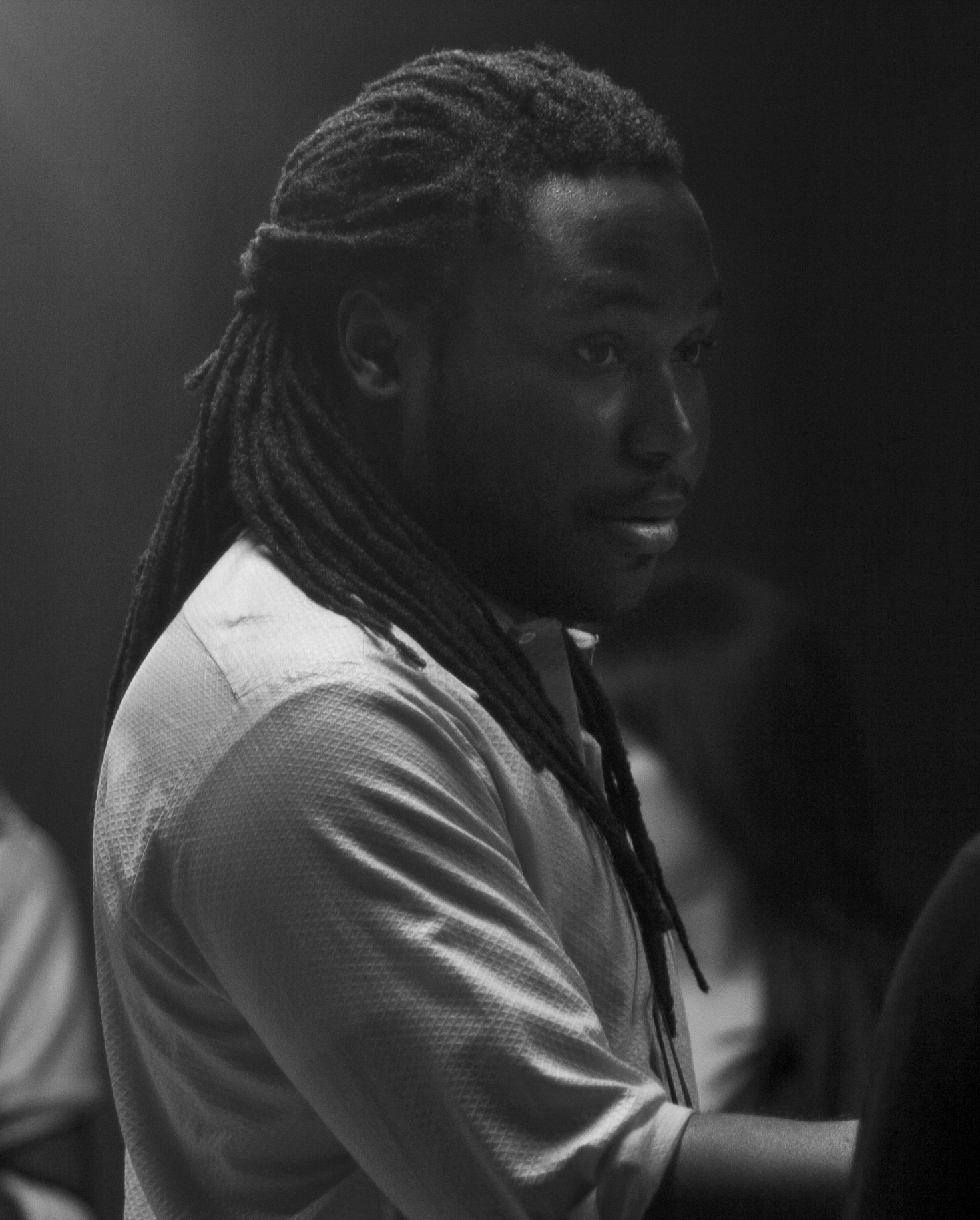
- Director Devin Gibson on the set of a music video
- Born: Devin Gibson; April 21, 1987 (age 37); Queens, New York
- Education: USC School of Cinematic Arts
- Occupation(s): music video director, author, branding adviser
- Years active: 2005–present
- Children: 1
- Website: http://www.devingibson.net/

Devin Gibson (born 21 April 1987) is an American music video director, film director, author, brand adviser, philanthropist, and president of Clarity Image Works.

== Early life ==
Devin Gibson was born in Queens, New York. He is of Liberian descent. His parents relocated to Staten Island in 1990. He attended Fiorello H. LaGuardia High School of the Performing Arts, studying music, and went on to earn a master's degree in film arts at the USC School of Cinematic Arts in Los Angeles.

== Career ==
Devin made his directorial debut in 2008 when he produced, directed, and edited a music video for Black Suit Youth called Dropout. Following the release of the video, Devin directed a second one for Black Suit Youth titled Rebel.

Gibson also works in artist brand management for Universal Music Group with the Leo Burnett Agency of Toronto and Artist & Brand Service, which has been used by Sony and for the 2014 FIFA World Cup.

In 2011 Gibson directed the AIDS awareness short It Affects Us All, which was screened in urban clinics in New York.

In January 2014, Gibson was named president of Clarity Image Works.

== Publications ==
In 2013, Gibson was to release a book geared towards helping independent artists create and manage individual brand campaigns. Publication was canceled after complaints from record labels in contract with Gibson that some of the material breached confidentiality.

On April 1, 2014, Gibson published a seven-page guidebook on music video preparation for independent recording artists and musicians entitled 5 Reasons Why A Music Video Won't Help Your Music Career. The guidebook cites personal experiences and gives advice.

== Philanthropy ==
In 2014, Progress for America presented Gibson with the United Philanthropic Achievement Award for "[his] commitment to humanitarian pursuits through foreign affairs, as well as ethical observations of social infrastructure within the United States".
