= SS Devonian =

SS Devonian may refer to the following ships:

- SS Devonian (1900), a British cargo liner torpedoed and sunk in 1917
- SS Devonian (1902), an ocean liner

== See also ==
- Devonian (disambiguation)
