= Devins =

Devins is a surname. Notable people with the surname include:

- Bianca Devins (2001–2019), American murder victim
- Jimmy Devins (born 1948), Irish politician and doctor
- Patrick Devins, fictional character

== See also ==
- Devin (name)
