= Devan =

Devan may refer to:

== People ==
- Devan (actor) (born 1952), South Indian film actor and politician
- Devan (writer) (1913–1957), Tamil writer
- Devan Bailey (born 1989), English basketball player
- Devan Boykin (born 2002), American football player
- Devan Downey (born 1987), American basketball player
- Devan Dubnyk (born 1986), Canadian ice hockey player
- Devan Ekambaram, Indian-American playback singer, actor, and composer
- Devan Nair (1923–2005), third President of Singapore
- Devan Wray (born 1979), Canadian lacrosse player and coach
- Aishwarya Devan (born 1993), Indian actress
- Bill Devan (1909–1966), Scottish footballer
- István Déván (1891–1977), Hungarian Olympic athlete and skier
- Janadas Devan (born 1954), Singaporean journalist
- K. Devan (born 1961), Malaysian footballer and manager
- M. V. Devan (1928–2014), Indian artist, critic, and orator
- Mata Sahib Devan, wife of the tenth Sikh guru, Guru Gobind Singh

== Other uses ==
- Devan (film), a 2002 Indian Tamil action film directed by Arun Pandian
- Devan v. Ernst & Young LLP, a 1998 lawsuit in Baltimore City Circuit Court

== See also ==
- Devon (disambiguation)
- Deva (disambiguation)
