= Devin Alexander =

American chef, author and media personality

- Born: Devin Alexander
- Education: Smith College and Westlake Culinary Institute
- Website: www.devinalexander.com

Devin Alexander is an American chef, author and media personality. She is the Host of Healthy Decadence on Fit TV. She has appeared on The Today Show, Good Morning America, The Biggest Loser and Access Hollywood.

== Biography ==
In 2006, she became a part of The Biggest Loser when she was brought on board to write The Biggest Loser Cookbook and demo recipes from it on the show. Since that time, she has written the other four books of The Biggest Loser Cookbook series and has appeared numerous times on the show.

Starting in 2007, she became the host of Healthy Decadence with Devin Alexander on Discovery Health and Fit TV. The show ended in 2011; however, Devin continued to share her secrets through appearances on The Today Show, Good Morning America, The Biggest Loser, Dr. Oz, Dr. Phil, The Doctors, Dr. Drew, The View, Celebrity Fit Club, Discovery Health's National Body Challenge, Fox, CNN, HGTV, USA, Style Network as well as through over 500 magazine features including Prevention, Women's Health, Men's Health and Shape.

In addition to The Biggest Loser Cookbook Series, Devin has written three additional cookbooks not aligned with The Biggest Loser brand. Her first cookbook, Fast Food Fix (Rodale, 2006) was featured as an editor's top pick in USA Today. She also wrote The Most Decadent Diet Ever! (Broadway, 2008), and I Can't Believe It's Not Fattening (Broadway, 2010).

Alexander currently serves as Culinary Advisor to Men's Fitness and has served as a Cooking Expert to Women's Health. She is on the Advisory Board of the American Culinary Federation's Chef Child Foundation and Larry King Foundation's Go-To-Chef to speak on "Obesity in America."

=== Books ===
Alexander is the author of eight cookbooks:

- Fast Food Fix (Rodale, April 18, 2006) – ISBN 978-1-59486-310-3
- The Biggest Loser Cookbook (Rodale, October 3, 2006) – ISBN 978-1-59486-575-6 (a New York Times bestseller)
- The Biggest Loser Family Cookbook (Rodale, November 11, 2008) – ISBN 978-1-60529-783-5
- The Most Decadent Diet Ever! (Broadway Books, April 22, 2008) – ISBN 978-0-7679-2881-6
- I Can’t Believe It’s Not Fattening (Broadway, March 9, 2010) – ISBN 978-0-7679-3157-1
- The Biggest Loser Dessert Cookbook (Rodale, November 9, 2010) – ISBN 978-1-60961-129-3
- The Biggest Loser Flavors of the World Cookbook (Rodale March 15, 2010) – ISBN 978-1-60961-148-4
- The Biggest Loser Quick and Easy Cookbook (Rodale, November 8, 2011) – ISBN 978-1-60961-423-2 (a New York Times bestseller)

== See also ==
- Deborah Ager
- Leslie Davenport
