= Meet Me in Death Valley =

Meet Me In Death Valley

Studio album by Black Suit Youth
- Released: August 31, 2010
- Recorded: 2009–2010 at Killingworth Studios
- Genre: Punk rock, alternative rock
- Label: All Hail Records
- Producer: Black Suit Youth, Tomas Costanza

Black Suit Youth chronology
Our Future Is History (2007)	Meet Me In Death Valley (2010)	TBA (2013)

Meet Me In Death Valley is the second studio album by Black Suit Youth. This album received rave reviews upon release. Get Stoked On Music said "Black Suit Youth have unleashed 9 songs that will instantly infect your ears and leave them aching for more." Lead single "Dropout" saw heavy rotation in college radio across the U.S.

== Track listing ==
All songs written by Black Suit Youth

1. "Rustland" 3:00
2. "Rebel" 3:32
3. "Hot Summers In Hi-Fi" 3:25
4. "Dropout" 3:31
5. "Don't Look Away" 3:34
6. "Flatline" 1:20
7. "Mosquitos" 3:11
8. "Damaged" 3:28
9. "Meet Me In Death Valley" 4:03

== Personnel ==
- All songs written and performed by Black Suit Youth
- Recorded, engineered and mixed by Anthony Santonocito
- "Dropout" produced by Tomas Costanza
- Recorded at Killingsworth Studios
