= Devens =

Devens may refer to:

== Geography ==
- Fort Devens, inactive United States Army military installation
- Federal Medical Center, Devens, federal prison in Massachusetts
- Devens, Massachusetts, regional enterprise zone and census-designated place in Massachusetts

== People ==
- Devens (name), list of people with the name
