= Devine (disambiguation) =

Devine is a surname. It may also refer to:

- Devine, Colorado, an unincorporated community
- Devine, Texas, United States, a city
  - Devine High School
- Devine, British Columbia, Canada, a rural community
- 3561 Devine, asteroid
