= Devon (disambiguation) =

Devon is a county in England.

Devon also may refer to:

== Places ==
=== Australia ===
- Devon Meadows, a town in Victoria
- Devon railway station, a former railway station in Victoria

=== Canada ===
- Devon, Alberta, a town
- Devon, Nova Scotia, a rural community in the Halifax Regional Municipality, Nova Scotia
- Devon, Ontario
- Devon Island, the second-largest of the Queen Elizabeth Islands, Nunavut
- Devon, New Brunswick, a town until 1973, then amalgamated into Fredericton

=== United Kingdom ===
- Devon (district), a unitary authority due to be formed in 2028
- Devon (European Parliament constituency)
- Devon (UK Parliament constituency)
- River Devon, Clackmannanshire, a river in Glen Devon, Scotland
- River Devon, Nottinghamshire, a river in England

=== United States ===
- Devon (Milford), a village, Connecticut
- Devon, Kansas, an unincorporated community
- Devon, Pennsylvania, a census-designated place
  - Devon station, Pennsylvania
- Devon, West Virginia, an unincorporated community
- Devon Avenue, a street in Chicago, Illinois

=== Elsewhere ===
- Devon, South Africa, a small mining town

== People ==
- Devon (given name)
- Devon (surname)

== Fiction ==
- The Devon School, a school in John Knowles' novels A Separate Peace and Peace Breaks Out
- Devon (The Office), a character in The Office, an American TV series
- Devon Hamilton, a character in The Young and the Restless

== Science and technology ==
- Devon cattle, or North Devon cattle to distinguish it from South Devon cattle
- Devonian, a geologic period
- de Havilland Devon, an aircraft

== Other uses ==
- Devon (sausage), a type of manufactured meat product sold in Australia and New Zealand
- Devon Energy, an American energy company
- Devon Tower, or Devon Energy Center, a skyscraper in Oklahoma City, Oklahoma, US
- Earl of Devon, a title

== See also ==
- Devan (disambiguation)
- Devonian (disambiguation)
