= Devin Friedman =

American journalist

Devin Friedman is an American journalist. He is a senior correspondent for GQ magazine.

== Career ==
Throughout his career he has written for Rolling Stone, The New York Times Magazine, Esquire and The New Yorker, among other periodicals. He also oversaw the photography book This is Our War.

== Books ==
In 2006, Friedman authored his first book, This is Our War.

== Awards and honors ==
Friedman was a finalist for the National Magazine Award and later won a Hopwood Award.
