= HMS Doon =

Three ships of the Royal Navy have borne the name HMS Doon:

- HMS Doon (1904) was a River-class destroyer launched in 1904 that served in World War I and was disposed of in 1919.
- HMS Doon (1917) was a trawler hired between 1917 and 1919.
- HMS Doon (1920) was a Mersey-class trawler launched in 1917 as Fraser Eaves and renamed as Doon in 1920. She was sold in 1947
