= Revin John =

Revin John is a radio personality who has been heard on KBIG-FM in Los Angeles. He was also Virgin Radio Dubai's breakfast jock but was fired after he angered listeners by impersonating God in a comedy skit about a phone call with the Almighty.

As of 31 August 2009, Revin John replaced Alex Jay (who moved to the mid morning show) on the afternoon show on the Johannesburg-based radio station 94.7 Highveld Stereo. John also hosted the popular television show "Greed".

He now is the mid day DJon Portland, Oregon's KBFF 95.5 FM.
