= Black Suit Youth =

American alternative rock band

- Origin: East Meadow, New York, USA
- Genres: Punk rock, alternative rock
- Years active: 2004–present
- Labels: 59X RECORDS; All Hail Records
- Members: Bryan Maher; Fed Canelos; Juan Orellana; Lee Nelson
- Past members: Joe Hess; Justin Damers; D.J. Meisse; Daniella Viteritti; Konstantine Sitzanis; Mike Madigan; Danny Kopij; Chris Brooks; Bryan Contreras; Eddie Christian
- Website: link

Black Suit Youth is an alternative rock band from East Meadow, New York. Formed in 2004 under the original name The New York Dynamite with original line-up of Bryan Maher (Guitar, Vocals), Joe Hess (Guitars), Mike Madigan (Bass) and Justin Damers (Drums), the band recorded their debut EP with burgeoning producer Tomas Costanza (Diffuser, Band Camp, Disney artists). In 2007 the band changed their name to Black Suit Youth and released their debut album, "Our Future Is History" which followed touring throughout 2007 and 2008. In 2008 the band replaced bassist Daniela Viteritti with bassist D.J. Meisse and released their second album on All Hail Records. The critically acclaimed Meet Me In Death Valley was released on October 10, 2010. 2010 saw the band touring and supporting Story Of The Year, Armor For Sleep and Alien Ant Farm. 2012 brought another line-up change with Danny Kopij and Bryan Contreras replacing D.J. Meisse and Justin Damers on bass and drums, respectively. In early 2013 bassist Danny Kopij resigned, replaced by Eddie Christian on January 27, 2013. After the 2014 release of Room Without a View, the band went their separate ways. In 2016, Bryan Maher began to put together a new line-up with Fed Canelos on lead guitar. In 2017, Juan Orellana joined as bassist and Robert Scott Abrams on drums. The band has completed their latest album, False South, released December 14, 2018 on 59X Records. Drummer, Lee Nelson joined the band during the summer of 2019. The World Is Almost Over was recorded during the Covid pandemic and released the summer of 2021. BSY is currently working on their next album due out in 2022/23.

== Discography ==
- American Roulette (2004) As The New York Dynamite
- Our Future Is History (2007)
- East Of Eden EP (2008)
- Meet Me In Death Valley (2010)
- Take It Or Leave It EP (2012)
- Room Without A View (2014)
- False South (2018)

• The World Is Almost Over (2021)

== Members ==
- Bryan Maher - lead vocals, rhythm guitar
- Fed Canelos - lead guitar, backing vocals
- Juan Orellana - bass, backing vocals
- Lee Nelson - drums, backing vocals

== Past members ==
- Joe Hess - guitar
- Justin Damers - drums
- Danny Kopij - bass
- D.J. Meisse - bass
- Konstantine Sitzanis - bass
- Daniela Viteritti - bass
- Mike Madigan - bass
- Chris Brooks - lead guitar
- Bryan Contreras - drums
- Eddie Christian - bass
- Courtney Hume - bass
- Ray Mazza - drums
- Robert Scott Abrams - drums
