= Leslie Davenport (psychotherapist) =

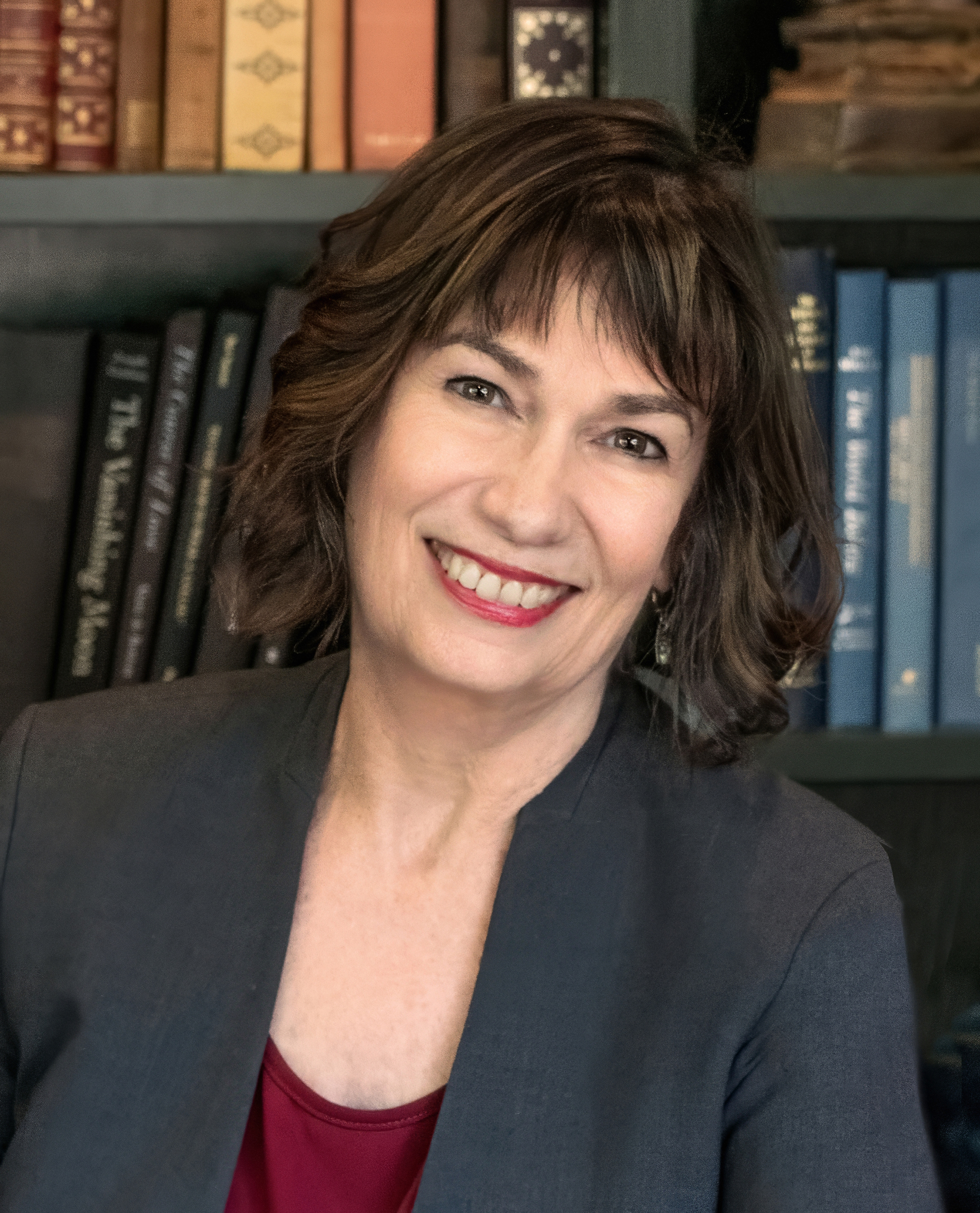
- Born: Leslie Dunn; Glendale, California, U.S.
- Education: San Francisco State University (BA); Mills College (MA); Dominican University (MS)
- Occupations: Writer; Teacher; Psychotherapist; Consultant
- Known for: Climate psychology, integrative psychotherapy
- Notable work: Emotional Resiliency in the Era of Climate Change: A Clinician’s Guide

Leslie Davenport (born Leslie Dunn) is an American writer, teacher, psychotherapist, and consultant in the mental health specialization of climate psychology. Also, she is the program and faculty lead for the Climate Psychology Certificate program at the California Institute of Integral Studies.

== Early life and education ==
Leslie Davenport was born in Glendale, California, and raised in the San Fernando Valley. Her father, originally from Northern Ireland, worked in the dairy industry, while her mother was from Appalachian Tennessee. Davenport moved to San Francisco in her early 20s to pursue modern dance. In 1976, She earned a Bachelor of Arts in Dance as a Performing Art from San Francisco State University and in 1978 completed a Master of Arts in dance from Mills College in Oakland, California. After graduation, she joined the dance faculty at Mills College. In 1990, she completed a Master of Science in Counseling Psychology from Dominican University in San Rafael, California.

== Career ==
Leslie Davenport's career began in the late 1970s when she served as a faculty member in dance at various San Francisco Bay Area institutions, including Mills College, California State University, Holy Names College, and the University of San Francisco, from 1978 to 1986.

Transitioning into psychology and integrative health, Davenport became a founding member of the Integrative Medicine Faculty and a psychotherapist at the Institute for Health & Healing/Humanities Program at California Pacific Medical Center (CPMC) and Marin General Hospital (MGH), a role she held from 1989 to 2014. Since 1992, she has also been employed as a Climate Aware Integrative Psychotherapist, working with clients in both the San Francisco Bay Area and in 2019, expanded to include Washington State.

Davenport's focus on dance evolved from performing arts to exploring the mind-body connection. She taught dance as a form of epistemological inquiry from 1983 to 1986 and again from 1992 to 1993 at the Institute of Culture and Creation Spirituality, founded by theologian Matthew Fox. In 1986, she also taught in the Department of Arts and Consciousness at John F. Kennedy University in Orinda, California.

From 1994 to 1997, she founded and supervised the Guided Imagery Program at Brookside Hospital and, from 1998 to 2005, continued this work at Alta Bates Comprehensive Cancer Center. From 1995 to 1996, she also served as a Guided Imagery Consultant for Planetree.

From 1993 to 1996, she was part of the core faculty for the Transpersonal Psychology Graduate Program at John F. Kennedy University. Later, between 2009 and 2021, she contributed as a core faculty member in curriculum development for the Certificate Program in Deep Imagination at the same institution.

=== Climate psychology practice ===
In the early 1990s, she became increasingly aware of the existential threats posed by climate change. In response to natural disasters, Davenport worked with Marin County Disaster Response Team's Psychological Support Services from 1994 to 1996, providing psychological aid to those displaced by environmental catastrophes. Between 2014 and 2017, Davenport worked on the 350.org Clean Energy Solutions Committee in Marin County, supporting local clean energy initiatives. In 2016, her environmental views were further enriched by her involvement with the Pachamama Alliance, which focuses on protecting the environment and supporting indigenous communities.

In 2008, Davenport joined the California Institute of Integral Studies (CIIS) as an off-site clinical supervisor, a role she held until 2015. From 2013 to 2023, she was an associate professor in the School of Professional Psychology and Health at CIIS. In 2022, she became the Program and Faculty Lead for the Climate Psychology Certificate Program, where she integrates climate psychology into mental health practices, a position she continues to hold.

Davenport has authored numerous works that have advanced the field of climate psychology. In 2017, she published Emotional Resiliency in the Era of Climate Change: A Clinician’s Guide with Jessica Kingsley Publishers, a foundational text for mental health professionals addressing climate-related distress. She also produced training materials with the American Psychological Association (APA), including a professional video titled Working with Clients Experiencing Climate Distress, co-created with Wendy Greenspun. For younger audiences, she authored All The Feelings Under the Sun and What to Do When Climate Change Scares You, both published by the APA's Magination Press, addressing climate-triggered psychological distress in children.

Today, Davenport remains active in clinical practice and public advocacy as a Climate Aware Integrative Psychotherapist, utilizing mindfulness, EMDR, Emotional Freedom Technique (EFT), and guided imagery to help clients foster emotional resilience and healing.

== Bibliography ==
- Davenport, L. (2024) What to Do When Climate Change Scares You. Washington DC: Magination Press.
- Staunton, T., O’Gorman, J., Hickman, C., & Anderson, J. (Eds.) (2024). Being a Therapist in a Time of Climate Breakdown. Chapter: “Transforming Our Inner and Outer Landscapes.” Oxfordshire: Routledge.
- Davenport, L., & Greenspun, W. (2022) “Working with Clients Experiencing Climate Distress.” Washington DC: American Psychological Association Psychotherapy Video Series.
- Davenport, L. (2021) All the Feelings Under the Sun. Washington DC: Magination Press.
- Erb, M., Schmid, A. (2021) Integrative Rehabilitation Practice. Chapter: “Integrative Guided Imagery.” London: Jessica Kingsley Publishers.
- Davenport, L. (2019) “A New Path: The Role of Systemic Therapists in an Era of Environmental Crisis” Family Therapy Magazine, pp. 13–16.
- Clayton, S., Manning, C. M., Krygsman, K., & Speiser, M. (2017). Reviewer of the guide “Mental Health and Our Changing Climate: Impacts, Implications, and Guidance.” American Psychological Association and ecoAmerica: Washington, D.C.
- Davenport, L. (2017) Emotional Resiliency in the Era of Climate Change: A Clinician's Guide. London: Jessica Kingsley Publishers.
- Davenport, L. (Ed.) (2016). Transformative Imagery: Cultivating the Imagination for Healing, Change, and Growth. Chapter: “Mindful Advocacy: Imagery for Engaged Wisdom.” London: Jessica Kingsley Publishers.
- A. Zajonc, P. J. Palmer, & M. Scribmer (Eds.) (2010) The Heart of Higher Education: A Call to Renewal. Essay: “Bringing Conversation into the Essence of Teaching: Making Meaningful Connections.” Hoboken: John Wiley and Sons.
- Davenport, L. (2009). Healing and Transformation Through Self-Guided imagery. Berkeley: Celestial Arts.
