= Doon International School =

Doon International School may refer to:

- Doon International School (Bhubaneswar), Odisha, India
- Doon International School, Dehradun, Uttarakhand, India
- Doon International School, Kalinganagar, Odisha, India
- Doon International School, Amritsar, a school in Punjab, India
- Doon International school, Gurdaspur, a school in Punjab, India
- Doon International School, Basirhat, West Bengal, India

== See also ==
- The Doon School, Dehradun, Uttarakhand, India
