= PS Jan van Arkel II =

Dutch ship (1847-1849)

History

Netherlands
- Name: Jan van Arkel II
- Owner: Gorinchemsche Schiedamsche Stoomboot-maatschappij
- Route: 's-Hertogenbosch—Gorinchem—Schiedam line
- Builder: Fop Smit
- Launched: 8 March 1847
- In service: early April 1847
- Out of service: 28 October 1849
- Fate: Exploded, 28 October 1849

General characteristics
- Type: Paddle steamer

PS Jan van Arkel II was a Dutch passengers paddle steamer of the Gorinchemsche Schiedamsche Stoomboot-maatschappij built by Fop Smit and launched on 8 March 1847. The ship was used for the 's-Hertogenbosch—Gorinchem—Schiedam line.

On 28 October 1849 the boiler of the boat exploded in the harbour of Den Bosch in the Zuid-Willemsvaart killing up to 22 people. The chimney landed on a Aak which also sank. The accident is regarded as one most severe steamboat accidents in the Netherlands.

== Explosion ==
In the morning of 28 October 1849, Jan van Arkel II was in the Zuid-Willemsvaart in the harbour of Den Bosch. At 7:00am, when all passengers were onboard and the boat was about to depart to Rotterdam, the boiler of the steamer exploded. The stern of the ship broke and debris was thrown into the air, and landed at various places in the city and even outside the city. The chimney landed on a Aak which also sank.

The loud bang was heard throughout the whole city and was even heard “two-hours away” at Sint-Michielsgestel (c. 10 km). The ground shaked as far away as “one-hour away” from the explosion. The explosion destroyed glass windows and doors of houses and also a facade. The PS Jan van Arkel I that was also in the harbour, was minor damaged.

== Victims and involved people ==
Ten people died immediately after the explosion and one other died later in hospital. As several people were missed, it was estimated 22 people died from the explosion. People were thrown into the air and others onboard or on the quay were hit by debris. Victims were scattered on bridges, squares and in the water. Several bodies were so mutilated that they could not be identified by family members. Eleven victims were moved to the main hospital or private houses.

Of the crew servant Hagens, hofmeester Gerritsen and officer captain Smit lost their lives. Officer Smit had just obtained the rank as captain. While Smit was described as “completely shattered”, lawyer Schiffer who was talking with Smit and standing next to him was thrown into the water and was unharmed. Residents of Den Bosch who died included schoemaker Van Gool, contractor Schnitzler, carpenter and contractor Martinus van Maaren (56 years old). From Waspik merchant Johannes Vermeulen (32 years old) died.

Two stokers were injured, of whom one was seriously injured and the other had burning wounds. The captain, machinist, kitchen maid and two children of the hofmeester Gerritsen, who were supposed to assist the conductor with the journey were unharmed.

== Aftermath ==
An investigation was launched into the cause of the explosion. Still in mid-November witnesses and experts were heard.

The accident brought the Zuid-Willemsvaart to a standstill for almost two weeks because the ship could not easily be towed away. A policy plan had to be made. Shipbuilder L. Smith from Kinderdijk made a plan to tow the sunken ship to the Dieze. This plan was successfully executed in the evening of 10 November 1849 by L. Smith himself and C. van Esch from Den Bosch.

In November 1849 the owners of the ship were sued for damage to Bastion No. 1.

On 30 November 1849 the steamboat's cave containing the tools were auctioned.
