= Doone =

Doone is a surname. It may refer to:

== People ==
- Allen Doone (1878–1948), American tenor and comic actor
- Gideon Doone, Micronesian politician, Governor of Chuuk State from 1986 to 1990
- James Joseph Hayes Doone (1888–1953), Canadian lawyer and political figure
- Peter Doone, New Zealand police officer and lawyer, Commissioner of Police from 1996 to 2000
- Rupert Doone (1903–1966), English dancer, choreographer, theatre director and teacher

== Fictional characters ==
- the title character of Lorna Doone, an 1869 novel, as well as various adaptations
- Carver Doone (the villain) and other members of the Doone clan, characters in the novel

== See also ==
- Doon (disambiguation)
