= Lyn Devon =

American fashion designer

Lyn Devon is a fashion designer of luxury American sportswear working in New York City. Her atelier is in Soho.

== Early life ==
Devon was born and raised in New York City. She is a 2002 graduate of Brown University.

== Career ==
After graduation, and an internship with Zac Posen, during which time she also studied fashion at Parsons School of Design, Devon worked for Ralph Lauren as an assistant designer. In 2006 Devon opened her own business and in Fall 2007 Devon had her debut runway presentation.

Devon won the prestigious Fashion Group International Rising Star of the Year Award in 2007. That same year, Devon's work was included in the Museum at the Fashion Institute of Technology's Arbiters of Style:Women at the Forefront of Fashion exhibit and several of her pieces were taken into their permanent collection. In 2008, Devon was one of ten young designers asked by The Washington Post to design an inaugural gown for Michelle Obama. In 2009 Devon won the Ecco Domani Fashion Foundation Award for Best Designer in Women's Ready to Wear. Devon was also one of 30 designers asked to submit their designs for Catherine Middleton's wedding gown. Devon's work has been featured in national and international publications, including Vogue, Harper's Bazaar, Elle, Town & Country, T: The New York Times Style Magazine,InStyle, Women's Wear Daily, W magazine, People, Real Simple magazine, Boston magazine, the Financial Times, the New York Post, and online publications including Style.com, NYMag.com, Elle.com, and Vogue.com.

She is a member of the Council of Fashion Designers of America (CFDA). Her work has been compared to that of the late Geoffrey Beene. She is a classical designer, with a youthful perspective, working in the tradition of luxury American sportswear.
