= Devens (name) =

Devens is a surname. Notable people with the surname are as follows:

- Charles Devens (1820–1891), American lawyer, jurist, and statesman
- Charlie Devens (1910–2003), American baseball player
- Mary Devens (1857–1920), American photographer
- Paul Devens (born 1965), Dutch contemporary artist
- Rick Devens (born 1984), American reality television personality
- Robert Devens (born 1972), American tennis player
- Sarah Devens (1973–1995), American ice hockey player
