= Debendra Prasad Ghosh =

Bengali writer

Debendra Ghosh (19th century C.E.) was a prominent 19th century Bengali writer. He was a major figure in the Vangiya Sahitya Parishad.
