= Devin N. Morris =

American artist

Devin N. Morris (born 1986 in Baltimore, Maryland) is an American artist who works in assemblage, collage, video, and installation art. The founder of 3 Dot Zine, which art critic Antwaun Sargent named one of "9 Zines by Black and POC Artists That You Need to Read Right Now," Morris's work has been exhibited in the group show "Cold Open Verse" at Knockdown Center and MoMA PS1 in Queens and has featured in solo exhibitions and Vice magazine.

== Early life, education, and career ==
Devin N. Morris was born in 1986 in Baltimore, and grew up in its downtown. He received a B.A. from the University of Maryland Eastern Shore in Fashion Merchandising in 2009 and another in Journalism and New Media from Towson University in Towson, Maryland in 2010. Morris had a career in fashion buying, merchandising, editorial styling, and writing before embarking upon fine art, and the influence of the industry (the use of fashion labels and drapery) can be seen in some of his work.

== Career ==
Morris took up fine art upon the encouragement of his friends. He has exhibited in group shows at George Washington University in Washington, D.C., Yale School of Art in New Haven, and in New York City, Newark, Rochester, Woodstock, Baltimore, Philadelphia, Minneapolis, Portland, Oregon, and Tacoma, Washington.

In 2014, Morris founded 3 Dot Zine, a collaborative zine for artists, writers, and other creatives of color described on the Visual AIDS website as "an annual publication that celebrates the futurity of minorities, in addition to serving as a forum for invited artists to center and elaborate on marginalized concerns."

Morris's video was included in the 2016 exhibition, "Cold Open Verse" at Knockdown Center in Maspeth, Queens and Printed Matter’s New York Art Book Fair at MoMA PS1. Organized by the duo Poet Transmit and publisher Blonde Art Books, it was an exhibition of theatrical trailers and self-produced commercials with a live broadcast program of performances that focussed on art and poetry publications. Morris performed, and the exhibition also featured Constance DeJong, Fiona Banner, and Moyra Davey.

In 2017 Morris founded Brown Paper Zine and Small Press Fair in New York City featuring the work of artists of color. The fair traveled to Baltimore. The same year he also presented an immersive art installation at AC Institute in New York in his solo exhibition that touched upon themes from the Black family album that usually go missing. Both were covered by Vice magazine. Morris has said:

"Collage provides a unique opportunity to use symbolism as a way to stitch together my history as a black American within a surreal imagined space where there aren't any limitations to my sexuality, race or any other socially defined constraint. Working through larger installations disrupts the use of the image as I look at images as a tie to reality."

== Personal life ==
Morris lives and work in Brooklyn.
