= Devona =

Devona may refer to:

- Devona (Night Watch), a term from the Russian novel.
- Devona or Divona, a Celtic river goddess.
- Devona, Roman name for the river Don, Scotland.
