= Devena =

Scientific classification
- Kingdom: Animalia
- Phylum: Arthropoda
- Class: Insecta
- Order: Lepidoptera
- Superfamily: Noctuoidea
- Family: Erebidae
- Subfamily: Calpinae
- Genus: Devena; Walker, 1858

Genus of moths

Devena is a genus of moths of the family Erebidae. The genus was erected by Francis Walker in 1858.

== Species ==
- Devena atomifera Walker, 1857
- Devena strigania Hampson, 1926
