= Devin Halbal =

American transgender blogger (born 1998)

Devin Halbal (born July 16, 1998) is a TikTok travel vlogger, writer, and community organizer. She has written about her experiences in multiple publications.

== Early life and education ==
Halbal was born and raised in Queens, New York. She studied media and human rights at Hunter College.

== Work ==
Halbal is openly trans and is an activist for trans experiences online and throughout media.
