= Devon Williamson =

New Zealand playwright

Devon Williamson is a New Zealand playwright, based in Tauranga. He has written plays that have been widely performed in New Zealand, as well as Australia, and will be performed in the United States. He mainly writes for the comedy genre.

== Biography ==
Williamson was born in Nelson, but moved to Tauranga in 1993. He is the co-founder of Detour Theatre, a theatre company in Tauranga. He has been working full-time in theatre, and related industries, for over 17 years and is currently employed by the Detour Theatre Trust as a director and tutor.

Williamson has a wife, Kim, who also directs for Detour Theatre, and two children. There have been over 50 theatre productions of Williamson's plays.

Williamson's plays have been performed extensively throughout New Zealand by community theatre groups, as well as in Australia. In September 2015 The Old People Are Revolting will be performed at the Topeka Civic Theatre in the United States.

== Work ==
Williamson mainly writes comedy and comedy-drama plays, and most feature small casts of less than 10.

Notable works by Williamson are:

- Crazy Ladies
- How To Train Your Husband
- Lost for Words
- Market Farces
- Menopause Made Me Do It
- My Husbands Nuts
- My Inlaws Are Outlaws
- Over Paid Over Sexed & Over Here
- The Old People Are Revolting
- Understanding Women
- 'Twas the Fight Before Christmas
