= Devine, Colorado =

Unincorporated community in Colorado, US

- Unincorporated community
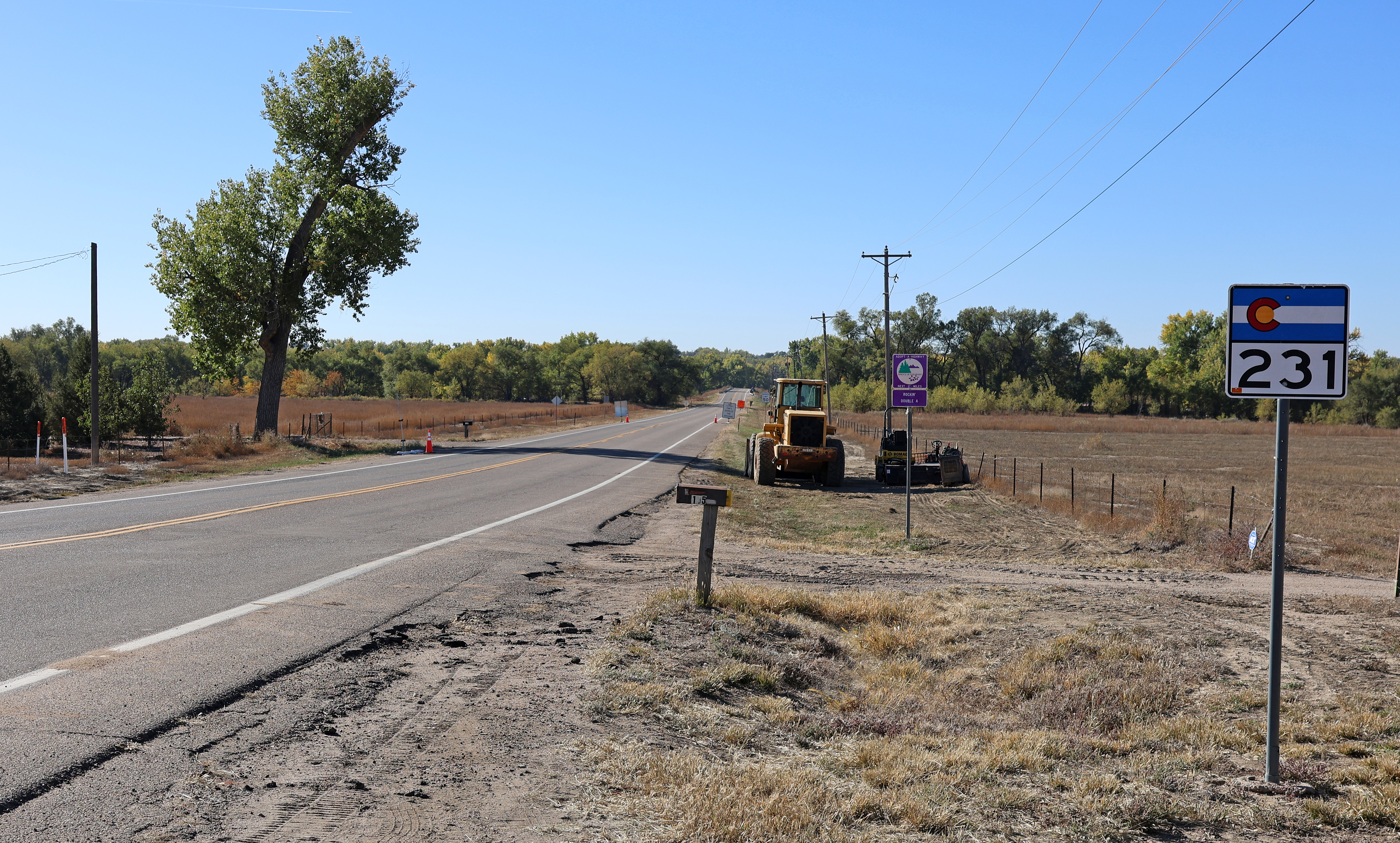
- Looking south along Colorado State Highway 231 in Devine.

- Location of the Devine, Colorado. Devine (Colorado)
- Coordinates: 38°16′30″N 104°27′27″W
- Country: United States
- State: Colorado
- County: Pueblo

Government
  - Type: Unincorporated community
  - Body: Pueblo County
- Elevation: 4,584 ft (1,397 m)
- Time zone: UTC−07:00 (MST)
  - Summer (DST): UTC−06:00 (MDT)
- ZIP code: Pueblo 81001
- Area code: 719
- GNIS place ID: 204799

Devine is an unincorporated community located in and governed by Pueblo County, Colorado, United States.

== History ==
The unincorporated community has never had its own post office. The Pueblo, Colorado, post office (ZIP code 81001) serves the area.

The community was named after Thomas Devine, a railroad official.

== See also ==
- Pueblo-Cañon City, CO Combined Statistical Area
- Front Range Urban Corridor
