= Bill Devan =

Scottish footballer

Personal information
- Full name: William Gemmell Devan
- Date of birth: 23 February 1909
- Place of birth: Whitletts, Ayrshire, Scotland
- Date of death: 12 December 1966 (aged 57)
- Place of death: Paddington, London, England
- Height: 5 ft 8 in (1.73 m)
- Position: Inside forward

Senior career*
Years	Team	Apps	(Gls)
1928–1929	Ayr United	2	(0)
1929–1931	Ards		
1931	Sanquhar		
1931–193x	Coleraine		
193x–1933	Linfield		
1933–1938	Watford	90	(33)
- * Club domestic league appearances and goals

William Gemmell Devan (23 February 1909 – 12 December 1966) was a Scottish professional footballer. He played as an inside forward in the English Football League, Scottish Football League and Irish Football League. He played four games, scoring once, during Watford's run in the 1937 Football League Third Division South Cup, but did not play in the final itself. He retired due to injury in 1938, but returned to Watford as a coach in 1958.
