= Devyn =

Devyn is a unisex given name of English origin, meaning “bard, poet,” perhaps meaning “young deer.” Devyn is a version of Devin (Irish, Gaelic). Devyn is also a form of Devon (English).

The name Devyn was given to 259 girls and 107 boys born in the US in 2015. Variants include Devyne and Devynne.

Notable people include:

== Devyn ==
- Devyn Dalton, Canadian actress and stuntwoman
- Devyn Galindo, American photographer
- Devyn Jambga (born 1995), American-Zimbabwean football (soccer) player
- Devyn Leask (born 1999), Zimbabwean swimmer
- Devyn Marble (born 1992), American basketball player
- Devyn Puett (born 1977), American actress and singer
- Devyn Rose, American singer-songwriter

== Devyne ==
- Devyne Rensch (born 2003), Dutch footballer

== Devynne ==
- Devynne Charlton (born 1995), Bahamian athlete specialising in the 100 metres hurdles
