= Devon (surname) =

Devon is a surname.

Those bearing it include:

- Devon (1977–), adult film actress
- Dayna Devon (born 1970)
- Lyn Devon (fl. c. 2000)
- Mari Devon (born 1960), American voice actress a.k.a. Jane Alan
- Richard Devon (1926–2010), American character actor

== Fictional characters ==
- Catarina Devon, a character from One Piece

== See also ==
- Samuel Devons
- Ely Devons
- Charles Devens
