= Devin, Minab =

Devin دوين
- Village
- Location within Iran
- Coordinates: 26°31′15″N 57°25′25″E
- Country: Iran
- Province: Hormozgan
- County: Minab
- Bakhsh: Senderk
- Rural District: Dar Pahn

Population (2006)
  - Total: 357
- Time zone: UTC+3:30 (IRST)
  - Summer (DST): UTC+4:30 (IRDT)

Devin (Persian: دوين, also Romanized as Devīn; also known as Deven, Doon, and Dūn) is a village in Dar Pahn Rural District, Senderk District, Minab County, Hormozgan Province, Iran. At the 2006 census, its population was 357, in 93 families.
