= Devendra Prabhudesai =

Devendra Prabhudesai is an Indian biographer and manager of media relations and corporate affairs for BCCI in Mumbai, India.

Prabhudesai's first book was An Umpire Remembers- the autobiography of Piloo Reporter. It was published by Rupa and is sponsored by Castrol India Limited. He also authored a 2007 book on the Cricket World Cup and wrote a biography of cricketer Rahul Dravid titled The Nice Guy who finished first.

His 2009 book SMG is about cricketer Sunil Manohar Gavaskar, former captain of the Indian cricket team. and had an unveiling on Saturday February 21, 2009 in the Mumbai metro. Devendra began working on the book in 2006, and said he wanted to pay tribute to his childhood hero. The subject of the book, Gavaskar, said of the author: "Devendra, there are some things you know about me which I didn't know myself. Just goes to show how much effort you put in this compilation." A write-up about the author and the book called the work a "must read and a worthy addition to your cricket library." Another write-up said, "the author has captured the mood of the times and the ethos of Bombay’s cricketing culture."

Prabhudesai is an alumnus of IES English Medium School, Dadar, commonly known as King George High School.
