= Delfina Foundation =

Arts organisation

Coordinates: 51°29′57.93″N 0°8′27.19″W

- Predecessor: The Delfina Studio Trust
- Formation: 2007
- Founder: Delfina Entrecanales CBE
- Type: Non-profit foundation
- Location: London
- Director: Aaron Cezar
- Website: delfinafoundation.com

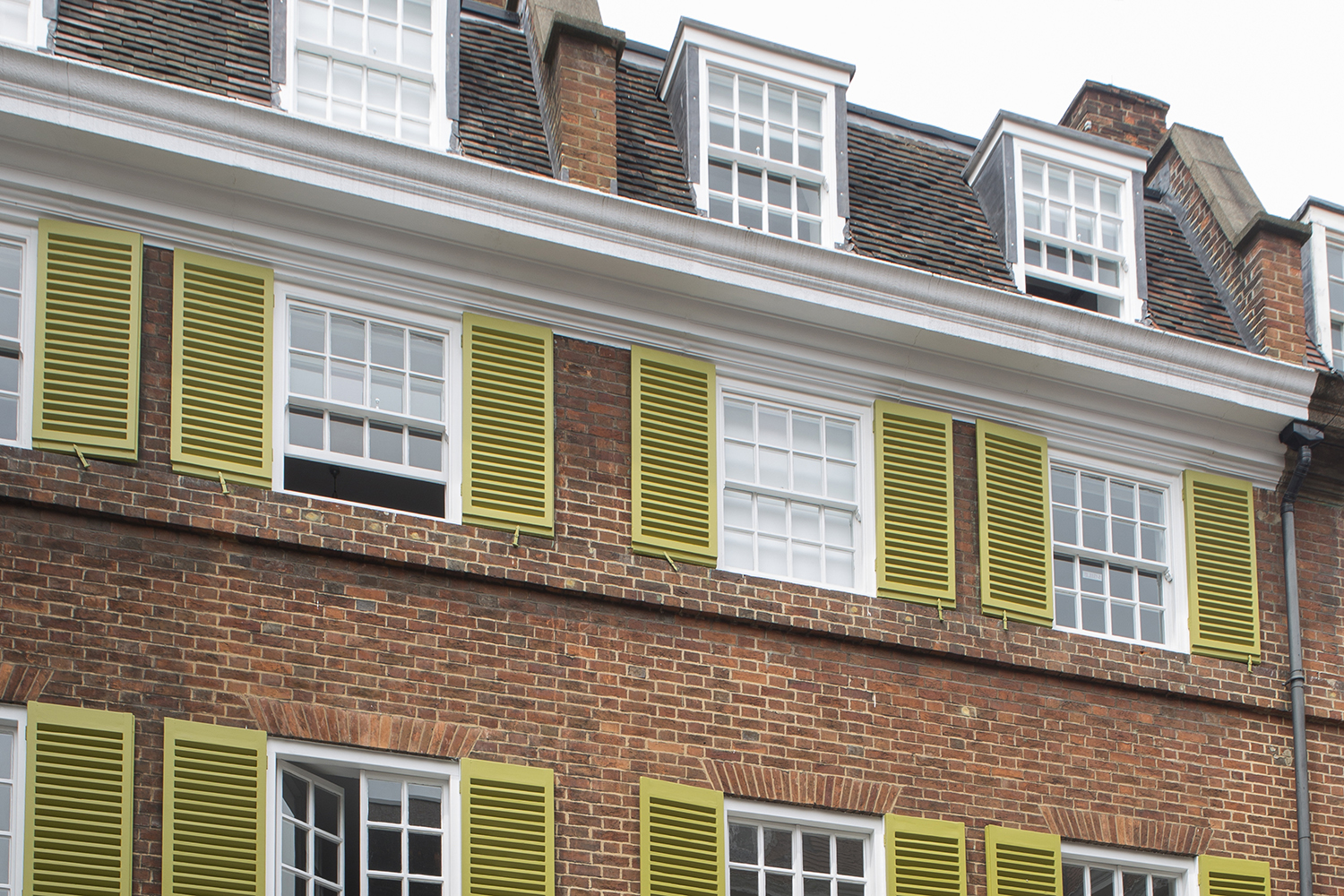
Delfina Foundation, 2014. Photo Tim Bowditch. Courtesy of Delfina Foundation

The Delfina Foundation is an independent, non-profit foundation dedicated to facilitating artistic exchange and developing creative practice through residencies, partnerships and public programming.

== About ==
Delfina Foundation was founded in 2007 by Delfina Entrecanales CBE, as the successor to Delfina Studio Trust, initially with an intention to nurture artists from Africa, South Asia and the Middle East. The foundation now works internationally with thematic (rather than geographic) programmes, which have explored a range of topics including, the politics of food, the public domain, performance, science and technology, and collecting.

The foundation is London's largest provider of international residencies.

The foundation began working around seasonal thematic programmes in 2014, when it reopened following an expansion of its Edwardian townhouse premises in Victoria, London. These themes are explored through residencies and public programming, including exhibitions, talks, performances, screenings and commissions.

== Building ==
Since its founding, Delfina Foundation has been located in Catherine Place, in Victoria, London. Initially the foundation occupied the Edwardian house at number 29, but in 2009 the foundation's patron Delfina Entrecanales bought the adjoining property allowing the foundation to expand and span the two houses. The expansion and renovation of the facility at 29-31 Catherine Place in 2014 was undertaken by London-based architects Studio Octopi and Egypt-based Shahira Fahmy Architects, the winners of a competition that promoted design collaboration between architects based in the UK and the greater Middle East. The £1.4m project doubled the residency capacity (from 4 to 8) and created 1,650 square feet of additional exhibition and event space, giving it a combined total area of 4,564 square feet, and making it London's largest artist residency provider.

In addition to the 8 bedrooms and exhibition space the property includes a communal kitchen area, an outdoor terrace and courtyard, the foundation's offices, and a library/resource room, which includes reference books, magazines, and other archives.

== Residency programme ==
Since its physical expansion in 2014, the foundation is able to host 6 to 8 residents at a time in its premises in Catherine Place. Practitioners are selected for residencies that last up to three-months through solicited proposals or nominations, or through targeted open calls. Since the foundation's shift to thematic programmes in 2014, this guides the open call and selection process and the foundation no longer has an overarching geographical remit that informs its residencies.

In addition to residencies at 29/31 Catherine Place, London, in the past the foundation has also provided residencies in a number of other locations in collaboration with various partner institutions, including in Beirut (2009), Bethlehem (2010), Damascus (2009 and 2010), Dubai (2011, 2012, 2013, 2014, 2016), Granada (2008), Halabja (2009), Muscat (2012), Ramallah (2012), and São Paulo (2012).

In 2017, as part of its thematic programme Collecting as Practice , the foundation supported a series of residencies for collectors. The collectors who undertook residencies, living alongside the artists in residence, were Alain Servais, Pedro Barbosa, Dorith Galuz, Lu Xun, Luba Michailova, Daisuke Miyatsu and Rudy Tseng.

== Thematic Programmes ==
Following its re-opening after the transformation of its building in 2014, Delfina Foundation initiated its new thematic programme structure. These themes inform the selection of residents, the hosting of exhibitions, and a public programme of events.

Programmes have included:

- Collecting as Practice: Initiated in spring 2017.
- Performance as Process (2 stages): Initiated in winter 2015, with a second stage in spring 2016, a third in spring 2018, and a fourth in winter 2020.
- The Politics of Food (3 seasons): Initiated spring in 2014, with a second season in spring 2015, a third in summer 2016, and a fourth in spring 2019.
- science_technology_society (2 seasons): Initiated in autumn 2019, with a second season in autumn 2020.
- Autonomy: Initiated in autumn 2014.
- The Public Domain (2 seasons): Initiated in winter 2014, with a second season in autumn 2015.

== Delfina Studio Trust ==
Delfina Foundation is the successor to the Delfina Studio Trust which opened in 1988 to provide free studios and related facilities for artists at a crucial time in the development of the British art scene. Initially these studios were located in an empty space above a jeans factory in East Stratford. The trust's founder Delfina Entrecanales CBE paid the rent and with the Royal College Arts invited a number of British artists to have a studio there for two years and foreign artists to have a studio and living accommodation for one year, all free of charge. For the first ten years the trust organised an annual exhibition by resident artists. In 1992 the trust moved to a converted chocolate factory at 50 Bermondsey Street. The new premises provided an exhibition space and 34 studios. Twelve studios were normally awarded as a prize with all related facilities provided free of charge for one or two years, and the remaining studios were rented at a heavily subsidised rate. The studios were notable for including a restaurant in the building, at which a communal table was designated for the resident artists who could eat lunch there for £1.

Following a trip to Syria in 2005, Delfina Entrecanales realised that artists there were also struggling to find work space. In 2007 the Delfina Studio Trust was reinvented as the Delfina Foundation, opening in its current location in Victoria with a renewed focus on artists from North Africa and the Middle East. Over its 20 years the trust supported over 400 artists and counts among its alumni artists a dozen Turner Prize winners and nominees such as including Shirazeh Houshiary, Jane & Louise Wilson, Mark Wallinger, Anya Gallacio, Tacita Dean, Glenn Brown, Mark Titchner, Martin Creed, Goshka Macuga, and Tomoko Takahashi.

== Collaborations ==
Delfina Foundation works extensively through international partnerships. Current and past partnerships include:

- A.I.R Dubai: An annual artists residency programme in partnership between Art Dubai, Dubai Culture and Arts Authority and Tashkeel, focused on artists based in the United Arab Emirates.
- Residency for Indian artists and curators: A collaboration with Charles Wallace India Trust and Inlaks Shivdasani Foundation, offering a three-month residency to a curator with Indian citizenship, living and working in India.
- Brooks International Fellowship Programme: A programme that calls for artists, curators and art historian, in collaboration with Tate, to apply for a three-month art residency to be part of Tate team, working at the gallery on a day-to-day basis and taking part in wider activities.
- Samdani Art Award: A bi-annual award that aims to support, promote and highlight emerging contemporary artists of Bangladesh in collaboration with Samdani Art Foundation and Bangladesh National Academy of Fine and Performing Arts.
- Mate: An annual residency for a Peruvian artist in collaboration with MATE Museo Mario Testino.
- The Silent University: a knowledge exchange platform by refugees, asylum seekers and migrants at Tate Modern, started in 2012 by artist Ahmet Ogut. It is led by a group of lecturers, consultants and research fellows.
- SAHA Association: Partnership with SAHA since 2013 on developing residency opportunities for Turkish cultural practitioners.
- Decolonizing Architecture Art Residency: An annual residency programme for UK artists and architects in Palestine in collaboration with DAAR.

== Exhibitions ==
Year	Month	Exhibition Title	Artists	Curator	Location
2019	Jul-Aug	Amma Baad	Nasser Al Salem	Maya El Khalil	Delfina Foundation
2019	Apr-Jun	Accumulation by Dispossession	Asunción Molinos Gordo	-	Delfina Foundation
2019	Jan-Mar	Power Play	Jungju An, Fayçal Baghriche, Jungki Beak, Soyoung Chung, Zuza Golinska, Jeremy Hutchison, Jaebum Kim, Bona Park, Oscar Santillan, Jasmijn Visser, and Lantian Xie	-	Delfina Foundation and Korean Cultural Centre UK (KCCUK)
2018	Sep-Dec	The Scar	Noor Afshan Mirza and Brad Butler	-	Delfina Foundation
2018	Apr-Jun	Between Too Soon and Too Late	Alex Mirutziu	-	Delfina Foundation
2018	Feb-Jun	Plan for Feminist Greater Baghdad	Ala Younis	-	Delfina Foundation
2018	Jan	ArteVue ArtePrize	Zuza Golińska, Sahil Naik, Kiah Reading, and Lukas Zerbst.	-	Delfina Foundation
2017	Sep-Nov	Private Collection: Unperformed Objects	Geumhyung Jeong	-	Delfina Foundation
2016	Sep-Nov	That Ends that Matter	Jean-Paul Kelly	-	Delfina Foundation
2016	Mar-Apr	Of Dice and Men	Didem Pekün	-	Delfina Foundation
2015	Oct-Nov	Then For Now	Anna Barriball, Simon Bill, Ian Dawson, Tacita Dean, Ceal Floyer, Anya Gallaccio, Lucy Gunning, Chantal Joffe, Margherita Manzelli, Ishbel Myerscough, Danny Rolph, Eva Rothschild, Mark Titchner, Mark Wallinger, Martin Westwood, Jane & Louise Wilson, and Richard Woods	Chantal Joffe and Sacha Craddock	Delfina Foundation
2015	Jun-Aug	Echoes & Reverberations	Jumana Emil Abboud, Basma Alsharif, Anas Al-Shaikh, Samah Hijawi, Magdi Mostafa, and Joe Namy	Aaron Cezar and Cliff Lauson - with Jane Scarth, Eimear Martin, and Dominik Czechowski	Hayward Gallery Project Space
2015	Jul-Aug	A Prologue to the Past and Present State of Things	Doa Aly, Marwa Arsanios, Coco Fusco, Emily Jacir, Mona Hatoum, Sharon Hayes, Mohammed Kazem, Xiao Lu, Hassan Sharif, Wael Shawky, Sharif Waked, Lin Yilin, and The Yes Men with Steve Lambert	Aaron Cezar - with Barrak Alzaid, Ala Younis, and Jane Scarth	Delfina Foundation
2015	May-Jun	Stirring the Pot of Story: Food, History, Memory	Cooking Sections, Leone Contini, Mella Jaarsma, Christine Mackey, Mounira Al Solh, and Raul Ortega Ayala	Nat Muller	Delfina Foundation
2014	Nov-Dec	Tales of an Imagined City	Hou Chien Cheng, Roy Dib, Virgínia de Medeiros, Jurandir Müller and Kiko Goifman, and Luiz Roque	João Laia	Delfina Foundation
2014	Oct-Nov	In the Year of the Quiet Sun	The Otolith Group	-	Delfina Foundation
2014	Feb-Mar	Let it not be said they were naively, fearfully, simply, just making art	Ayreen Anastas and Rene Gabri	-	The Showroom
2014	Jan-Feb	The Politics of Food	Abbas Akhavan, Gayle Chong Kwan, Leone Contini, Candice Lin, Asunción Molinos Gordo, Senam Okudzeto, Jae Yong Rhee, Zineb Sedira, Tadasu Takamine, and Raed Yassin	-	Delfina Foundation
2013	Oct-Nov	Bodies that Matter	Basel Abbas and Ruanne Abou-Rahme, Bashar Alhroub, Mustafa al Hallaj, Jeremy Hutchison, Jawad Al Malhi, and Olivia Plender	Rebecca Heald	Galeri Manâ
2013	Jun-Jul	Points of Departure	Bashar Alhroub, Bisan Abu Eiseh, Jeremy Hutchison, and Olivia Plender	Rebecca Heald with Mirna Bamieh	Institute of Contemporary Arts
2013	Apr-May	Seep	Nasrin Tabatabai and Babak Afrassiabi	-	Chisenhale Gallery
2013	Mar	A.I.R. Dubai 2013	Ebtisam Abdulaziz, Ammar al Attar, Dina Danish, Reem Falaknaz, Joe Namy, and Yudi Noor	Bérénice Saliou	House 11, Al Fahidi Historic Neighbourhood, Dubai
2012	Jun-Jul	Or Whistle Spontaneously	Ahmet Ögüt	-	Delfina Foundation
2012	Mar-May	Social States	Baptist Coelho and Nadia Kaabi-Linke	-	Pump House Gallery
2012	Mar	A.I.R. Dubai 2012	Zeinab Alhashemi, Hadeyeh Badri, Fayçal Baghriche, Magdi Mostafa, Nasir Nasrallah, and Deniz Üster	Alexandra MacGilp	House 11, Al Bastakiya, Bur Dubai, Dubai
2011	Jun-Jul	The Knowledge - Stop 3: Alexandria	Wael Shawky	-	Delfina Foundation
2011	Mar	House 44	Basel Abbas and Ruanne Abou-Rahme, Shamma Al Amri, Shaikha Al Mazrou, Abbas Akhavan, Rana Begum, Hind Bin Demaithan, Nisrine Boukhari, Tobias Collier, and Nathaniel Rackowe	-	House 44, Al Bastakiya, Bur Dubai, Dubai
2011	Jan-Feb	The Best of Sammy Clark	Raed Yassin	-	Delfina Foundation
2010	Nov-Dec	Studio Osep	Tayfun Serttaş	-	Delfina Foundation
2010	Oct	The Knowledge - Stop 2: Tehran	Mahmoud Bakhshi	-	Delfina Foundation
2010	Jul-Aug	The Spacemakers	Jawad al Malhi, Taysir Batniji, Nikolaj Bendix Skyum Larsen, decolonizing.ps (Alessandro Petti, Sandi Hilal, Eyal Weizman), Hala Elkoussy, Mounir Fatmi, Bouchra Khalili, Judy Price, Solmaz Shahbazi, and Basma Sharif	Eva Langret	Edinburgh College of Art
2010	Jun-Jul	New Works	Jawad Al Malhi	-	Delfina Foundation and The Mosaic Rooms
2010	Mar-Apr	New Works	Nathaniel Rackowe	-	Delfina Foundation
2010	Mar	Workspaces	Doa Aly, Delta Arts, Volkan Aslan, Ali Cherri, Robin Deacon, Iz Oztat, and the Western Alliance	-	Delfina Foundation
2010	Feb-Mar	New Works	Rana Begum	-	Delfina Foundation
2010	Jan	Nefertiti	Ala Younis	-	Delfina Foundation
2009	Oct-Nov	Morphospace	Tobias Collier	-	Delfina Foundation
2008	Sep-Oct	Wallscreen/Dreamland	Ismael Iglesias	-	Delfina Foundation
2008	Apr	Margins	Yazan Al-Khalili	-	Delfina Foundation
2007	Dec	KHRP	Olivia Arthur, Tom Carrigan, Olivia Heussler, Ed Kashi, Zbigniew Kosc, Kevin McKiernan, Susan Meiselas, Patrick Robert, and Eddy van Wessel	-	Delfina Foundation
