= Delfina Entrecanales =

Spanish arts philanthropist (1927–2022)

Delfina Entrecanales CBE
- Born: María Delfina Entrecanales de Azcárate; 10 April 1927; Spain
- Died: 1 April 2022 (aged 94)
- Occupations: Arts patron and philanthropist
- Known for: Founder and Chairwoman Emeritus of the Delfina Foundation

María Delfina Entrecanales de Azcárate CBE (10 April 1927 – 1 April 2022) was a Spanish-British arts patron and philanthropist, established in England since 1946.

She was the founder and Chairwoman Emeritus of the Delfina Foundation, an independent not-for-profit organisation devoted to supporting artists through a residency programme and exhibition space in London. She retired from the board of trustees in 2020.

== Early life ==
Entrecanales was born on 10 April 1927, into an affluent family, in southern Spain, the first child of industrialist José Entrecanales Ibarra and María de Azcárate. Her father, an engineer, was the founder of the company known today as Acciona and her mother came from a progressive family linked to the Institución Libre de Enseñanza.

By the end of the Spanish Civil War, many of her relatives were in exile and her father decided to send her abroad, away from Franco's dictatorship. She moved to Oxford to learn English and stayed at the household of Robert Mortimer, a scholar and priest – who later would become the Bishop of Exeter – and his wife, who tutored her. During her time in Oxford, she also met her first husband, a banker, with whom she had four children. One of her sons died at the age of 17 in a car accident, a tragic event that marked her life.

When her marriage ended, after 20 years, she decided to stay in England, instead of returning to Spain, and became a socialite and a patron. In the 1970s, she bought a farm with several cottages in Little Bedwin, Wiltshire, where she hosted a number of musicians, providing them with accommodation and space to work. She first offered to her friend Robert Wyatt, formerly of the band Soft Machine, the possibility to set up his recording studio at the farm while he was recovering from an accident. The resultant album was Rock Bottom, released in 1974, which included musical performances by Ivor Cutler, Hugh Hopper, Richard Sinclair, Laurie Allan, Mike Oldfield and Fred Frith, and was produced by Pink Floyd's Nick Mason.

Even though her intention was to keep supporting musicians, following the advice of a friend who taught at the Royal College of Art, she decided to shift her patronage activity to the visual arts after realizing that the equipment musicians would need was far too expensive. In the meantime, she married her second husband, Digby Squires, who was 25 years younger than her. The couple stayed together for 30 years and worked together to establish the Delfina Studio Trust.

== Contribution to the arts ==
In 1988 the Delfina Studio Trust opened its doors at a former jeans factory in Stratford, east London. Four years later, it moved to a bigger space in Bermondsey Street, a former chocolate factory that after being refurbished provided accommodation, studio rooms, a gallery and a canteen where artists could eat for £1. A long list of artists were supported by the Delfina Studio Trust, including Glenn Brown, Jane & Louise Wilson, Keith Tyson, Maud Cotter, Mark Francis, Mark Wallinger, Tacita Dean, Thomas Demand and Tomoko Takahashi, among many others. Some of those artists later became winners or finalists of some of the most prestigious awards in the sector, including the Turner Prize.

After the end of her second marriage, Entrecanales withdrew from her activity as a patron for some time but then in 2005, during a trip to Syria with her close friend and international human rights lawyer Mark Muller, she decided to resume her work supporting artists. In 2007, the Delfina Foundation opened to the public, housed in an Edwardian building near Victoria, in central London. Although initially it had a particular focus on Middle Eastern and North African artists, the work of the foundation is no longer limited to any specific geographical focus.

Entrecanales then bought the house next door and combined the two properties into one unified structure, designed by London's Studio Octopi and Cairo-based architect Shahira Fahmy, which has space to host eight artists and also includes a library, communal kitchen, offices and an exhibition space. Coinciding with the opening of the new building, the programme also shifted from a regional focus to a thematic approach, starting with a pluriannual residential programme on "the Politics of Food".

Unlike most patrons, Entrecanales was not an art collector and instead defined herself as a "collector of artists", having supported more than 600 artists worldwide with her philanthropic work: "The one thing I want you to make clear is that I am not a collector. I collect artists, not art!". Establishing a deep connection with artists was what drove her work: "Meeting inspiring people, and inspiring other people. My relationship with the artists is why I've done it; all the other things, I don't care about it. I am like a grandmother, to all of them."

In recognition of her contribution to the arts, Entrecanales was made a Commander of Order of the British Empire (CBE) in the Queen's Birthday Honours in 2012, the year of the Diamond Jubilee, and she was also the recipient of The Prince of Wales Medal for Philanthropy in the Arts in 2013. In 2016, a Spanish association of female entrepreneurs (Asociación Mujer Siglo XXI, based in Bilbao) also gave her an award for her patronage work. She retired from the Board of Trustees of the Delfina Foundation in 2020.

== Death ==
Entrecanales' death, at the age of 94, was confirmed on 1 April 2022. No cause of death was given.
