= DAAR =

DAAR may refer to:

- Decolonizing Architecture Art Residency, Palestine
- Disney's Art of Animation Resort, Florida, United States
- Dulles Airport Access Road, Virginia, United States
