= Antonio Scarponi =

Italian architect and designer

- Born: 1974 (age 51–52); Rimini, Italy
- Citizenship: Italian
- Education: Università Iuav di Venezia; The Cooper Union
- Occupations: Architect, designer, educator, researcher
- Known for: Conceptual Devices; Urban agriculture and participatory design

Antonio Scarponi (born 1974) is an Italian architect, designer, educator and researcher based in Zurich, Switzerland. He is the founder of the research-based studio Conceptual Devices and co-founder of the Institute for Spatial Thinking. Scarponi's work spans drawing, installation, architectural design and social design.

== Early life and education ==
Scarponi was born in Rimini, Italy. He trained as an architect at the Istituto Universitario di Architettura di Venezia (IUAV) and studied as a visiting student at The Cooper Union in New York City. He completed a PhD in Urbanism at Università Iuav di Venezia.

== Career ==
Scarponi's early work focused on information design, demographic cartography and the emergence of digital networks as spatial infrastructures. In 2001 he created a demographic cartogram of Internet users, which evolved into the Human World series (2001–2007) of population-scaled cartograms.

His practice later emphasized design as a form of knowledge production, employing "as found" objects, instruction manuals and participatory self-production strategies, often addressing sustainability and resource scarcity.

Notable projects include Re-Use (2004), RIKEA (2008), Wired Unplugged (2009), Just Undo It (2009) and Readykea (2011).

=== Urban agriculture and self-production ===
Building on his earlier research into demographic growth, resource scarcity and distributed design, Scarponi has explored soilless urban agriculture and vertical farming using hydroponic and aquaponic cultivation systems.

Key projects in this area include:

- Malthus: A Meal a Day (2011), an aquaponic installation named after Thomas Malthus, investigating food production and domestic cultivation in the context of population growth and resource limits.
- ELIOOO (2013), an open-source hydroponic device for domestic food production assembled from commercially available IKEA components, accompanied by instruction manuals published in multiple languages.
- UF-01 (2011), a proof-of-concept urban rooftop aquaponic farm in Basel, Switzerland.
- Hedron (2012), a modular aquaponic system featuring a geodesic icosahedral structure designed to address structural and environmental challenges of rooftop farming.
- Farm-X (2014), a project exploring scalable urban farming systems and vertically integrated food production infrastructures.

=== Urban devices and spatial interventions ===
Scarponi often conceives spatial interventions as devices or dispositifs. His notable projects in this area include:

- Hotello. Somnia et Labora (2013), a portable, modular room-in-a-trunk system designed in collaboration with visual artist Roberto de Luca and the Swiss firm Das Konzept. First showcased at Fabbrica del Vapore during Milan Design Week, the project explores the concept of "minimum habitat" in response to the increasing mobility of the workforce and the availability of vacant urban spaces.
- Campo Libero / The Innocent House (2016), an off-grid pavilion commissioned for the Italian Pavilion at the Venice Architecture Biennale. The project investigated the integration of cultivation systems, domestic functions and temporary structures for collective use, developed in relation to agricultural lands confiscated from organized crime in southern Italy in collaboration with the association Libera.
- La Città Libera (2018), a project extending earlier investigations into collective inhabitation, self-organized urban systems and temporary public infrastructures through exhibitions, workshops and public programs. It received a nomination for the Swiss Art Awards.
- Jungfrau Pavilion (2018), a temporary architectural installation for the Art Container festival in Stelisburg, Switzerland. The pavilion served as a public gathering space and translated the silhouette of the Jungfrau mountain chain into a habitable geometric structure.

=== Teaching and research ===
Since 2013 Scarponi has taught at the Zurich University of the Arts (ZHdK), developing the Art and Space programme and co-directing the Certificate of Advanced Studies in Transforming Space. (Note: Antonio Scarponi, "The Knowledge of the Form", in Art, Self & System, edited by Donatella Bernardi, Sternberg Press, 2019, chapter 1 , pp. 37–58. ISBN 978-3-95679-488-9) He co-developed the Hic et Nunc project (2015–2019) addressing spatial interventions in temporary asylum seeker camps. Since 2024, Scarponi has also taught Exhibition Design in the Master's programme in Cultural Critique and Curatorial Studies at the Zurich University of the Arts, directed by Anselm Franke.

== Exhibitions ==
- 2024: Detour, Pianacoteca Ambrosiana, Milan
- 2022: La Sedia Innocente ed Altre Storie, Isola Design District, Milan
- 2022: Edible. The Architecture of Metabolism, Tallinn Architecture Biennale
- 2022: Plant Fever, CID Grand Hornou, Belgium
- 2021: Planet Love: Climate Care in the Digital Age, Biennale for Change, Museum of Applied Arts, Vienna
- 2018: Storie. Il Design Italiano, Triennale Design Museum, Milan
- 2018: Social Design, Museum für Gestaltung Zürich
- 2017: 99 Domande Sull’Abitare, Triennale Design Museum, Milan
- 2016: Taking Care, Italian Pavilion, XV Venice Architecture Biennale
- 2009: International Architecture Biennale Rotterdam, NAI, Rotterdam
- 2008: Torino Geodesign, PalaFuksas, Turin
- 2003: Empowerment, Museo Villa Croce, Genoa
- 2003: XI Biennial of Young Artists of Europe and the Mediterranean Sea, Athens
- Source: - Zurich University of the Arts

== Books ==
- Scarponi, Antonio. La Sedia Innocente e Altre Storie di Vita, Libertà e Design. Zurich: 3rdO Books, 2022. ISBN 978-3-9525635-1-9
- Scarponi, Antonio. ELIOOOO. Wie Du mithilfe von IKEA® ein Gerät baust, um zuhause Essen anzupflanzen. Zurich: 3rdO Books, 2016. ISBN 978-3-9524132-0-3
- Scarponi, Antonio. ЭЛИООО. Как из предметов IKEA® соорудить устройство для выращивания продуктов питания у себя дома. Zurich: 3rdO Books, 2015. ISBN 978-3-9524132-7-2
- Scarponi, Antonio. ELIOOO. IKEA®製品を使った自家栽培装置の作り方. Zurich: 3rdO Books, 2014. ISBN 978-3-9524132-4-1
- Scarponi, Antonio. ELIOOO. How to go to IKEA® and build a device to grow food in your apartment. Zurich: 3rdO Books, 2013. ISBN 978-3-9524132-0-3

== Awards ==
- 2025: Finalist – Simon Architecture Prize
- 2022: Nomination – Fuorisalone Award
- 2018: Nomination – Swiss Art Awards
- 2018: Nomination – Mies van der Rohe Award
- 2017: First Prize – Die Besten 2017, Hochparterre
- 2015: Nomination – Katerva Award
- 2008: Curry Stone Design Prize
- 2009: 3rd Prize – Rotterdam Architecture Biennale
- Source: - Zurich University of the Arts
