= Anselm Franke =

German curator and writer

- Born: 1978 (age 46–47); Heiligenberg, Germany
- Occupation(s): Curator and writer

Anselm Franke (born 1978) is a German curator, and writer. He was the head of Visual Art and Film at the Haus der Kulturen der Welt from 2013–2022.

== Life and career ==
Franke was born in Heiligenberg (Baden-Württemberg). He holds a PhD in Visual Cultures/Center for Research Architecture at Goldsmiths, University of London. He started his career as assistant director to Christoph Schlingensief.

Franke worked as a curator of interdisciplinary research projects and festivals in several theatres, including: the Volksbühne am Rose-Luxemburg-Platz and Hebbel am Ufer in Berlin until 2006, often in collaboration with Hannah Hurtzig. From 2001–2006, he worked at KW Institute for Contemporary Art, where he curated numerous exhibitions, among them, Territories, along with Eyal Weizman, Rafi Segal and Stefano Boeri in 2004 and No matter how bright the light, the crossing occurs at night, along with artists Natascha Sadr Haghighian, Ines Schaber and Judith Hopf in 2005. Later, he was artistic director at Kunsthal Extra City in Antwerp from 2006–2010, where he curated exhibitions such as Self-Fashion Show (2007), Mimétisme (2008) and Drawing Documents (2009). His multi-chapter exhibition project, Animism, shown in Bern, Antwerp, Vienna and Berlin (2010-2014). In 2013, Franke was listed among the 100 most powerful people in the artworld in the yearly ranking by the ArtReview.

== Selected exhibitions ==
- 2017–2020 Love and Ethnology. The Colonial Dialectics of Sensitivity (after Hubert Fichte), Haus der Kulturen der Welt and Goethe-Institut, with chapters in Lisbon, Salvador de Bahia, Rio de Janeiro, Dakar, Santiago de Chile, New York
- 2018 Parapolitics: Cultural Freedom and the Cold War, HKW Berlin
- 2017 Interrupted Survey : Fractured Modern Mythologies, ACC Gwangju
- 2012 Modern Monsters. Death and Life of Fiction, Taipei Biennale
- 2010–2014 Animism, Extra City and MuHKA Antwerpen, Kunsthalle Bern, Generali Foundation Vienna, HKW Berlin, Ashkal Alwan Beirut, Ilmin Museum Seoul, E-flux New York, OCAT Shenzhen

== Selected publications ==
- Territories. Islands, Camps and Other States of Utopia, ed. ISBN 978-3-8837573-4-6
- B-Zone-Becoming Europe and Beyond ISBN 978-8-4965400-5-7
- Animism (Volume I), ed. ISBN 978-1-933128-95-5
- Secret Modernity – Selected Writings and Interviews 1981–2009, ed. ISBN 978-1-933128-96-2
- Ape Culture / Kultur der Affen ISBN 978-3-9590500-6-7
- Neolithische Kindheit: Kunst in einer falschen Gegenwart, ca. 1930
