= Wael Shawky =

Egyptian artist (born 1971)

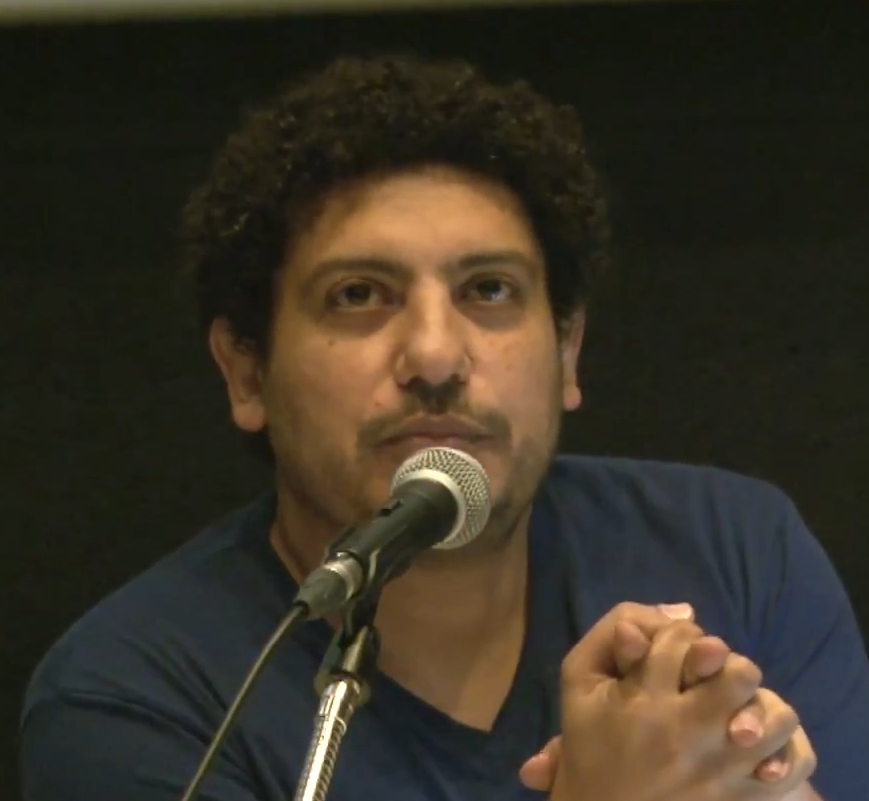
- Shawky in 2016

Wael Shawky (born 1971) is an Egyptian artist working between Alexandria and Philadelphia. Shawky gained international recognition for his works that trace the history of the Crusades through a Middle Eastern lens. Shawky has won many awards and prizes for his work, including the Ernst Schering Foundation Art Award in 2011 and the Mario Merz Prize (2015) for his film trilogy, Al Araba Al Madfuna. He is represented by Sfeir-Semler Gallery, Galleria Lia Rumma and Lisson Gallery.

== Early life and education ==
Shawky was born in Alexandria, Egypt in 1971 and spent his youth in Mecca, Saudia before returning to Egypt when he was 13. He holds an MFA from the University of Pennsylvania and a BFA from Alexandria University.

== Career ==
Based on extensive periods of research and enquiry, Wael Shawky’s work tackles notions of national, religious and artistic identity through film, performance and storytelling. Shawky frames contemporary culture through the lens of historical tradition and vice versa. Mixing truth and fiction, childlike wonder and spiritual doctrine, Shawky has staged epic recreations of the medieval clashes between Muslims and Christians in his trilogy of puppets and marionettes.

In 2011, Shawky presented his work at the 12th Istanbul Biennial. In 2012 he exhibited at dOCUMENTA (13) in Kassel, Germany where he premiered the second part of Cabareh Crusades (The Path to Cairo). In 2013, he created a live performance piece for the Sharjah Biennial from his 'Dictums' series, where 30 workers (primarily of Pakistani descent) sing a song in qawwali, a form of Sufi devotional music with words borrowed from the curatorial statement of the Biennial. Shawky went on to receive the Sharjah Biennial prize for the work In 2010, Shawky launched MASS Alexandria, the first independent studio programme for young artists in Alexandria, Egypt.

In 2015, Shawky had an exhibition entitled "Crusades and Other Stories" at the Mathaf: Arab Museum of Modern Art.

In his film trilogy Cabaret Crusades, Wael takes as his subject the complex historical and sociopolitical narratives surrounding the Christian Holy Wars. The series began in 2010 and was finally completed in January 2015, when it premiered at MoMA P.S.1, New York. Cabaret Crusades consists of three films: The Horror Show File, The Path to Cairo, and The Secrets of Karbala, loosely inspired by Lebanese writer Amin Maalouf's The Crusades Through Arab Eyes. Shawky's films depict various historical accounts in an attempt to provide and illustrate an Arab perspective on the Crusades (from 1095 to 1204). All the characters in Shawky's three films are played by marionettes and feature Classical Arabic. The second episode, The Path to Cairo, featured marionettes made of clay – a material believed to be what humans are made of according to the Qu'ran.

In 2016, Shawky had solo shows at the Kunsthaus Bregenz in Austria and the Fondazione Merz and Castello di Rivoli, both in Turin, Italy. In 2014, Serpentine Galleries in London held a solo exhibition of his work. Shawky's works can be found in numerous public collections, most notably the Museum of Modern Art (MoMA), in New York City, US, the National Gallery of Canada, in Ottawa, Canada, and the Tate Collection, in London, UK. He is represented by Lisson Gallery.

In 2017, Wael Shawky premiered 'Song of Roland: The Arabic Version' at the opening of the theater festival Theater der Welt in Hamburg, Germany. The large musical and theatrical installation translates the epic French verse 'La Chanson de Roland' (Song of Roland) into classic Arabic and features performances by 25 fidjeri singers.

In 2017, Shawky undertook a residency at Mathaf: Arab Museum of Modern Art, in partnership with the Fire Station, in Doha, Qatar, where he conducted research for his first feature-length film on the history of oil production in the Persian Gulf. Filming for the project began in 2018.

In 2024, Shawky was selected to represent Egypt at the 60th Venice Biennale.

In November 2024, Shawky was appointed as the first artistic director of the Fire Station in Doha.

== Exhibitions ==
- 2025 Telematch And Other Stories, Barakat Contemporary, Seoul, South Korea
- 2025 Drama 1882, Talbot Rice Gallery, ECA, Edinburgh, UK
- 2025 Drama 1882, The Geffen Contemporary, MOCA, Los Angeles, California, USA
- 2024 Egyptian Pavillon, La Biennale Di Venezia 2024 (forthcoming)
- 2023 I am Hymns of the New Temples, Sfeir-Semler Karantina, Beirut, Lebanon
- 2023 I Am Hymns of the New Temples, Pompeii Archaeological Park, Pompeii, Italy
- 2023 In the Heart of Another Country: The Diasporic Imagination Rises, Sharjah Art Foundation, Sharjah, UAE
- 2023 Alexandria: Past Futures, MUCEM, Marseille, France
- 2023 MACBA Collection. Prelude. Poetic Intention, MACBA, Barcelona, Spain
- 2023 In The Heart of Another Country, Deichtorhallen Hamburg, Germany
- 2022 Dry Culture Wet Culture, Museum Leuven, Belgium
- 2022 Cabaret Crusades: The Horror Show File, Tate Modern, London, United Kingdom
- Alexandria: Past Futures, Bozar Centre for Fine Arts, Brussels, Belgium
- 2021 FOCUS: Wael Shawky, Modern Art Museum of Fort Worth, Texas, USA
- 2019 Al Araba Al Madfuna, The Polygon Gallery, Vancouver, Canada
- 2019 Gohyang: Home, SeMA, Seoul Museum of Art, Seoul, South Korea
- 2019 Look for Me All Around You, Sharjah Biennial 14, Sharjah Art Foundation, UAE
- 2018 The Crusades and Current Stories, ARoS, Aarhus Kunstmuseum, Aarhus, Denmark
- 2018 Crude, Jameel Arts Center, Dubai, UAE
- 2018 Beyond Borders, Boghossian Foundation, Brussels, Belgium
- 2018 Wael Shawky, Lia Rumma Gallery, Naples, Italy
- 2018 Cabaret Crusades, Gangwon international BIENNALE, Korea
- 2018 Al Araba Al Madfuna III, Galerie Sfeir-Semler, Hamburg, Germany
- 2018 The Song of Roland: The Arabic Version, Sharjah Art Foundation, Sharjah, United Arab Emirates
- 2018 The Song of Roland: The Arabic Version, The Theater an der Wien, The Opera House, Vienna, Austria
- 2018 Al Araba Al Madfuna III, St. Elmo Exam Center, Valletta, Malta
- 2017 Al Araba Al Madfuna, Museum of Contemporary Art (MOCA), Yinchaun, China
- 2017 The Song of Roland: The Arabic Version, Theatre de Welt, Kampnagel, Hamburg, Germany
- 2017 The Song of Roland: The Arabic Version, Stadsschouwburg Amsterdam, Holland Festival, Amsterdam, Holland
- 2017 The Song of Roland: The Arabic Version, Onasis cultural center, Athens, Greece
- 2017 Focus on Wael Shawky, Onasis Cultural Center, Athens, Greece
- 2017 Focus on Wael Shawky, National Museum of Contemporary Art, Athens, Greece
- 2017 Cabaret Crusades: The Path to Cairo, Palazzo Branciforte, Palermo, Sicily
- 2017 Al Araba Al Madfuna III, Saints Euno and Giuliano Church, Palermo, Sicily
- 2017 Cabaret Crusades trilogy screening, Gene Siskel Film Center, Chicago, USA
- 2016 Cabaret Crusades, Castello di Rivoli, Turin, Italy
- 2016 Al Araba Al Madfuna, Fondazione Merz, Turin, Italy
- 2016 Wael Shawky, Kunsthaus Bregenz, Bregenz, Austria
- 2016 Wael Shawky, Al Araba Al Madfuna III, Fondazione Merz, Zurich, Switzerland
- 2016 Wael Shawky. Drawing, Lisson Gallery, Milan, Italy
- 2015 Cabaret Crusades: The Secrets of Karbala, Sfeir Semler Karantina, Beirut, Lebanon.
- 2015 Cabaret Crusades, MoMA PS1, New York, USA
- 2015 Crusades and Other Stories, MATHAF: Arab Museum of Modern Art, Doha, Qatar
- 2015 Cabaret Crusades trilogy screenings, Palais Royal – Musée du Louvre, Paris, France
- 2014 Cabaret Crusades, K20 Museum: Kunstsammlung Nordrhein-Westfalen, Dusseldorf, Germany
- 2014 Al Araba Al Madfuna II, Festwochen-Zentrum im Künstlerhaus, Vienna, Austria
- 2014 Horsemen Adore Perfumes and Other Stories, Sharjah Art Foundation, Sharjah, United Arab Emirates
- 2014 Dictums, Lisson Gallery, London, United Kingdom
- 2013 al-Qurban/The Offering, Serpentine Gallery, London, United Kingdom
- 2013 Cabaret Crusades, Ludwig Forum, Aachen, Germany
- 2013 Cabaret Crusades: The Horror Show File, The Hammer Museum, Los Angeles, CA, USA
- 2013 Wael Shawky, Art Gallery of York University, Toronto, Canada
- 2013 Cabaret Crusades: The Path to Cairo, Pinault Collection, Teatrino Palazzo Grassi, Venice, Italy
- 2012 Al Araba Al Madfuna, KW: Kunst-Werke Institute, Berlin, Germany
- 2011 Wael Shawky, Nottingham Contemporary, Nottingham, United Kingdom
- 2011 Drawings and Flags from Cabaret Crusades, Walker Art Gallery, National Museums, Liverpool, UK
- 2011 Larvae Channel, Delfina Foundation, London, UK
- 2010 Contemporary Myths, Cittadellarte – Fondazione Pistoletto, Biella, Italy
- 2010 Contemporary Myths II, Sfeir-Semler Karantina, Beirut, Lebanon
- 2009 Larvae Channel 2, Project Gentili, Berlin, Germany
- 2009 Clean History, Townhouse Gallery, Cairo, Egypt
- 2009 Wael Shawky, Darat al Funun, Amman, Jordan
- 2007 Then you will return to me and I will judge between you in the matters in which you used to dispute, Kunsthalle Winterthur, Winterthur, Switzerland
- 2007 Digital Church, Collective Gallery, Edinburgh, United Kingdom
- 2007 The Forty Days Road, Wet Culture – Dry Culture, Galeria Sztuki Wspolczesnej, Bunkier Sztuki, Krakow, Poland
- 2007 Al Aqsa Park, YAMA, digital screen on top of Marmara Hotel, Istanbul, Turkey
- 2007 Telematch Sadat/Telematch Market/Al Aqsa Park, Koninklijke Vlaamse Schouwburg, Brussels, Belgium
- 2007 Telematch Sadat/Al Aqsa Park, Hebbel am Ufer 3, Berlin, Germany
- 2007 Telematch Sadat, San Matteo Church, Lucca, Italy
- 2006 Drawings 1998–2006, Townhouse Gallery, Cairo, Egypt
- 2005 The Green Land Circus, Factory Space, Townhouse Gallery, Cairo, Egypt
- 2005 Wael Shawky, Ludwigsburg Kunstverein, Ludwigsburg, Germany
- 2003 Asphalt Quarter, Townhouse Gallery, Cairo, Egypt
- 2002 When he decided to visit the Christmas village, Townhouse Gallery, Cairo, Egypt
- 2001 Transitions, Ashkal Alwan, Beirut, Lebanon
- 2001 Sidi El Asphalt’s Moulid, Townhouse Gallery, Cairo, Egypt

== Awards ==
- 2017 The Honorary Citizenship of the City of Palermo, Italy
- 2015 Mario Merz Prize, Turino, Italy
- 2013 Louis Vuitton and Kino der Kunst Award for Filmic Oeuvre, Munich, Germany
- 2013 Prize of Sharjah Biennale 11th, for dictums 10:120, Performance, Sharjah, UAE
- 2012 Abraaj Capital Art Prize, Dubai, UAE
- 2011 Kunstpreis der Schering Stiftung, Kunst-Werke Institute, Berlin, Germany
- 2011 Artist-in-Residence, Center for Possible Studies, Serpentine Gallery, London, United Kingdom
- 2009 Grand Prize, 25th Alexandria Biennale, Alexandria, Cairo
- 2007 Ford Foundation Grant, Cairo, Egypt
- 2005 International Commissioning Grant, Lower Manhattan Cultural Council, New York, USA
- 2004 International Award of the Islamic World Arts Initiative, Arts International, New York, USA
- 2004 American Center Foundation Grant, Philadelphia, USA
- 2001 Honorary Award, Rita Longa International, Codema, Bayamo, Cuba
- 2000 Piero Dorazio Award, University of Pennsylvania, Philadelphia, USA
- 1996 Grand Nile Prize, International Cairo Biennial 6th, Cairo, Egypt
- 1994 Grand Akhenaten Prize, Salon of Youth 6th, Akhenaten Centre of Arts, Cairo, Egypt
