= The Brown Collection =

Art museum in London, England

Coordinates: 51°31′03″N 0°09′02″W

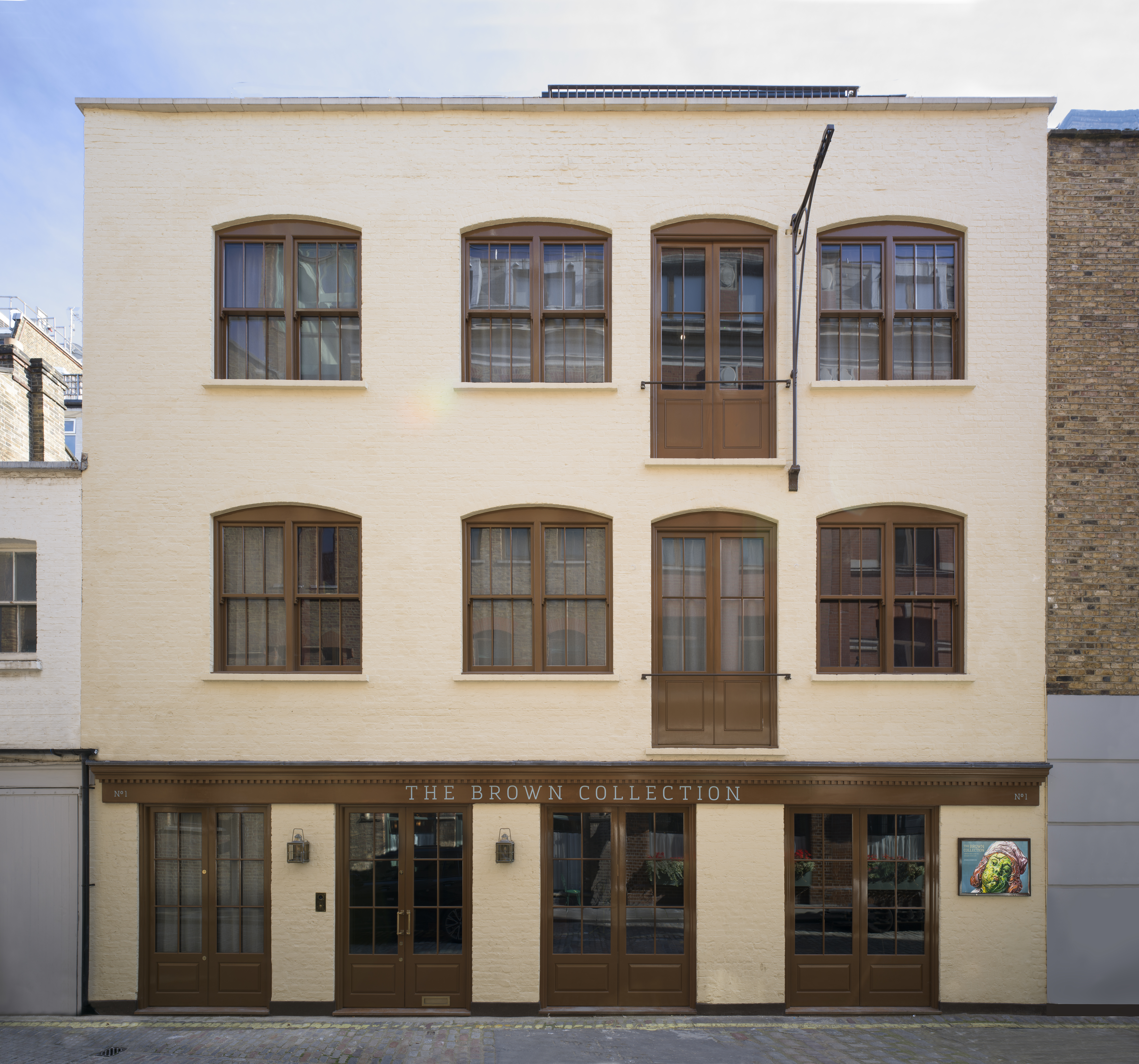
- Established: October 2022
- Location: 1 Bentinck Mews, Marylebone, London
- Type: Art Museum
- Founder: Glenn Brown (artist)
- Public transit access: Bond Street
- Website: www.the-brown-collection.co.uk

The Brown Collection is a museum in Marylebone, central London founded by British contemporary artist Glenn Brown. Opened to the public in October 2022, the renovated 1905 mews warehouse has four floors of exhibition space, an archive and offices. Admission to the public is free.

The museum answers Brown’s long-held desire for a permanent place in London to show his collection. Located on Bentinck Mews, The Brown Collection is a short walk from the Wallace Collection, the Royal Academy of Music, Wigmore Hall and Frieze – all of which have significance for the artist.

== The collection ==
The Brown Collection includes both Brown’s own work and his extensive collection of works by other artists, predominantly of Old Masters, but also of 20th- and 21st-century artists. Among them are Gillian Wearing, Abraham Bloemaert, Henri Fantin-Latour, Grace Pailthorpe, Hans Hartung, Austin Osman Spare and Gaetano Gandolfi.

Gallery 4

Glenn Brown views The Brown Collection like a work of art. He says, ‘I’m concerned about it being something that I can play with, use as a mode of expression for myself. It’s a place to experiment'. Keen to show his own work alongside that of other artists – drawing largely on his own collection but sometimes borrowing – Brown was determined to have a place to exhibit works in such a way that they would speak to each other.

== Building ==
Beginning in 2016, 1 Bentinck Mews took six years to renovate. It is built on the site of two 18th century mews which, typically, would have provided accommodation for household servants, and for activities such as baking and laundry.

The aim of the renovation was to restore the building’s structure to its 1905 integrity and to give it a more inviting, comfortable feel inside. “We basically took it back to its four external walls,” Brown says, after it “had been messed around with a great deal over the last 100 years. But I wanted to make it look like nothing much has happened to it. We tried to get it back to its original state as much as possible.” He wants it to be “the ideal space to show my paintings in, which is not big and vacuous and alienating, but not too cosy and domestic”.

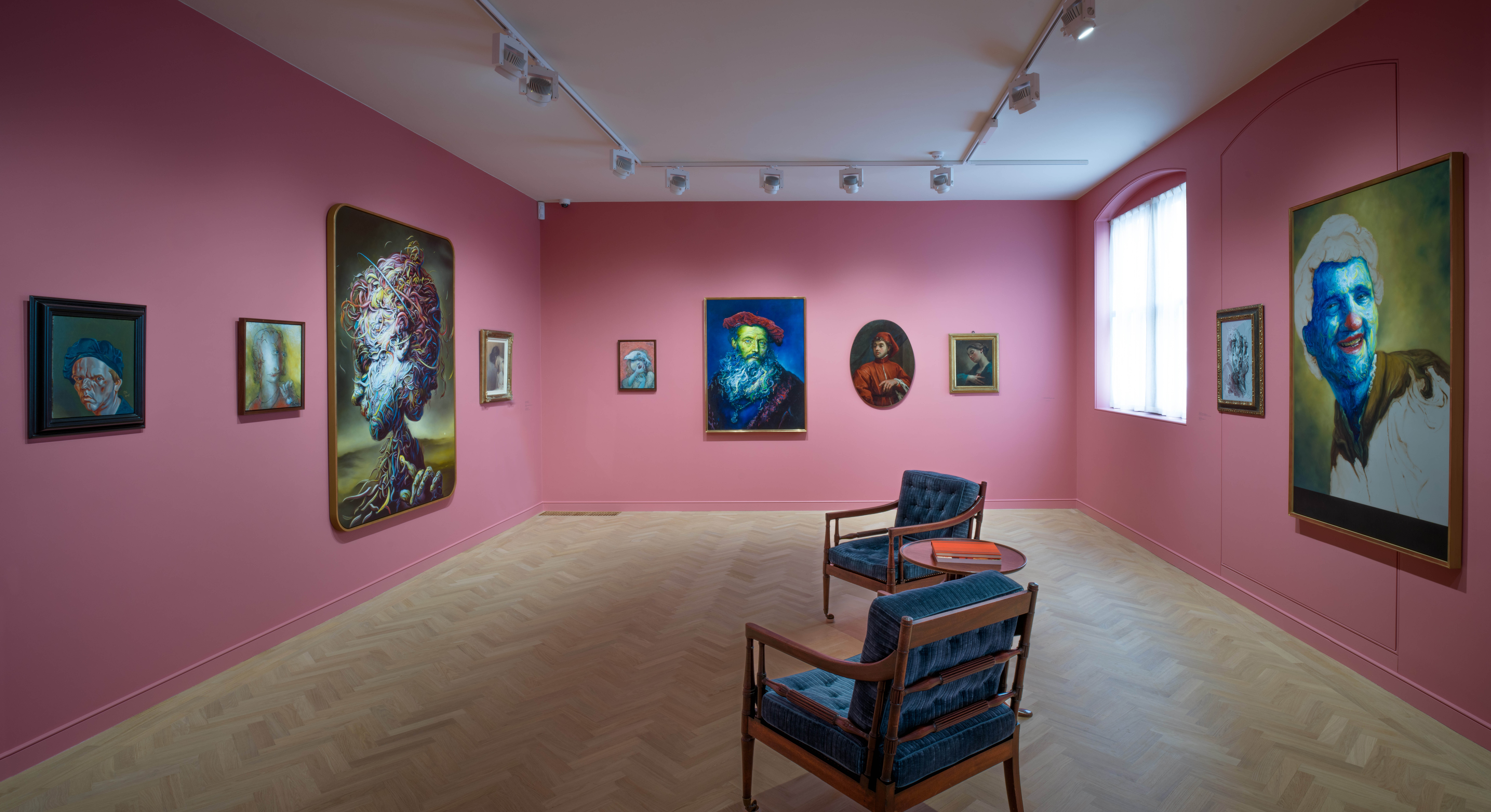
Gallery 3

The five floors are:

- Basement with a vaulted ceiling, with two separate spaces. The first, which houses sculptures, is open to the public. The second, the archive, is a resource for Brown and academics studying his work.
- Ground floor entrance and exhibition space, with natural light from windows, painted dark green
- First floor exhibition space, painted bright pink, with some windows blocked, some left open
- Second floor exhibition space, painted deep grey-blue, with some windows blocked, some left open
- Third floor private offices
