= Abbas Akhavan =

Canadian visual artist

Abbas Akhavan is a Montreal-based visual artist. His recent work consists of site-specific installations, sculpture, video, and performance, consistently in response to the environment in which the work is created. Akhavan was born in Tehran, Iran in 1977. He received his Bachelor of Fine Arts from Concordia University in 2004 and his Master of Fine Arts from the University of British Columbia in 2006. Akhavan's family immigrated to Canada from Iran during the Iran-Iraq war. His work has gained international acclaim, exhibiting in museums, galleries and biennales all over North America, Europe and the Middle East. He is the recipient of the Kunstpreis Berlin (2012), the Abraaj Group Art Prize (2014), and the Sobey Art Award (2015).

== Career ==
Domestic spaces, as negotiated between hospitality and hostility, have been an ongoing area of research in Akhavan's practice. His works are created in direct response to the situation he finds himself working in, whether that might be a specific structure, institution, geographic region, or community. His recent work has moved past the confines of home to the surrounding areas, including an examination of domesticated landscapes. Akhavan has exhibited work at the Western Front in Vancouver, the Delfina Foundation in London, the Bergen Museum in Norway, and ABC Art Berlin Contemporary. Kathleen Ritter writes about his site-specific audio project Landscape: for the birds at the Vancouver Art Gallery in 2009: "an extension of Akhavan's previous projects, where he has, for example, placed a pile of shoes at the foot of a gallery's door, hung a white sheet from a gallery's window, planted a live wall of hedges inside a gallery and blocked off a gallery's entrance with a wall of sandbags resembling a military blockade. The installations reinterpret the gallery entrance as a site of special significance, drawing attention to the threshold between expected and unexpected sites of cultural activity." "Akhavan's art is a thoughtful, and at times mournful, interrogation of our habits of perception, underscoring the provisional nature of our understanding of the world around us."

=== Awards and honours ===
Akhavan was awarded the Kunstpreis Berlin in 2012 and the Abraaj Group Art Prize in 2014. In 2015, Akhavan won the $50,000 Sobey Art Award, given to an artist under 40 whose work has been displayed in a public or commercial art gallery. The Sobey Art Award's six-member curatorial panel said in a statement that they "wanted to underline the generosity and empathy at play in Abbas's work", and that "through a fugitive practice that resists fixed meaning, Akhavan reasserts that power and engagement are always relevant subjects for examination."

=== Residencies ===
- Foundation Marcelino Botin with Mona Hatoum (Spain),
- Le Printemps de Septembre (France)
- Trinity Square Video (Canada)
- Western Front, and Fogo Islands (Canada) (2019, 2016, 2013)
- The Watermill Center (USA)
- The Delfina Foundation (Dubai, UAE & London, UK)

=== Exhibitions ===
- Entre chien et loup, Canada Pavilion, 61st Venice Biennale, Venice, Italy (2026)
- Variations on a Garden, Walker Art Gallery, Minneapolis, USA (2026)
- One Hundred Years, Morris and Helen Belkin Art Gallery, Vancouver, Canada (2025)
- Survival in the 21st Century, Hall of Contemporary Art, Deichtorhallen Hamburg, Germany (2024)
- Curtain Call, variations on a folly, Copenhagen Contemporary, Copenhagen, Denmark (2023)
- cast for a folly, Contemporary Art Gallery, Vancouver (2022)
- study for a garden, Mount Stewart, Scotland (2022)
- Variations on a Folly, Chisenhale Gallery, London (2021)
- cast for a folly, CCA Wattis Institute (2019)
- Variations on a Landscape, Power Plant Gallery (2018)
- Variations on a Garden, Mercer Union, Toronto (2015)
- Burning down the house, Gwangju Biennale, Gwangju (2014)
- Variations on a Garden, Galerie Mana, Istanbul (2013)
- Study for a Glasshouse, Peel Art Gallery, Museum and Archives (2013)
- Turkey Green House, Western Front, Vancouver (2013)
- Study for a Garden, Delfina Foundation, London (2012)
- Material Information, Bergen Museum, Bergen, Norway (2012)
- Tactics for Here & Now, Bucharest Biennale, Bucharest (2012)
- Tools for Conviviality, Power Plant, Toronto (2012)
- Beacon, Darling Foundry, Montreal (2012)
- Phantomhead, Performa 11, New York (2011)
- Seeing is Believing, KW Institute for Contemporary Art, Berlin (2011).
- About painting, ABC Art Berlin Contemporary, Berlin (2011).
