= Glenn Brown (artist) =

British artist

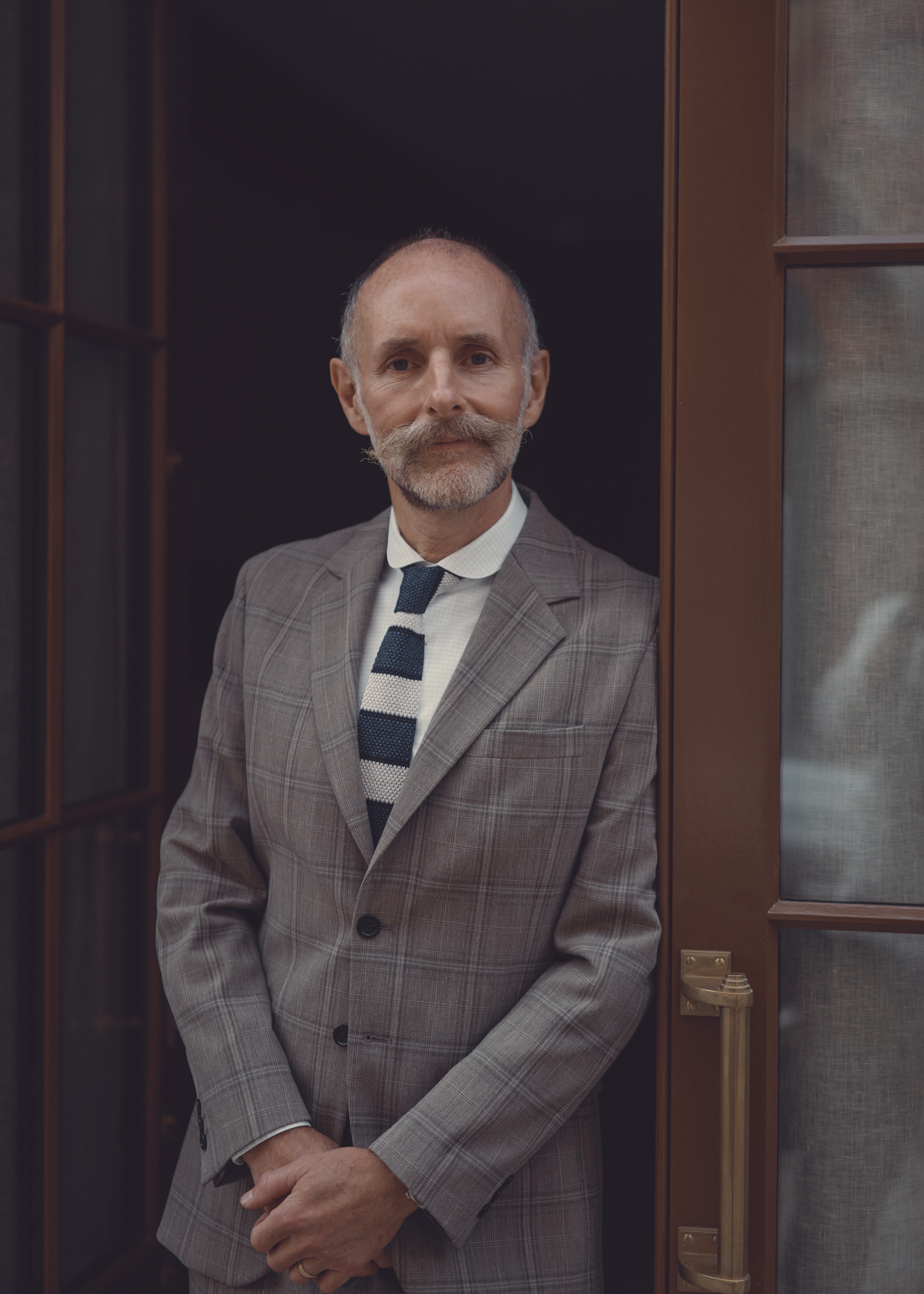
- Brown in 2022
- Born: Glenn Emerson Keith Brown; 13 February 1966 (age 60); Hexham, Northumberland
- Education: Norwich School of Art, Bath College of Higher Education, Goldsmiths College
- Known for: Painting, drawing, sculpture
- Style: Appropriation (art)
- Movement: Young British Artists
- Spouse: Edgar Laguinia
- Awards: CBE
- Website: www.glenn-brown.co.uk

Glenn Brown CBE (born 1966) is a British contemporary artist known for the use of appropriation in his paintings. Starting with reproductions from other artists' works, Glenn Brown transforms the appropriated image by changing its colour, position, orientation, height and width relationship, mood and/or size. Despite these changes, he has occasionally been accused of plagiarism.

He has had a number of solo exhibitions: at the Serpentine Gallery in London in 2004, at the Kunsthistorisches Museum in Vienna in 2008, at Tate Liverpool in 2009 (later shown at the Fondazione Sandretto Re Rebaudengo in Turin), at the Ludwig Múzeum in Budapest in 2010, at the Fondation Vincent Van Gogh in Arles, in Provence, in 2016 and at the Landesmuseum and Sprengel Museum in Hanover in 2023.

Brown currently resides and works in London and Suffolk, England. He was nominated for the Turner Prize in 2000. However, his exhibition at Tate Britain for the Turner Prize sparked some controversy, as one of his paintings was found to be closely based on the science-fiction illustration "Double Star" created by the artist Tony Roberts in 1973.

He was appointed Commander of the Order of the British Empire (CBE) in the 2019 Birthday Honours for services to art.

Brown opened his own museum in October 2022 named The Brown Collection in Marylebone, London.

== Education ==
Brown was born in Hexham, Northumberland. He completed his Foundation Course at Norwich School of Art & Design (1985) and later received a B.A. degree in Fine Art at Bath School of Art and Design (1985–1988) and an M.A. degree at Goldsmiths College (1990–1992).

== Technique and style ==
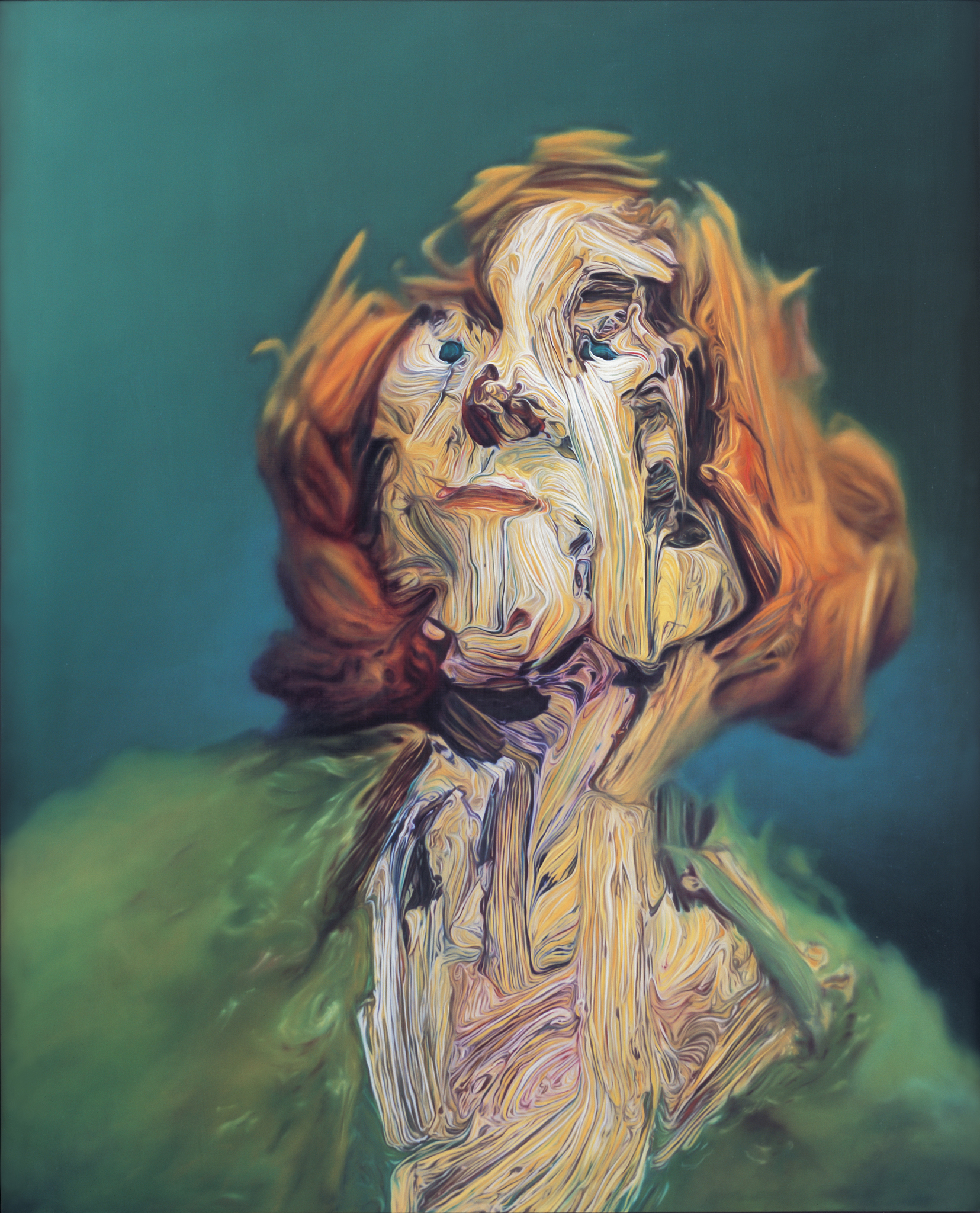
'The Real Thing' (2000) Oil on panel, 82 x 66.5 cm

Brown appropriates images by living, working artists, such as Frank Auerbach and Georg Baselitz, as well as paintings by historical artists, such as Guido Reni, Diego Velázquez, Anthony van Dyck, Rembrandt, Jean-Honoré Fragonard, Eugène Delacroix, John Martin, Gustave Courbet, Adolph Menzel, Pierre-Auguste Renoir, Vincent van Gogh, Chaïm Soutine and Salvador Dalí. He claims that the references to these artists are not direct quotations, but alterations and combinations of several works by different artists, although the artists whose work is appropriated do not always agree. Art critic Michael Bracewell said Brown is "less concerned with the art-historical status of those works he appropriates than with their ability to serve his purpose – namely his epic exploration of paint and painting." In most cases, the artist uses reproductions printed in exhibition catalogues, found on the internet, or ordered through print-on-demand companies.

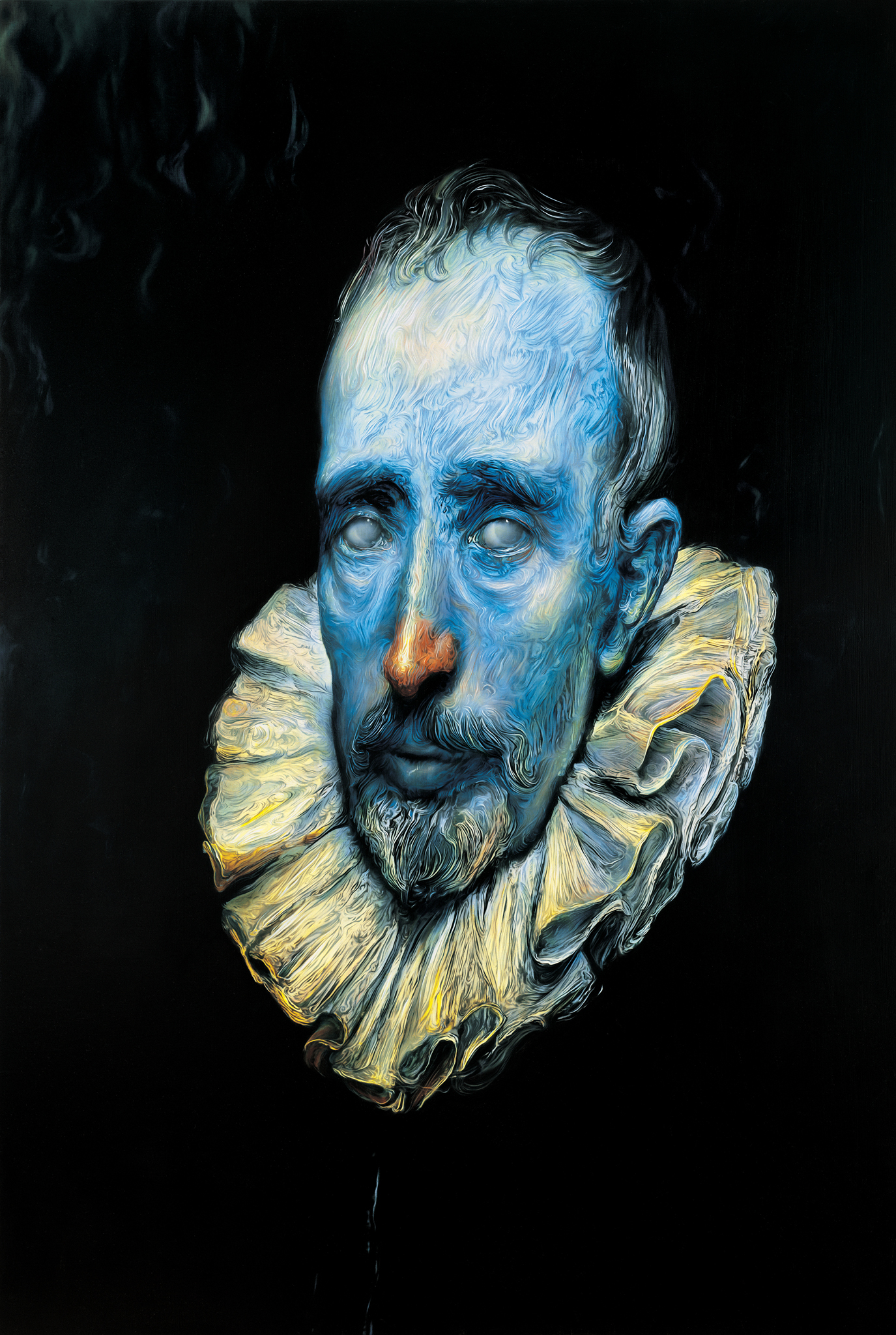
'Sex' (2003) Oil on panel, 126 x 85 cm

Brown's paintings, which are uniformly smooth in surface, typically offer a trompe-l'œil illusion of turbulent, painterly application. Many viewers of his work have expressed the sensation of wanting to "lick" and "touch" the paintings. Brown uses thin brushes with which he produces elongated curls and twists. The resulting flatness of the painting alludes to its origin as the chosen photograph or digital image. Per the artist Michael Stubbs: "Brown‘s computer-based preparation method prior to painting is [not] the sole reason for his relation with the digital. The computer increases and develops his choices of found imagery, but it is only a means, not the end. […]. On the contrary, his works are markers for the future of painting because they are both surface effect and material methodology, not despite the screen, but because of it."

Several of Brown's titles refer to popular music recordings, such as Public Image Ltd's "Death Disco" (1979), Orchestral Manoeuvres in the Dark's Architecture & Morality (1981), and Cocteau Twins' "Alas Dies Laughing" (1982). He has also invoked film titles, and the names of other artists. The titles are not obviously connected to the paintings themselves and are not meant to be descriptive of the artwork. Brown: "That's it – the titles are often trying to be embarrassingly direct, and vulgar in their directness. I don't think that the painting is less direct, but I don't want the paintings to be illustrative."

== Paintings ==
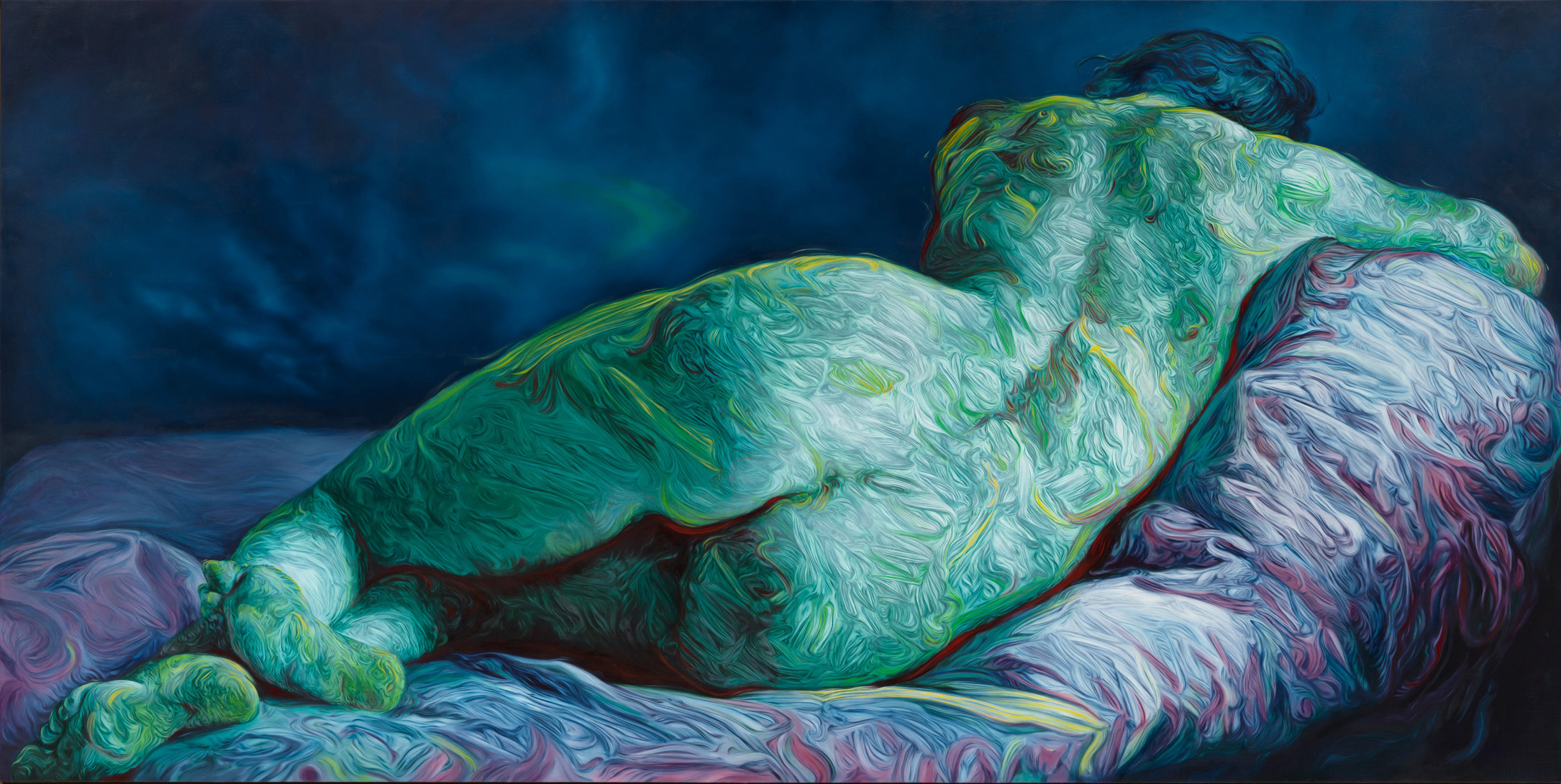
'On the Way to the Leisure Centre' (2017) Oil on panel, 122 x 244 cm

The subject matters of Glenn Brown's paintings range from science-fiction landscapes to abstract compositions and figurative images based on art historical references. Most paintings share a morbid, almost creepy atmosphere, which is especially underlined by the incorporation of certain unsightly physical features of his figures such as yellowish decaying teeth, translucently white blind-looking eyeballs, unnatural skin colours and suggestions of foulness and smell emanating from figures' bodies. Brown: "I like my paintings to have one foot in the grave, as it were, and to be not quite of this world. I would like them to exist in a dream world, which I think of as being the place that they occupy, a world that is made up of the accumulation of images that we have stored in our subconscious, and that coagulate and mutate when we sleep."

Many of Brown's portraits depict amorphous beings that have been described as "tumurous lumps that look like outsized, inflamed organs". Often they are ironically attributed with recurring features such as flowers growing out of their compost-like bodies, hallows placed over heads or red noses. In few of these amorphous and abstract forms, female figures are embedded within the mottling masses of unidentifiable matter.

== Sculptures ==
Brown also places sculpture as a central point of his practice. They are created by accumulating thick layers of oil paint over structures or "often a found bronze sculpture, such as an equestrian figure or the human figure. Brown uses one large brush throughout the making of the sculpture. He paints shadows on the works to give them a light and dark side."

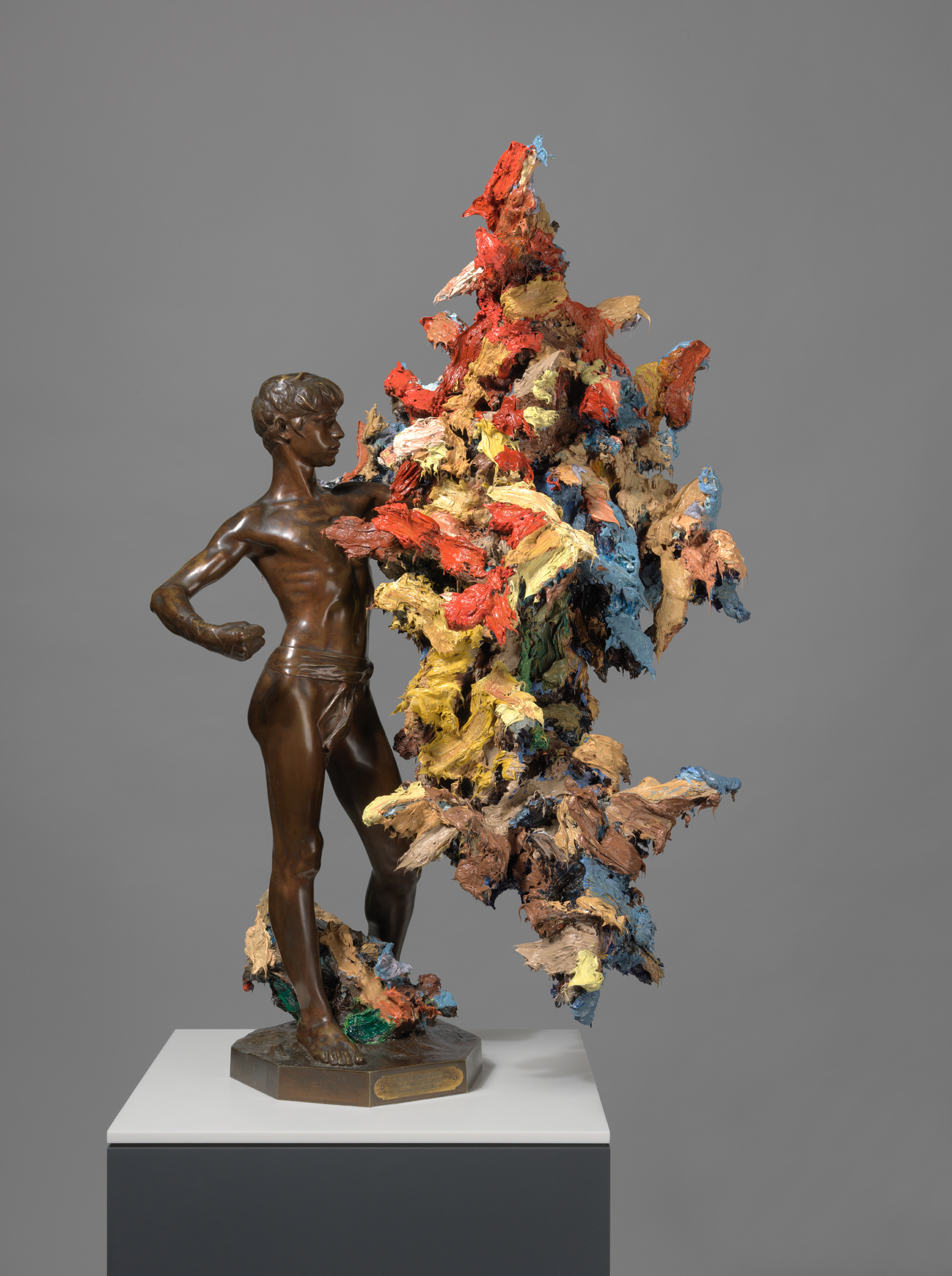
'American Sublime' (2017) Oil and acrylic paint on bronze, 98.5 x 62 x 60 cm

His sculptures, deliberately emphasising the three-dimensional quality of oil brushstrokes, stand in stark contrast to his flat paintings. Brown: "Originally I presented the sculptures on the gallery floor to look as abject as possible, as if they had materialised from a painting and fallen to the ground. Also, I wanted to avoid the artificial context involved in putting them on a pedestal. To view them, you had to bend or crouch down, lowering yourself to their somewhat debased position. But they were just getting destroyed, so they had to be separated from the public by putting them in vitrines. As a result, I was able to make them more delicate, and at the same time I started to use more complex supporting structures inside them. It is these supports that allow the sculptures to tilt and lean as much as they do."

== Etchings ==
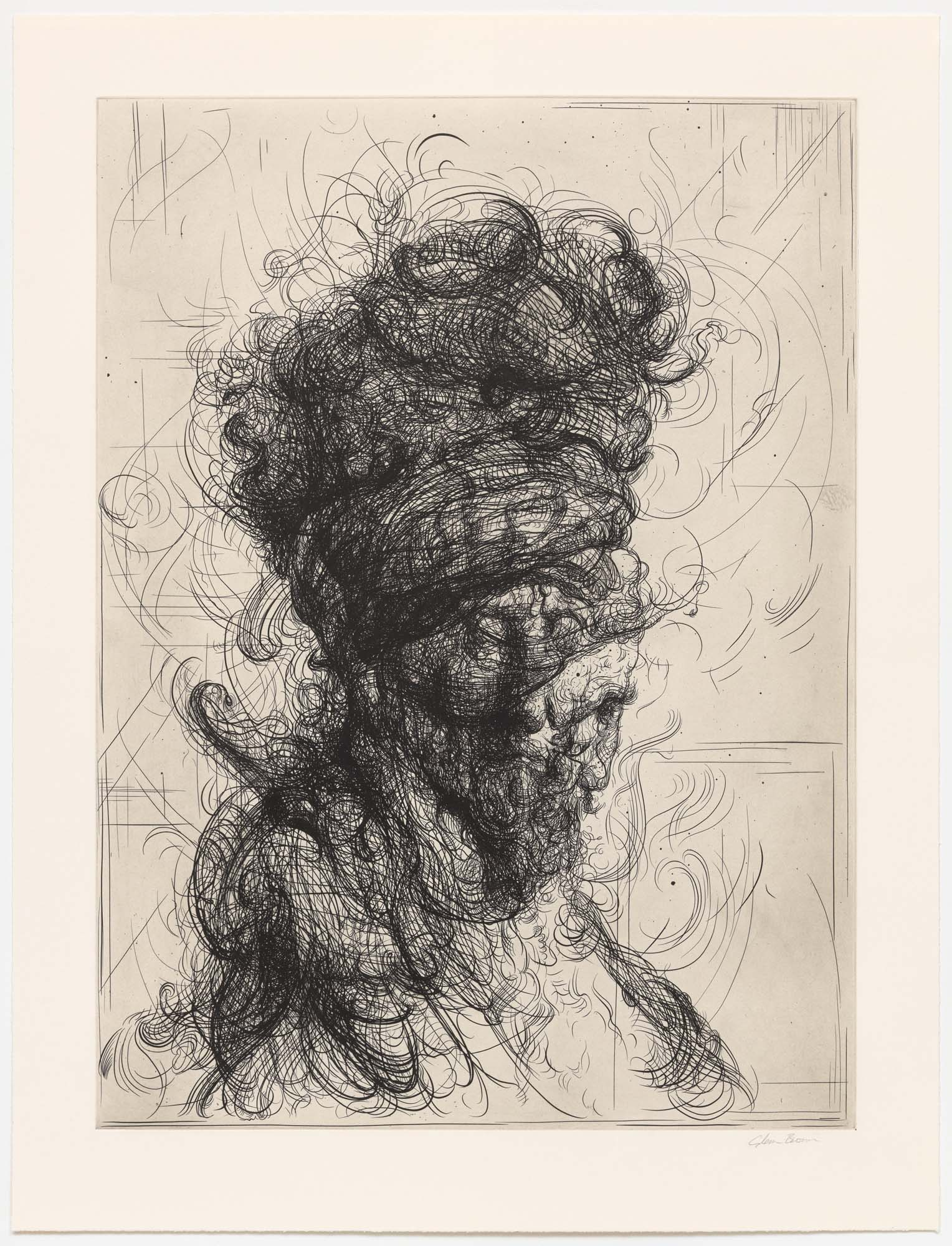
'Half-Life (after Rembrandt) 1' (2016) Etching on paper, 76 x 56 cm

In 2008 Brown created a series of prints entitled "Layered Etchings (Portraits)" which were inspired by the artists Urs Graf, Rembrandt and Lucian Freud. Brown scanned a vast number of reproductions from books and digitally manipulated them by stretching them to standard sizes. He then layered selected scans over each other, resulting in single images. The many contour and incarnation lines of the original works (the artist used up to fifteen different image sources for one layered portrait), as well as the textured spots of lithographic printing, obscure the sitters' individual identities. The resulting half-length portraits are "de-individualised" by the deliberate accumulation of too many portraits over each other.

The etchings were collated in Glenn Brown: Etchings (Portraits), published by Ridinghouse in 2009 which featured a specially commissioned text by John-Paul Stonard that discusses elements of the old and the new in the portraits as they embody concepts of destruction and the violence of appropriation.

== Drawings ==
In the last few years, Brown has extensively embraced drawing. Still conceptually rooted to art historical references, he stretches, combines, distorts and layers images to create subtle yet complex line-based works. Brown: "I fell completely in love with drawing again about four years ago. I love the delicate intimate movement of the hand as it draws a line. With Goltzius, for instance, you get this thrill of delicacy. Drawing has a freshness and passion painting often doesn’t".

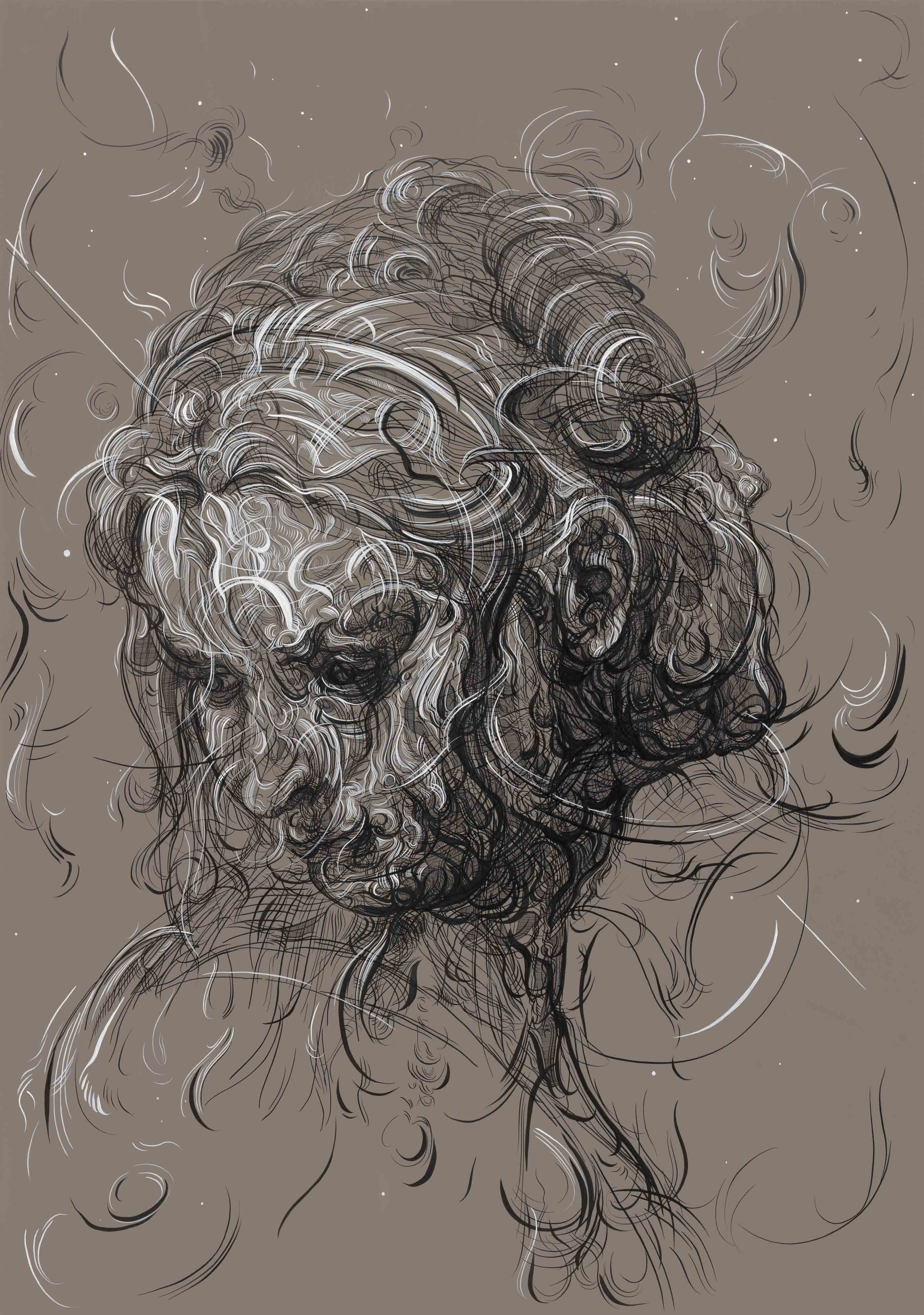
'The Music of the Mountains' (2016) Indian ink and acrylic on panel, 135 x 95 × 3 cm

"In drawings produced since 2013, artists of the Renaissance (such as Andrea del Sarto), Mannerism (Bartholomäus Spranger), the Baroque (Peter Paul Rubens), the Rococo (Giovanni Battista Tiepolo), Neoclassicism (Pompeo Girolamo Batoni) and French Romanticism (Eugène Delacroix) have served as starting points for Brown’s eminently variable linear transformations."

== Controversy ==
In 2000 Brown was accused of plagiarism by The Times. Glenn Brown referenced a work by Tony Roberts for a science fiction novel cover. A legal case brought by Roberts against Brown was settled out of court.

== Public collections ==
Albright-Knox Art Gallery, New York

Art Institute of Chicago, Chicago

Arts Council Collection, London

British Museum, London

Delfina Foundation, London

Fitzwilliam Museum, Cambridge

Fondazione Sandretto Re Rebaudengo, Turin

FRAC – Limousin, Limoges

Francois Pinault Foundation, Venice

Musée National d'Art Moderne, Centre Georges Pompidou, Paris

Museum of Fine Arts Houston, Houston

National Gallery of Victoria, Melbourne

Rembrandtshuis, Amsterdam

Rennie Collection, Vancouver

Tate, London

The Laing Art Gallery, Newcastle

The Museum of Modern Art, New York

The New Art Gallery, Walsall

Walker Art Center, Minneapolis

V-A-C Collection, Moscow

Zabludowicz Collection, London

== The Brown Collection ==
Opened to the public in October 2022, The Brown Collection displays Brown's personal collection, combining his work and work by other artists. The renovated 1905 mews warehouse has four floors of exhibition space, an archive and offices. The museum is open Wednesday to Saturday, between 10.30 am and 6 pm with no admission fee.

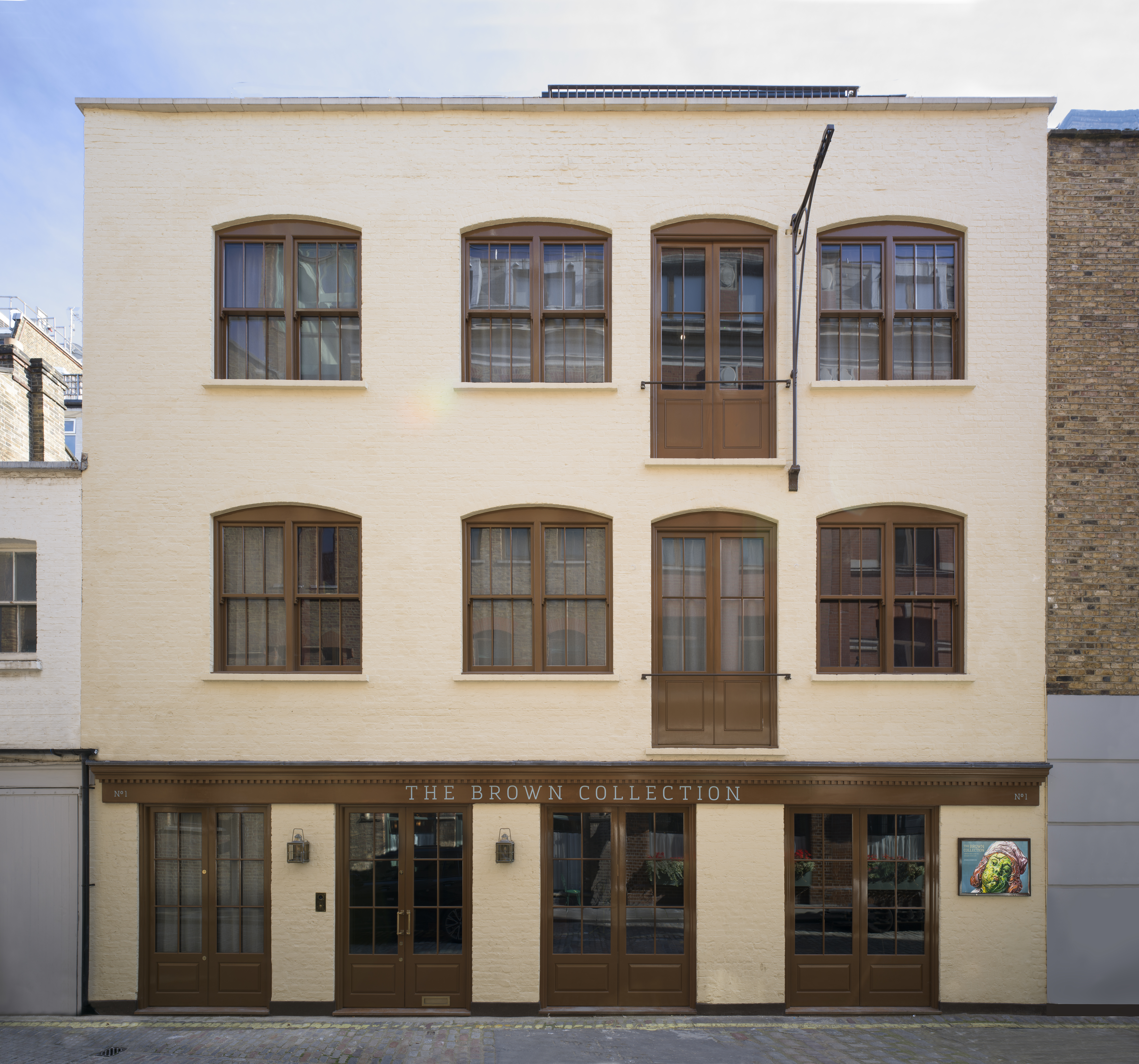
The Brown Collection, Marylebone, London

The museum answers Brown's long-held desire for a permanent place in London to show his collection. Viewing The Brown Collection like a work of art, he says, 'I'm concerned about it being something that I can play with, use as a mode of expression for myself. It's a place to experiment'. The collection includes both Brown's own work and his extensive collection of works by other artists, predominantly of Old Masters, but also of 20th and 21st century artists. Among them are Gillian Wearing, Abraham Bloemaert, Henri Fantin-Latour, Grace Pailthorpe, Hans Hartung, Austin Osman Spare and Gaetano Gandolfi.
