= Simon Bill =

British artist

Simon Bill (born 1958, Kingston-upon-Thames) is a contemporary English visual artist who lives and works in London. He studied art at Saint Martin's School of Art in London from 1977 to 1980 and at The Royal College of Art, also in London, from 1982 to 1985.

== Working practice ==
Bill has almost exclusively exhibited oval paintings on plywood or MDF board, each measuring 127 cm / 97 cm / 5 cm. The subjects of his work are as varied as the materials he uses to create them, which include oil, acrylic, spray, day-glo, blackboard, and glass paints, as well as parcel string, gaffer tape, silicon, permanent markers, various types of foam, emulsion, corn, PVA, foil, fabric swatches, wood stains, hair, yacht varnish, modeling paste, drilled holes, fake gems, polystyrene, and wool.

== Exhibitions ==
Solo exhibitions include The Loved One (2008) at Patrick Painter Inc. in Santa Monica, California, Odd (2007) at Figge von Rosen Galerie, Cologne, Germany, Oooh! (2006) at Stuart Shave/Modern Art in London, OOO! (oval paintings) (2006) at Outpost Gallery, in Norwich, and Three Painters: Simon Bill (2002) at The Cornerhouse in Manchester.
