= Eyal Weizman =

British Israeli architect

Eyal Weizman MBE FBA
- אייל ויצמן
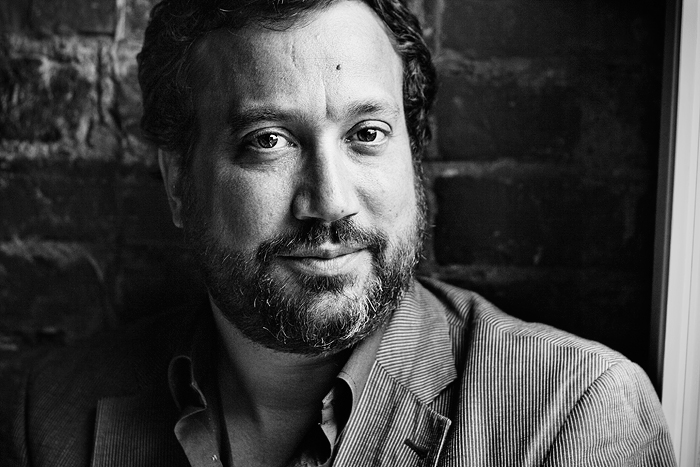
- Weizman in 2012
- Born: Eyal Weizman; 1970 (age 55–56); Haifa, Israel
- Citizenship: Israel; United Kingdom
- Education: Architectural Association School of Architecture (B.Arch, 1998); London Consortium (PhD, 2006)
- Occupation: Architect
- Practice: Forensic Architecture; Decolonizing Architecture Art Residency

Eyal Weizman, MBE, FBA (Hebrew: אייל ויצמן; born 1970) is a British Israeli architect. He is director of the research agency Forensic Architecture, at Goldsmiths, University of London, where he is Professor of Spatial and Visual Cultures and founding director of the Centre for Research Architecture at the department of Visual Cultures.

In 2019 he was elected Fellow of the British Academy.

== Biography ==
Eyal Weizman was born in Haifa, Israel. He studied architecture at the Architectural Association in London, and completed his PhD at the London Consortium.

== Architecture career ==
In 2007 he was a founding member of the architectural collective Decolonizing Architecture (DAAR) in Beit Sahour in the West Bank Palestinian territories. Weizman has been a professor of architecture at the Academy of Fine Arts in Vienna and has also taught at The Bartlett (UCL) in London and at the Städelschule in Frankfurt. He has lectured, curated, and organized conferences in many institutions worldwide. Weizman's most known theoretical work describes the acts of the Israeli army, based on readings of post-structuralist French philosophers. He has also conducted research on behalf of B'tselem on the "planning aspects of the Israeli occupation of the West Bank". He has also published many articles on Israeli geography and architecture. In 2013 he designed a permanent folly in Gwangju, South Korea, which was documented in the book The Roundabout Revolution (Sternberg, 2015).

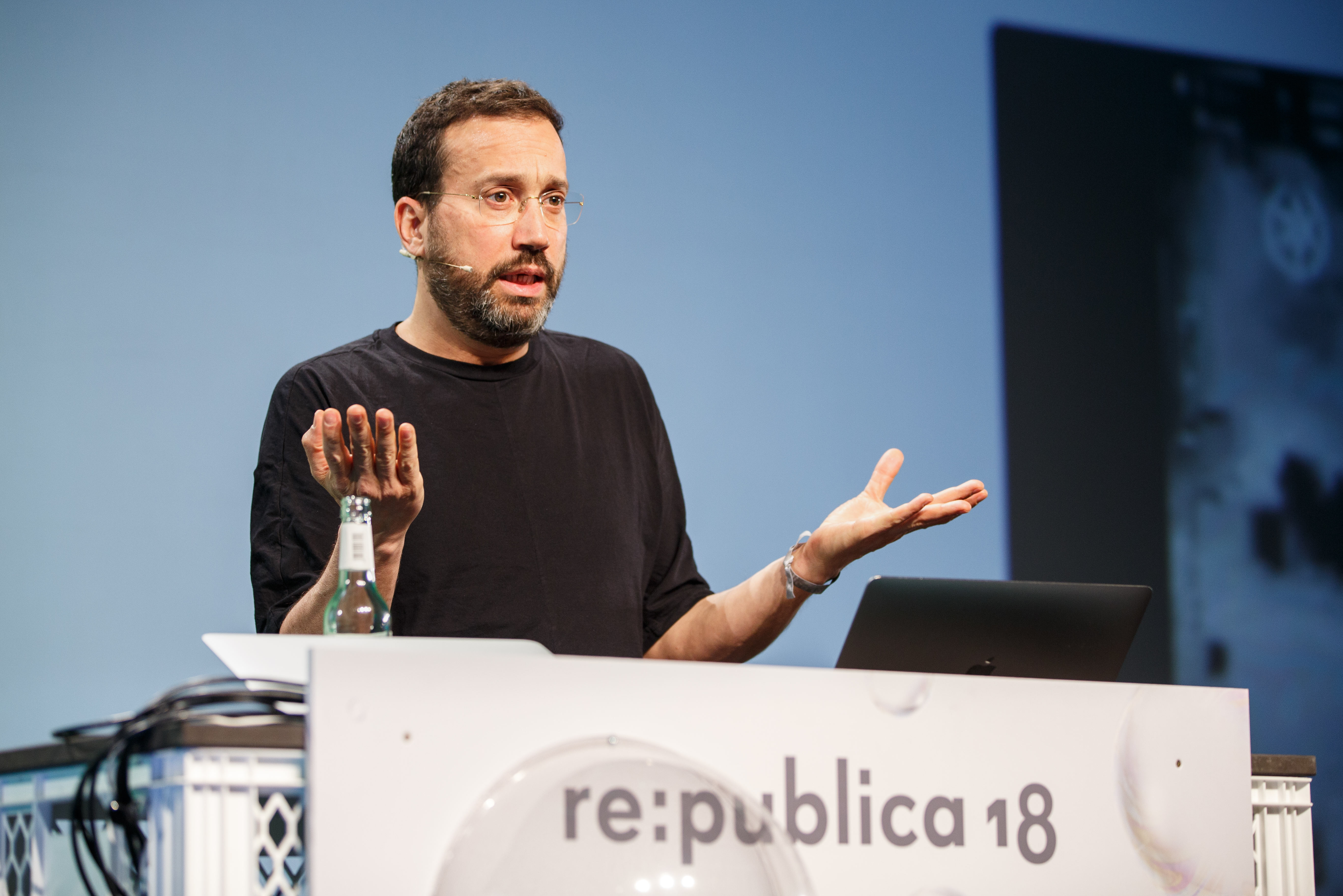
Weizman speaking at the re:publica in Berlin in 2018

In 2010 he established the agency Forensic Architecture, which provide advanced architectural and media evidence to civil society groups, with the help of several European Research Council grants, as well as other human rights grants.

In 2017, he was a guest speaker at the 17th edition of the Sonic Acts Festival: The Noise of Being (Amsterdam). Since 2019 he is a guest professor at ETH Zurich. Between 2014 and 2017 he was a Global Scholar at Princeton University.

In February 2020, Weizman was informed by email that his right to travel to the United States under a visa waiver program had been revoked. He was later informed by an official of the US Embassy in London that an algorithm had identified a security threat that was related to him.

== Political activism ==
Weizman is on the editorial board of Third Text, Humanity, Cabinet and Political Concepts and is a board member of the Centre for Investigative Journalism (CIJ) and of the Technology Advisory Board of the International Criminal Court in the Hague, and sat on the board of the Israeli human rights organization B'Tselem in Jerusalem.

He is currently on the advisory boards of the Human Rights Project at Bard College in New York, as a jury member for architecture in the Akademie Schloss Solitude and of other academic and cultural institutions. In 2014 Weizman was featured in "The Architecture of Violence", a film produced for the series Rebel Architecture broadcast by Al Jazeera English.

Weizman has spoken against Israel's treatment of Palestinians. Speaking about the Israeli military targeting of civilians, Weizman said he "can't see it anything other than a part of the genocidal campaign". Work done by Weizman, as part of Forensic Architecture, challenged Israel's defense in South Africa's genocide case against Israel. Summarizing the report's findings, Weizman said, "Israel's defence at the ICJ relied greatly on it instituting these humanitarian zones, warnings and evacuation orders. And with this, they were trying to argue that actually they are trying to save lives, rather than, as accused, engaging in genocidal acts."

Weizman has criticized Germany's legal and political framework which criminalizes certain forms of solidarity with Palestine by equating it with antisemitism. Weizman argues that this state-sponsored repression undermines democratic values and restricts the ability to challenge oppressive political systems. He also criticized the German state by arguing that the state imposes a narrow, politicized definition of Jewish identity to serve its own political interests.

Weizman's stance on the war in Gaza has produced a great deal of controversy. In a very critical review by Andrew Fox, a retired British officer who was a lecturer at Sandhurst, Weizman's latest book, Ungrounding, was described as "a prosecution exhibit masquerading as forensic scholarship... [and] the most tendentious and disingenuous piece of supposed scholarship you will ever have the misfortune of reading... Its authority depends on the defense never being heard.”

== Awards and recognition ==
Weizman was appointed Member of the Order of the British Empire (MBE) in the 2020 New Year Honours for services to architecture.

- 2006 James Stirling Memorial Lecture Prize from the LSE/London and CCA/Montreal
- 2011 Prince Claus Architecture Prize (co-recipient with DAAR)
- 2016 Schelling Award for Architectural Theory (refused due to Schelling Nazi history)
- 2016 The Digital Dozen 2016 Award for Breakthroughs in Storytelling from Columbia University
- 2018 nominated for the Turner Prize with Forensic Architecture
- 2019 elected Fellow of the British Academy
- 2020 MBE for services to architecture
- 2021 received the London Design Innovation Medal

== Books ==
- 1998 (with Christian Nicolas) Random Walk, London: Architectural Association
- 2000 Yellow Rhythms, Rotterdam: 010 Publishers
- 2003 (with Rafi Segal) Civilian Occupation: The Politics of Israeli Architecture, Verso
- 2003 (with Anselm Franke) Territories, Builders and Warrior, Rotterdam: Witte de With Press
- 2003 (with Anselm Franke) Territories, Camps, Islands and other States of Utopia, Berlin and Cologne: Kunst Werke and Walter Koenig Press
- 2004 (with Anselm Franke) Territories, The Frontiers of Utopia and other Facts on the Ground, Cologne: Walther Koenig Press
- 2007 Hollow Land: Israel's Architecture of Occupation, Verso
- 2011 The Least of All Possible Evils: Humanitarian Violence from Arendt to Gaza, Verso
- 2012 (with Thomas Keenan) Mengele's Skull: The Advent of Forensic Aesthetics, Sternberg Press/Portikus
- 2013 (with Ines Weizman) Before and After, Moscow: Strelka Press
- 2014 (with Alessandro Petti and Sandi Hilal) Architecture After Revolution, Berlin: Sternberg Press
- 2014 (with Forensic Architecture) FORENSIS, Berlin: Sternberg Press
- 2015 The Roundabout Revolution, Berlin: Sternberg Press
- 2015 (with photography by Fazal Sheikh) The Conflict Shoreline: Colonization as Climate Change in the Negev Desert, Göttingen: Steidl and Cabinet Books. ISBN 978-3-95829-035-8
- 2017 Forensic Architecture: Violence at the Threshold of Detectability, NYC: MIT/Zone Books
- 2021 (with Matthew Fuller) Investigative Aesthetics: Conflicts and Commons in the Politics of Truth, London: Verso
- 2021 The Police Shooting of Mark Duggan: Forensic Architecture Reports, New York: Cabinet books and London: ICA books
- 2026 Ungrounding: The Architecture of Genocide, Vintage Publishing, London
