= Decolonizing Architecture Art Residency =

Architectural studio in Beit Sahour, West Bank

Decolonizing Architecture Art Residency (DAAR) is an architectural studio, collective of architects and a residency program based in Beit Sahour, Palestine. DAAR was established to work on complex architectural problems in a region with strongly conflicting political forces, and is related to the Decolonizing Architecture Art Research collective.

== Description ==
DAAR's work combines spatial interventions, theoretical writings and collective learning. It is dedicated to architectural experimentations on the reuse and transformation of colonial architecture, settlements, military bases, and empty villages, primarily in Palestine. "DAAR’s practice is centred on one of the most difficult dilemmas of political practice: how to act both propositionally and critically within an environment in which the political force field is so dramatically distorted."

== History ==
DAAR was founded in 2007 in Beit Sahour by Alessandro Petti, Sandi Hilal and Eyal Weizman. Its ideas that have been developed and disseminated throughout the region and abroad via exhibitions, seminars, videos and publications. Dozens of local and international architects and a number of Artists, film makers and activists work with DAAR.

== Projects ==
DAAR worked on a project titled Refugee Heritage, that engaged directly with UNESCO to nominate the Dheisheh Refugee Camp in the West Bank to be become a World Heritage Site. The project critically engaged with heritage as a concept.

In 2010 DAAR asked the lawyer Ghiath Nasser to file a petition in the Israeli courts to allow the width of the line partitioning Palestine to be a site for a new 'borderline state'.

== Awards ==
In 2010, the Institute was honoured with a Prince Claus Award. The jury rewards its work

"for introducing a non-traditional approach to development in conflict and post-conflict situations, for providing valuable speculation on the future realities of disputed territories, for its critical challenge to outdated urban planning theories based on a more peaceful world, and for highlighting the role of architecture highlighting the role of architecture and visualisation in creating and altering the frontiers of reality."

DAAR received Foundation for Arts Initiatives (FfAI) grants in 2010, 2012, 2014, and 2015.

DAAR was nominated for the Curry Stone Design Price, the Anni and Heinrich Sussmann Artist Award, the New school's Vera List Center Prize for Art and Politics, and the Chrnikov Prize.

Co-founder, Alessandro Petti, received a 2016 Keith Haring Fellowship in Art and Activism at Bard College.

In 2023, the Venice Biennale of Architecture honoured the Institute with the Golden Lion for the best participant in the 18th Exhibition The Laboratory of the Future.

== Exhibitions ==
DAAR projects have been published and exhibited at the Venice Biennale, Home Works in Beirut, the Istanbul Biennial, the Bozar in Brussels, NGBK in Berlin, Sharjah Biennale, the Architecture Biennale Rotterdam, Architekturforum Tirol in Innsbruck, the Tate in London, the Oslo Triennial, the Pompidou Centre in Paris.

On January 27, 2012, DAAR exhibited at the Nottingham Contemporary Gallery. The exhibition was entitled ‘Common assembly’, and the "focal point of the exhibition is a large suspended staircase, representing a section at 1:1 scale where the lawless line cuts straight through the derelict Palestinian parliament building in Jerusalem" The parliament building is on both Israeli and Palestinian territory, causing the legal status of the building to be unknown. DAAR's 'Common assembly' questions the thickness or a border line and suggests that the line itself is an extraterritorial zone.

== Teaching ==
DAAR's members have taught lectured and published internationally including a term as guest professors at the Berlage Institute, Bir Zeit University, Bard-Al Quds, and Goldsmiths.

Alessandro Petti is currently Professor in Architecture and Social justice at the Royal Institute of Art in Stockholm.

== Book ==
In 2013, DAAR published 'Architecture after Revolution' with the Berlin-based publisher Strenberg Press. According to Strenberg, the authors present a series of provocative projects that try to imagine "the morning after revolution."
