= Olivia Plender =

British artist (born 1977)

Olivia Plender (born 1977) is an artist based in London and Stockholm. She is known for her installations, performances, videos, and comics.

== Life and career ==
Plender was born in London. Her work is often based on historical research and she has made projects about several early 20th century social movements, including the Kindred of the Kibbo Kift, and the East London Federation of the Suffragettes.

== Exhibitions ==
Plender's artworks have been shown internationally in museums, exhibition spaces and as part of biennales, and she also works in the field of public art.

Her exhibitions include:

- 34th Bienal de São Paulo: Though it's dark, still I sing (2021)
- Göteborg International Biennial (2017)
- BAHAR, Off-Site Project for Sharjah Biennial 13, Istanbul (2017)
- El Teatro Del Mundo, Museo Tamayo Arte Contemporáneo, Mexico City (2014)
- British Art Show 7, Hayward Gallery, London & CCA, Glasgow (2011)
- 7th Taipei Biennial (2010)
- Manifesta 8, Murcea (2010)
- Altermodern: Tate Triennial, Tate Britain, London (2009)
- The Greenroom: Reconsidering the Documentary and Contemporary Art, Hessel Museum of Art, CCS Bard, New York (2008)
- BMW: 1X Baltic Triennial of International Art, CAC, Vilnius (2005)
- Romantic Detachment, MoMA PS1, New York (2004)

Plender's art works are in the collections of Tate Gallery and Arts Council England.

== Publishing ==
A book on her work, titled Rise Early, Be Industrious, was published by Sternberg Press in 2016. It followed a solo show with the same title that toured to MK Gallery in Milton Keyes, Arnolfini in Bristol and CCA in Glasgow, UK, in 2012 and 2013.

Plender has published several graphic novels and comic books, including The Masterpiece (2001-2006), about the life of a fictional artist in 1960s London, and A Stellar Key to the Summerland (2007).

Plender was co-editor of Untitled Magazine from 2002 until it closed in 2008.

== Awards ==
In 2006 she won the Paul Hamlyn Award for Visual Arts.
