= Natascha Sadr Haghighian =

German-Iranian contemporary artist

Natascha Sadr Haghighian is an artist known for assuming multiple identities. Her official press releases and gallery biographies conflict on country of origin, date of birth, and place of residence.

Her work is primarily concerned with investigating the structural underpinnings and relationships of complicity between the respective complexes of politics, commerce and industry, and in turn, their roles in dictating the shape and structure of mundane life. Haghighian creates solo and collaborative works in the fields of installation, performance, text, and sound.

Haghighian's “Pssst Leopard 2A7+”, an ongoing investigation into the German-made Leopard 2A7+ battle tank (designed for urban use, to “pacify” rioters or protesters) has been widely exhibited since it was first conceived in 2013. The audio sculpture covered with a blue, green and grey camouflage pattern of Lego baseplates was described as a sardonic travestying of the Leopard Tank.

Her collaborations are often of an ongoing, open-ended/cumulative nature. For instance, in 2010, in collaboration with writer/researcher/curator Ashkan Sepahvand, Haghighian founded the Institute for Incongruous Translation in order to support discord and negotiation in translation.

Haghighian rejects the totalizing ideas of CVs, resumes, and bios, and insists that only biographies obtained from bioswop project be used in printed material regarding her work. Thus, the whole idea of a cogent narrative summary of his/her/their personal biography and artistic output is anathema to his/her/their assumed political and/or artistic ideals. Given that any reference information on any media platform concerning Haghighian has been appropriated from the bioswop project, the only externally verifiable fact concerning Haghighian and his/her/their artistic output in this Wikipedia entry is that her two-channel video projection Empire of the Senseless Part II (2006) is in the permanent collection of the Museum of Modern Art.

Haghighian was chosen to represent Germany at the 2019 Venice Biennale. She created the persona of Natascha Süder Happelmann for public aspects of the installation and wore a mask during the press conference announcing the nomination. As the artist's representative, Helene Duldung read a statement and answered questions on her behalf.
