= Shahira Fahmy =

Egyptian architect

- Born: 1974 (age 51–52); Egypt
- Education: Cairo University; Harvard Graduate School of Design
- Occupation: Architect
- Children: 2
- Awards: International Mimar Sinan Prize, Green GOOD DESIGN Award; Young Architect Award
- Practice: Shahira Fahmy Architects
- Website: www.sfahmy.com

Shahira Fahmy (born 1974) is an Egyptian architect. She is the founder and principal of Shahira Fahmy Architects (SFA), established in 2005 in Cairo, Egypt.

Fahmy won the Loeb Fellowship at the Harvard Graduate School of Design for 2015, and is a recipient of the Berkman fellowship of Berkman Center for Internet & Society for 2016 at Harvard Law School.

Fahmy has also served as an adjunct assistant professor at Columbia Graduate School of Architecture, Planning and Preservation at Columbia University.

In 2005, Fahmy won the Bibliotheca Alexandrina Young Architect Award (2005). Her company has won international competitions in Switzerland and London.

== Early life and education ==
Fahmy was born in Egypt. She graduated with a bachelor's degree in architecture from Cairo University in 1997. She also holds a master's degree in architecture from Cairo University, graduating in 2004.

== Career ==
Fahmy was an instructor at Cairo University from 1997 to 2007.

Fahmy has collaborated with other architects, including working with Legoretta+legorreta, Abdel Halim Ibrahim, and Sasaki on the new campus at American University in Cairo in 2005, with Dar el Handasah on the design of the Ahmed Bahaa El-Din Cultural Center in 2010, and with Bas Princen at the exhibition 'Home in the Arab World' at the 2012 London Festival of Architecture.

Fahmy has been a guest speaker at Arkimeet, Istanbul (2010), the Royal Institute of British Architects, London (2011), the Harvard Arab Alumni Association (2011), American University Beirut (2012), and American University Cairo (2012).

In 2012, with the London-based Delfina Foundation, Fahmy won an architecture competition and as a result worked on the architectural expansion of the Delfina Foundation headquarters near Buckingham Palace in London, which was completed in 2014. Fahmy also designed the modern Block 36 in Westown, Cairo.

Fahmy is a board member of the International Community of the Red Cross in Egypt. She is a member of the Egyptian Engineering Syndicate and the Friends of Ahmed Bahaa El Din Society. She is an associate member of the Society of Egyptian Architects, UIA National Section, and the Egyptian Earth Construction Association.

Fahmy has participated in various architectural exhibitions, including the Atlas of The Unbuilt World, The Home in the Arab world, Andermatt Swiss Alps AG, Green Good Design Exhibition, Cityscape Abu Dhabi, +20 Egypt Design, Cairo, Egypt, World Architecture Festival, Cityscape Dubai, MIPIM, Traffic, Furnex, LEAF Award, 100% Design/ 100% Futures, Salone Internationale del Mobile Salone Satellite, and Bibliotheca Alexandrina.

=== Acting ===
Fahmy made her acting debut in Hong Sang-soo's 2017 drama film Claire's Camera, alongside Isabelle Huppert and Kim Min-hee. The feature was screened in the Special Screening section at the 2017 Cannes Film Festival.

== Publications: Books ==
- BARS! Architectural Hightech Bars & Clubs, Monsa Publications, Spain, 2012.
- Atlas Architectures of the 21st Century - Africa and Middle East, edited by Luis Fernández-Galiano, fundacion BBVA, Spain 2011.
- Winning Shopping Center Designs 35th Edition ICSC VIVA Awards, International Council of Shopping Centers council, 2011.
- Top 50 Beautiful Homes, Design Media Publishing Limited, UK, 2011.
- Atlas of World Interior Design, Braun, Germany, 2010.
- Andrew Martin, Interior Design Review, UK – Vol. 14, 2010 .
- Egyptian Homes, Dar El-Shorouk, Egypt, “Summer Fun”,“Modern Opulence”, “Montazah”, “Place in the Sun”, 2010 .
- The Independent Design Guide, Thames & Hudson, UK, Tik & Tak stools"Furniture/Seating", 2009 .
- 30*3 - Andrew Martin International Design Award Book, China, 2008 .
- Interior Design Review, Vol. 9, Andrew Martin, UK, “Shahira Hamed Fahmy” 2007.
