= Sandi Hilal =

Palestinian architect

- Born: 1973 (age 52–53); West Bank, Beit Sahour
- Occupation: Architect

Sandi Hilal (born 1973) is a Palestinian architect, writer, and researcher. Hilal was Head of the Infrastructure and Camp Improvement Program in the West Bank at UNRWA (United Nations Relief and Works Agency for Palestine Refugees in the Near East) from 2008 to 2014.

== Early life and education ==
Hilal was born in Beit Sahour, near Bethlehem. She graduated with a Master's from the Sapienza University of Rome and a PhD from the University of Trieste in Transborder policies for daily life. She was then an assistant professor of Fine Art and Urban Studies at the Università Iuav di Venezia. She has since been a visiting professor at Lund University.

== DAAR - Decolonising Architecture Art Research ==
Based in Palestine, DAAR is a collective working on art and architecture, comprising Sandi Hilal, Alessandro Petti and Eyal Weizman. The collective offers new pedagogical practices for teaching, sharing and assembling. Through processes of talking, treasuring and gathering with memories, they enact re-constructions of living spaces, focusing on diasporic existences and refugee camps. Their work extends thinking on intangible heritage: they widen possibilities for re-establishing presence, by exploring provisionality and permanence in the built environment. They re-imagine, re-design and re-purpose Israeli architecture as de-colonial practice: “speculating about the seemingly impossible, the actual transformation of the structures of domination.”

The Campus in Camps project (2012–2016) created a learning and project space in refugee camps in collaboration with Al Quds University (Al Quds/Bard Partnership) and hosted by the Phoenix Center in Dheisheh Refugee Camp in Bethlehem and with the support of the Popular Committees of Southern West Bank refugee camps.

Shu'fat School (2014) is a girls school built in Shu'fat refugee camp on the outskirts of Jerusalem. created with the goal of making a collaborative space for learning that encourages participants as active agents in their education.

== Architectural Interventions ==
Concrete Tent, Dheisheh (2015) and (2018) is a project that explores the tent's historic role as a mobile or temporary housing structure. It works to make this solid, using concrete to fix the form of the tent as a more permanent structure. It was exhibited at the Sharjah Architecture Biennial in 2023.

== Publications ==
- Stateless Nation (2003) Venice Biennale
- Architecture after Revolution. By Sandi Hilal, Alessandro Petti, Eyal Weizman. Sternberg Press (2013)
- Refugee Heritage. Art & Theory Publishing in collaboration with Royal Institute of Art, Stockholm; Iaspis, the Swedish Arts Grants Committee's International Programme for Visual Artists; Van Abbemuseum; Art Jameel in Dubai, 2021. Published as part of the 17th International Architecture Exhibition, Venice Biennale, 2021.
- Permanent Temporariness. Art &Theory Publishing in collaboration with the Royal Institute of Art, Stockholm, Sweden, 2018.
- Public Memory, Public Art – Reflections on Monuments and Memorial Art Today (2022). Art & Theory Publishing, in collaboration with Public Art Agency Sweden. Anthology edited by Annika Enqvist, Karolina Modig, Rebecka Katz Thor, Joanna Zawieja, asking, "What does it mean to remember through art?".

== Exhibitions and institutional collaborations ==
- Stateless Heritage (2021–22) Mosaic Rooms, London UK.
- Permanent Temporariness (2018) NYUAD Gallery, Abu Dhabi. A retrospective exhibition of the work of Sandi Hilal and Alessandro Petti covering 15 years of their collaborative practice on the theme of refuge and refugees.
- Common Assembly (2012) a project by Sandi Hilal, Alessandro Petti, Eyal Weizman, Nicola Perugini with Yazeed Anani, Nishat Awan, Ghassan Bannoura, Benoit Burquel, Suzy Harris-Brandts, Runa Johannessen, Zografia Karekou, Cressida Kocienski, Lejla Odobasic, Carina Ottino, Elizabeth Paden, Sameena Sitabkhan, Amy Zion exhibited at the James gallery, New York City, USA. It reconstructed a small segment of the never used Palestinian parliament, which was started under the 1996 Oslo accord and halted in 2003 without ever being used.
- Venice Biennale (2003, 2008, 2009, 2013, 2015)
- Istanbul Biennial (2009)
- Home Works Beirut (2010)
- Bienal de São Paulo (2014)
- Asian Art Biennial (2015)
- Marrakesh Biennial (2016)
- Qalandia International (2016)
- Sharjah Biennial 13 (2017)
- Decolonizing Architecture Art Residency: Common Assembly, The Center for the Humanities, James Gallery, New York City, USA (2012) and Nottingham Contemporary, Nottingham, UK (2015). Group project by Sandi Hilal, Alessandro Petti, Eyal Weizman, Nicola Perugini with Yazeed Anani, Nishat Awan, Ghassan Bannoura, Benoit Burquel, Suzy Harris-Brandts, Runa Johannessen, Zografia Karekou, Cressida Kocienski, Lejla Odobasic, Carina Ottino, Elizabeth Paden, Sameena Sitabkhan, Amy Zion.
- Palestine from Above, Qattan Foundation, Ramallah (2021), group show.

== Awards ==
- 2010 Prince Claus Prize for Architecture from the Prince Claus Fund
- 2016 Keith Haring Fellowship in Art and Activism at Bard College
- The New School's Vera List Center Prize for Art and Politics
- The Anni and Heinrich Sussmann Artist Award
- 2011 Art Initiative Grant
- 2023 Venice Biennale of Architecture: Golden Lion for the best participant in The Laboratory of the Future.
