= Adila Laïdi-Hanieh =

Palestinian art historian

- عادلة العايْدي-هَنِيَّة
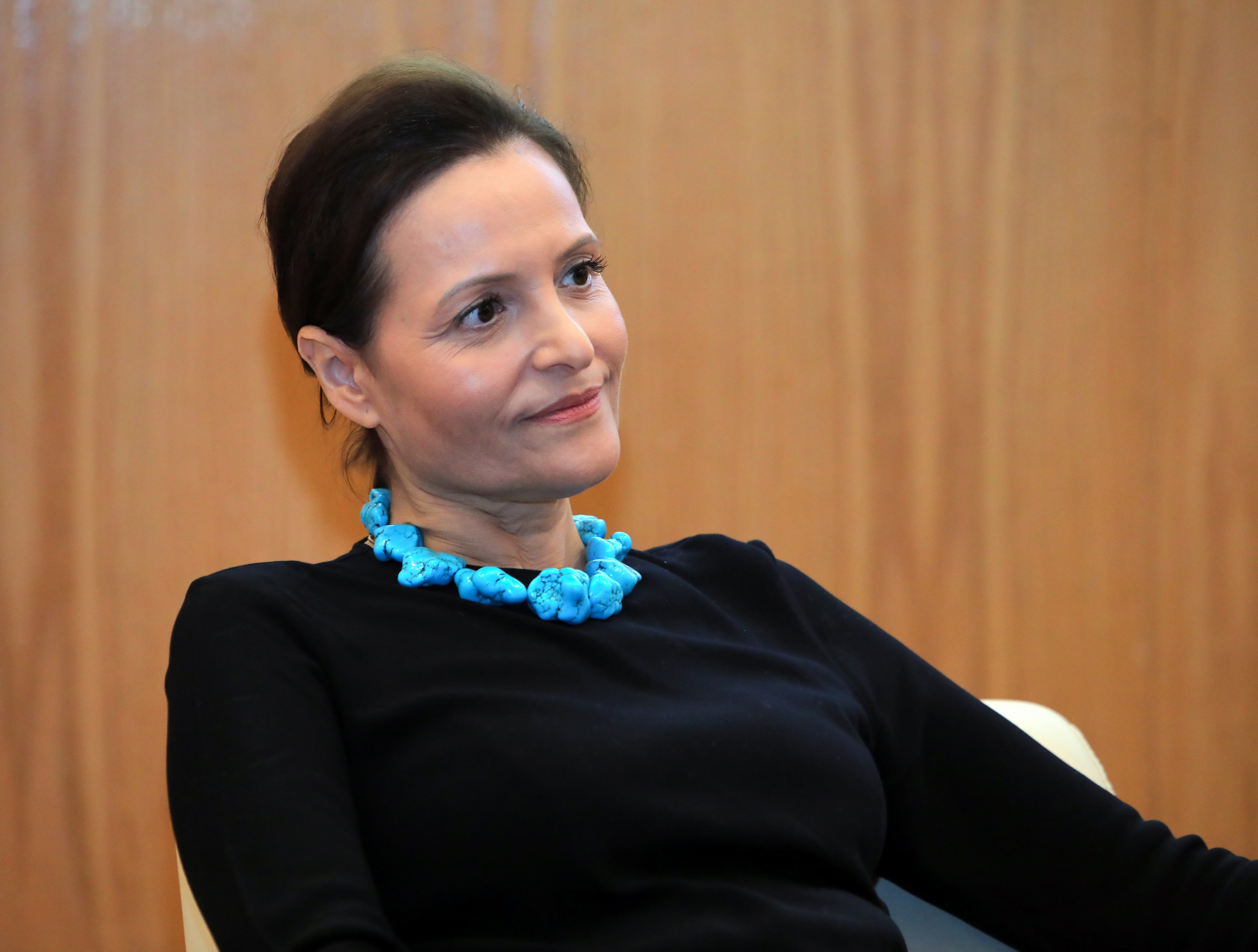
- Born: Algiers
- Education: Georgetown University; George Mason University; Institut d'Etudes Politiques of Paris
- Occupations: Art historian Museum leader
- Known for: Former Director General of The Palestinian Museum
- Notable work: Fahrelnissa Zeid, Painter of Inner Worlds (2017)
- Awards: National Order of Merit (France)

Adila Laïdi-Hanieh (Arabic: عادلة العايْدي-هَنِيَّة) is an Algerian-Palestinian art historian and museum director, who formerly led the Khalil Sakakini Cultural Centre and The Palestinian Museum. She has been awarded the French National Order of Merit.

== Early life and education ==
Born in Algiers, Laïdi-Hanieh is the daughter of Ahmed Laïdi, a senior Algerian civil servant and former ambassador to Spain, Jordan, the United Kingdom, and Mexico. Her mother is Algerian novelist Aïcha Lemsine.

As a teenager in Jordan, she took drawing and painting lessons with artist Fahrelnissa Zeid, and participated in the 1981 "Fahrelnissa and her Institute" exhibition held at Qasr al Thaqafa - Amman, showcasing works by Fahrelnissa Zeid, and the students of her Institute. She subsequently wrote a biography on the painter, which was published in 2017.

Laïdi-Hanieh studied at Georgetown University for her MA and George Mason University for her PhD. She also studied at the Institut d'Etudes Politiques of Paris where she was awarded a Certificat d'Etudes Politiques.

== Career ==
Appointed in 1996, Laïdi-Hanieh was the first director of the Khalil Sakakini Cultural Centre, which she left in 2005. In 1997, she initiated and led its transformation from a governmental center, created by the Palestinian Ministry of Culture in a renovated 1930s vernacular architecture mansion, into a non-governmental organization with a Board and a General assembly. Laïdi-Hanieh focused on the development of the local visual arts scene and transition into conceptual and Contemporary Art by organizing tens of annual individual exhibitions for young artists, including from Gaza, organizing summer academies for young artists, and promoting their work via publishing regular exhibition catalogues. As such, the Sakakini Centre led the first of its kind program of youth outreach. During her tenure, the Sakakini was the main public cultural venue in the West Bank, hosting a regular program of concerts, public talks, publications, film screenings and debates, and launching websites on Palestinian culture. Palestine’s national poet Mahmoud Darwish had an office at the Sakakini during the same period, and gave frequent public events there.

She was also active on the Arab art scene, becoming chairperson of the Artistic Board of the non-governmental pan Arab cultural organization Cultural Resource (Al-Mawred) in 2003, a founding member of the board of the Arab Fund for Arts and Culture (AFAC) in 2007, and a member of the Advisory Board of Darat Al Funun Art Foundation.

From 2006 to 2008 she taught contemporary and art history at Birzeit University. Described in 2009 as a cultural critic in the Jerusalem Quarterly, she has also written on cultural history in Palestine. She appeared at numerous conferences and published numerous essays on Arab culture and Palestinian visual arts, in French, Arabic and English.

In 2006–2008, as a member of the steering Committee of the Palestinian cultural season in the Belgian region of Wallonia "Masarat". She conceptualized and edited the book Palestine. Rien ne nous manque ici, the first multidisciplinary contemporary cultural anthology on Palestine. The book featured original essays by Palestinian, European, Arab, and Japanese novelists, poets, and scholars, as well as art works and photography by Palestinian and European artists such as Mahmoud Darwish, Satoshi Ukai, Francis Mertens, Mona Hatoum, Marc Trivier, Jumana Emil Abboud, Mahmoud Shqeir, Mourid Barghouti, Hany Abu Assad, Jacques Sojcher, Ahlam Shibli, John Berger, Faysal Darraj, and others.

She completed her PhD at George Mason University in 2015, focusing her dissertation and her subsequent postdoctoral fellowship from the Arab Council for the Social Sciences on contemporary Palestinian cultural practices: literature, visual arts, and cinema. Her theoretical approach analyzed the mode of articulation of the political with the aesthetic, within a critical and cross-disciplinary cultural studies approach encompassing Third Cinema, aesthetic regimes, etc. As a historian of Palestinian art, she publishes essays of reference.

=== Biography of Fahrelnissa Zeid ===
In preparation for the Fahrelnissa Zeid retrospectives slated for 2017 at the Tate Modern and the Deutsche Bank Kunst Halle, Adila Laïdi-Hanieh obtained from the artist’s family access to her private papers, in 2016 to write her biography. Published in June 2017, the book was titled Fahrelnissa Zeid, Artist of Inner Worlds, and reconstituted the artist’s life and career, presented a new interpretation of her work, and debunked the myth of her influence by Islamic and Byzantine arts. It provides a revisionist and definitive account of both her life and the innovation and reinvention that characterized her career in Istanbul, London, and Paris, until her final decades working and teaching in Jordan. It redefines Fahrelnissa Zeid as an important modernist of the twentieth century by emphasizing her knowledge of European culture, evolving mental state, and challenging orientalist interpretations of her art.

The book was favorably received. Harper's Bazaar Arabia noted the book's "elegance, careful research, and its redefinition of Zeid as a prominent modernist painter". New York magazine praises its role in "bringing Zeid's work into collective consciousness". Cornucopia magazine described it as "comprehensive and painstakingly researched," suggesting it's a book worth reading and rereading. Third Text considers it a "timely and much-needed contribution to the study of transnational feminist art histories".

The book was translated into Turkish in 2018. Laïdi Hanieh continues to publish regularly on the artist and provide expertise on her paintings.

=== Museum work ===
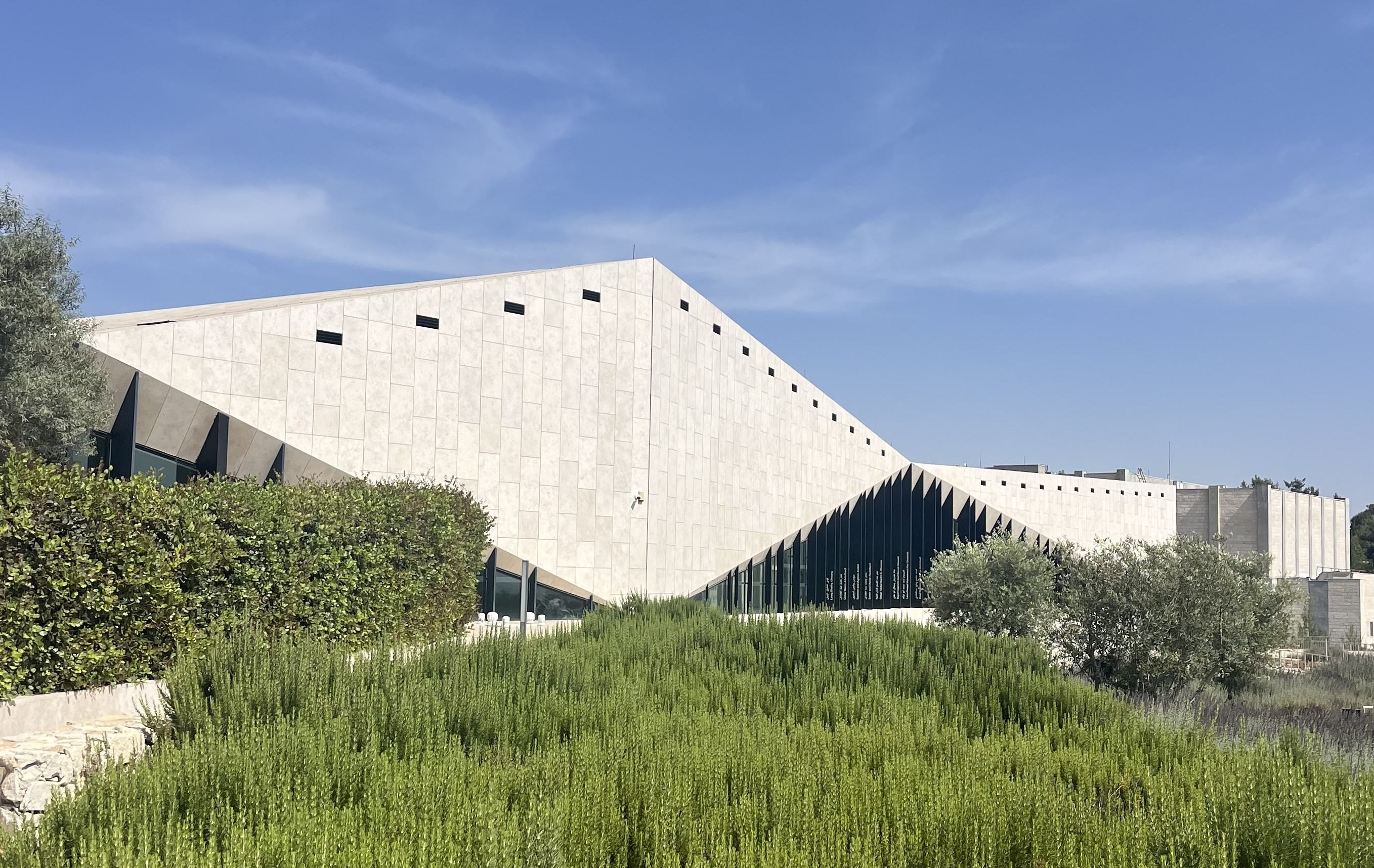
The Palestinian Museum

In September 2018 she was appointed director of the Palestinian Museum. She was the fourth director of the museum, succeeding Mahmoud Hawari, who served from 2016 to 2018.

Laïdi-Hanieh was responsible, for the first time after the museum opened in 2016, for developing an exhibition schedule for the upcoming years and with developing a five-year program strategy. Upon her appointment, she re-defined the museum’s core mission as being to create "emancipatory learning experiences" for visitors, from Palestine and the whole world. Under her directorship, the museum was awarded the 2019 Aga Khan Award for Architecture. During the COVID-19 pandemic she led the museum's digital engagement programme.

Laïdi-Hanieh focused on the development of the Palestinian Museum by raising internal structures, doubling permanent holdings, establishing new facilities, fostering international collaborations, supporting academic research, and launching the first Arab museum website for children in 2023.

In 2022, the online cultural platform BlooLoop recognized her as one of the "Power 10" museum influencers in its list of 50 key individuals in developing today’s museums. In 2023, the French government awarded her the National Order of Merit medal. She stepped down as director in August 2023.

== Awards ==
- Knight in the National Order of Merit (France)

== Selected works ==
- Laïdi-Hanieh, Adila (2008). Palestine : Rien ne nous manque ici. Paris : Éditions Cercle d’Art & Bruxelles : Revue Ah ! /Université Libre de Belgique. ISBN 978-2-7022-0885-4
- A. Laïdi-Hanieh. (2008). Inventer un Geste : L’Art Palestinien entre Modernité et Contemporanéité. L’Art-Même. 3(40), 4-7
- Laïdi-Hanieh, Adila. (2017). Fahrelnissa Zeid, Painter of Inner Worlds. Art/Books ISBN 978-1-908970-31-2
- Laïdi-Hanieh, Adila. (2018). Fahrelnissa Zeid: İç Dünyaların Ressamı Istanbul: Dirimart & RES.) ISBN 978-605-5815-49-3
