= Qalandiya International =

Art event held throughout Palestine

Qalandiya International is a contemporary art event and biennale that takes place every two years across Palestinian cities and villages. Founded in 2012, it brings together Palestinian and international art and culture organizations in collaboration to produce exhibitions, performances, talks, film screenings, workshops, and tours.

QI coincides with and incorporates The Jerusalem Show, a cultural event organized by the Al Ma'mal Foundation for Contemporary Art and centered in the Old City, and the Young Artist of the Year Award (YAYA), organized by the A. M. Qattan Foundation and given every two years to a Palestinian artist under the age of 30.

== History ==
=== QI 2012 ===
The inaugural Qalandiya International was conceived as a way to create an infrastructure that supported cultural practice across Palestine and the diaspora. It took place from 1–15 November 2012 under the title Art and Life in Palestine, and was co- produced by the Al-Ma’mal Foundation for Contemporary Art in Jerusalem (which had been producing The Jerusalem Show since 2007), Al Hoash- Palestinian Art Court, the International Academy of Art- Palestine, A. M. Qattan Foundation, Khalil Sakakini Cultural Center, and RIWAQ – Center for Architectural Conservation.

=== QI 2014 ===
The second edition of Qalandiya International ran from 22 October- 15 November 2014, under the title Archives Lived and Shared. The Palestinian Museum was added as a partner and hosted a documentary survey exhibition, called ‘Introduction to Palestinian Museums.’ Other partners included A. M. Qattan Foundation, Arab Cultural Association, Al Hoash- Palestinian Art Court, Al- Mashghal, The International Academy of Art- Palestine, Khalil Sakakini Cultural Center, RIWAQ – Center for Architectural Conservation, Ramallah Municipality, MinRASY Projects, Eltiqa Group, and Windows for Contemporary Art.

One of the main exhibitions, ‘Manam,’ which was organized by the Arab Cultural Association in Haifa, was unable to host many of its Palestinian participants, who were prevented from attending by the Israeli- imposed system of permits, roadblocks, and checkpoints.

=== QI 2016 ===
The third edition of Qalandiya International took place from 5–30 October 2016 under the title This Sea is Mine. Addressing themes of exile and return, the program launched with 15 exhibition openings and 80 events, taking place in Haifa, Gaza, Jerusalem, Ramallah and Al-Bireh, Bethlehem, Beirut, Amman, and London. Participating organizations included A. M. Qattan Foundation, Al Hoash – Palestinian Art Court, Al Ma'mal Foundation for Contemporary Art, Arab Culture Association, Dar Al Kalima, Dar El Nimer, Darat Al Funun, Eltiqa Group, International Academy of Art – Palestine, Khalil Sakakini Cultural Center, MinRASY Projects, Palestine Regeneration Group (PART), Ramallah Municipality, RIWAQ – Center for Architectural Conservation, Shababek for Contemporary Art, and The Palestinian Museum. Programs extended across a patchwork of venues, including, in addition to QI's main partners, the Palestinian Child Centre & Youth Activities Centre in Shu’fat Refugee Camp (Jerusalem), Dheisheh Refugee Camp (Bethlehem), Ramallah Recreational Complex, Birzeit University, the Palestinian National Garden, and others. Programs included ‘O Whale, Don’t Swallow Our Moon,’ a solo exhibition for artist Jumana Emil Abboud at the Khalil Sakakini Cultural Center in Ramallah. An online full exhibition catalogue for QI2016: This Sea is Mine was published by Ibraaz in October 2016.
