= Palestine Poster Project Archives =

Digital poster archive

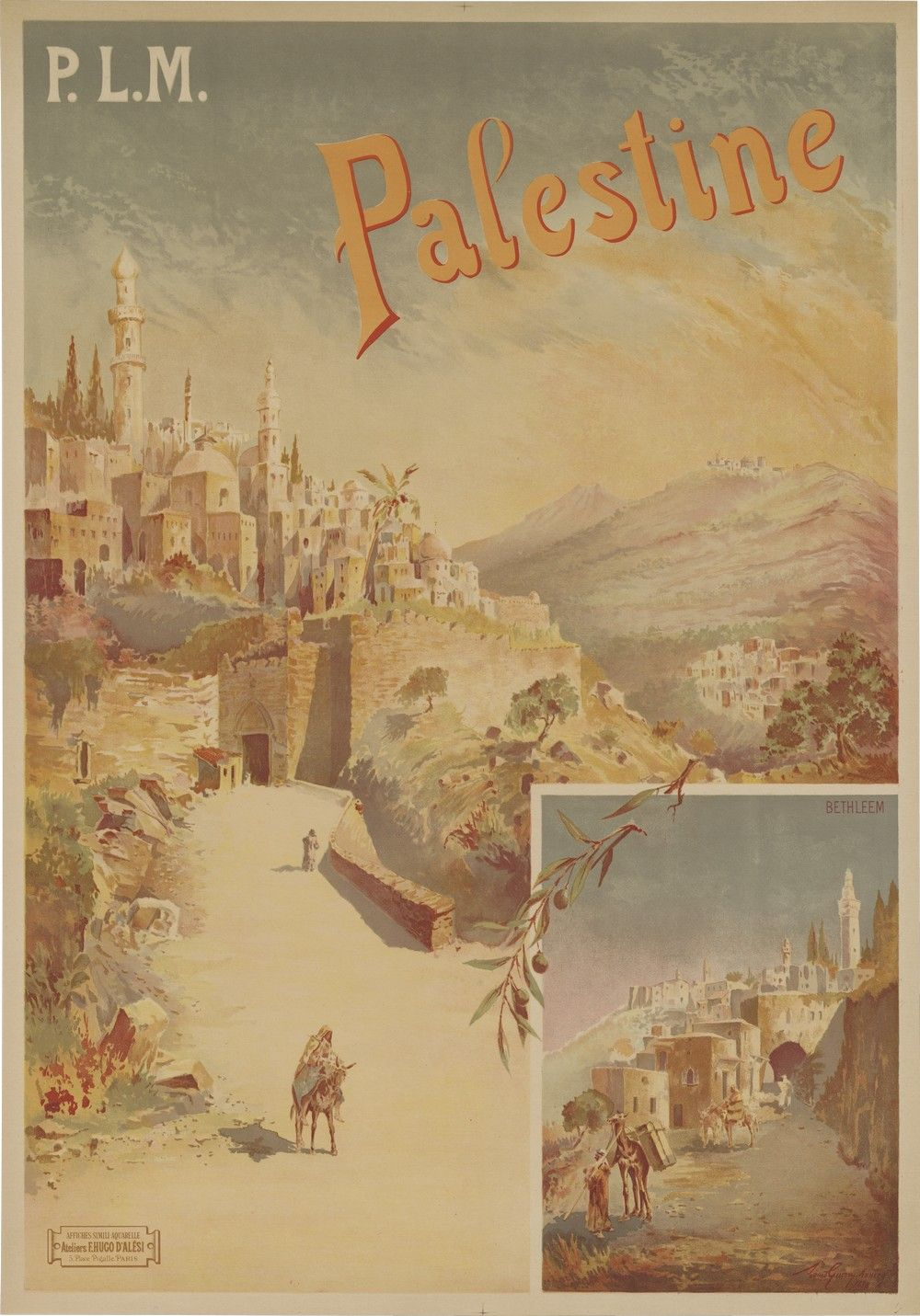
A French poster by artist Hugo D'Alesi. Dated 1898, it is one of the oldest Palestine posters in the archive.

The Palestine Poster Project Archives (PPPA) is a digital archive and collection of a variety of works in the Palestine poster genre, started by Dan Walsh in 2009. The Palestine poster genre is more than a century old and growing. The Palestine Poster Project Archives continues to expand as the largest online collection of such posters.

A majority of the works included in this archives are created by Palestinian artists, although the collection also features many works created by international, Zionist, and Israeli artists. More than 8,600 posters created by at least 1,750 artists are currently available on the Palestine Poster Project Archives’ website for public viewing.

== Background ==
As a Peace Corps volunteer in Morocco during the 1970s, Dan Walsh began a lifelong hobby of collecting Palestinian posters, the majority of which dealt with the theme of nationalism. Walsh initially received support from Dr. Edward Said through the American Palestine Education Foundation to transform his hobby into a public archive. In the early 2000s, Walsh founded the Palestine Poster Project Archives, an online public database that is frequently updated. He continues to avidly collect, document, and archive Palestinian posters from across the world today.

The Palestine Poster Project Archives was a key component of Walsh's thesis as a student in Georgetown University’s Master of Arts in Arab Studies program at the Center for Contemporary Arab Studies. This database was originally created for historians, educators, and advocates of public diplomacy.

== Definition ==
The Palestine poster genre dates back to the late nineteenth century. The Palestine Poster Project Archives entails that a poster with any of the following elements can be classified as a "Palestine poster":

- Any poster with the word "Palestine" in it, in any language, from any source or time period.
- Any poster created or published by any artist or agency claiming Palestinian nationality or Palestinian participation.
- Any poster published in the geographical territory of historic Palestine, at any point in history, including contemporary Israel.
- Any poster published by any source that relates directly to the social, cultural, political, military or economic history of Palestine.
- Any poster related to Zionism or anti-Zionism in any language, from any source, published after August 31, 1897.

== Historical context ==
Some of the earliest posters produced about Palestine were made by tourist companies in the late nineteenth century. In the 1890s, Zionist groups started making posters encouraging Jewish groups to immigrate to historic Palestine and urging international support for a Jewish state. In 1897, at the First Zionist Congress in Switzerland, attendants decided to adopt poster production as a significant resource to communicate and disseminate information. Intense production of Zionist posters continued for about fifty years, after which it waned.

When Palestinians experienced mass dislocation and exile in 1948, a series of events referred to as the 1948 Palestinian expulsion and flight, known in Arabic as al-Nakba ("the Catastrophe"), some prominent artists in Egypt, Syria, and other Arab countries began producing posters to convey support for a Palestinian state. According to Dan Walsh, founder of the Palestinian Poster Project Archives, as a result of the Battle of Karameh (Jordan) in 1968, the Palestine Liberation Organization began to more seriously consider the importance of international solidarity and information production and dissemination.

The PLO supported a particular style of Palestinian visual arts, leading to the rise of pamphleteer art and nationalist paintings that employed iconic imagery, symbols, and slogans for the Palestinian struggle. The Palestinian poster was seen as an especially useful medium for generating solidarity, representing narratives, and even mediating internal disagreements in Palestinian society. By the late 1960s and early 1970s, the production of Palestinian nationalist posters was prolific.

Until the 1990s, there were few major professional institutions or gallery spaces available to display work in the Gaza Strip and the West Bank. Therefore, artists often hung their posters in schools, town halls, union offices, public libraries, and other shared public spaces. Artist Marc Rudin explained, "The posters had to be designed to be posted in the refugee camps, in its narrow alleys, in Palestinian homes. But they were also to be used for information campaigns abroad". Artists designed their posters to be aesthetically pleasing, meaningful, and in many cases, communicative for both the Palestinian public and an international audience. Many Palestinian nationalist posters were displayed not only in public spaces in Palestinian towns and cities, but also in major urban spaces and capital cities throughout the Arab world and Europe.

Documentation of the Palestinian nationalist posters genre's evolution was fragmented, and at times violently interrupted, in the mid and late twentieth century. Ezzedin Kalak, the PLO's representative in France, was collecting hundreds of posters and postcards for a book about the significance of Palestinian posters when he was assassinated by the Israeli national intelligence agency (Mossad) in 1978. Kalak's project was never completed or published.

Palestine poster artists continue to contribute works to the ever-growing genre today. The majority of posters displayed in the Palestine Poster Project Archives are originally printed on paper. From the 1960s to the mid-1990s, most Palestine posters were printed in a single location and then distributed worldwide. Increased internet access in the Arab world and globally, in tandem with rising costs for print production en masse, has led many Palestine poster artists to localize printing operations rather than utilize large and centralized printing companies. An increasing number of new Palestine posters are being created digitally and then printed and distributed locally.

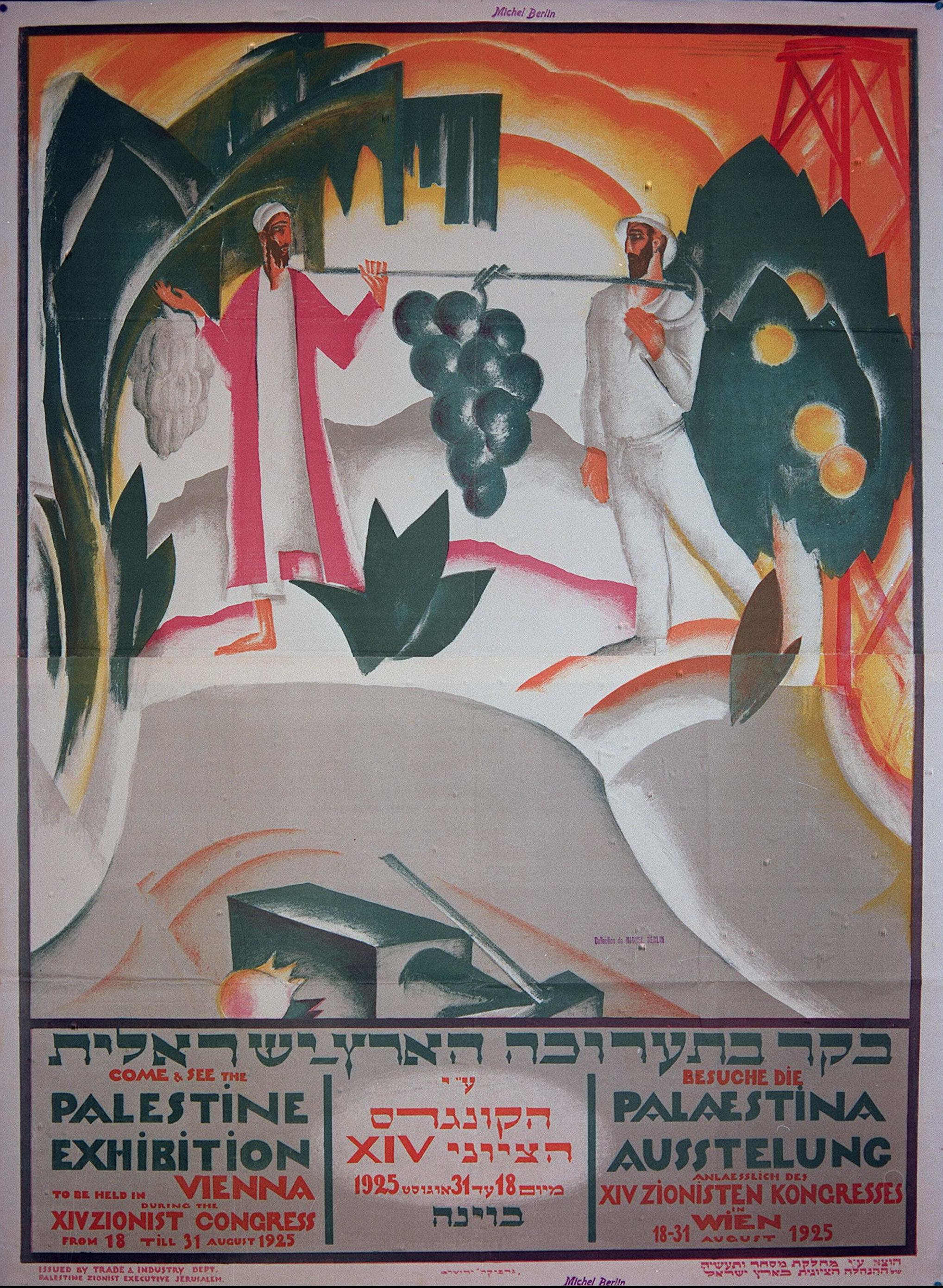
A 1925 poster by the Zionist Congress in Vienna. The archive collects and preserves posters by both Palestinian nationalist and Zionist artists.

== Organization of posters ==
The PPPA works are organized under various subcategories to ease a user's search. The "Special Categories" include a section entitled "Artists and Collectives" where some of the most prolific artists' works are gathered. Other sections under "Special Categories" include "Exhibits and Catalogs;" "Historical Figures and Themes;" "Political, Cultural, and Social Publishers;" and "Museums, Libraries, Private Collections, Universities, and Archives."

The PPPA also has a section entitled "Iconography" under which 40 types of reoccurring imagery, symbols, and representation are categorized. Some of these categories include "woman/female," "stone," "Palestinian flag," and "olives/trees/branches."

== Artists ==
According to Walsh, works featured in the Palestine Poster Project Archives can be divided into four major “wellsprings” or origins: Israeli and Zionist artists and agencies, Palestinian nationalist artists and agencies, Muslim and Arab artists and agencies, and international artists and agencies.

Some artists featured in the Palestine Poster Project Archives are not Palestinian, Jewish, or Israeli by origin. The Palestine Poster Project Archives currently holds posters made by artists from more than 123 countries, including historic countries like Yugoslavia and the USSR. For example, Marc Rudin, a Swiss-born artist with no Arab or Palestinian ancestry, worked as a graphic artist for the PLO between 1980 and 1991. During that time, he went by the pseudonym Jihad Mansour. Rudin produced nearly 200 posters about Palestine and worked most closely with the Popular Front for the Liberation of Palestine (PFLP) in Syria, Lebanon, and the West Bank.

Some Palestinian poster artists are Arab by descent, but not Palestinian. For instance, artist Burhan Karkoutly was Syrian by birth and created numerous posters for the PLO during the 1970s. Due to his commitment to and understanding of the Palestinian cause, Karkoutly was considered as one of the leading “Palestinian artists” of his era.

== Uses ==
Dan Walsh, the founder of the Palestine Poster Project Archives, originally envisioned that the archive would be useful for American high school educators teaching the history of the Israeli–Palestinian conflict. The archives could be incorporated into curricula for visual anthropology, art history, media studies, graphic design, and a variety of other subjects. Dan Walsh said in an interview with Al-Akhbar English: "There are two narratives presented at my website, the Palestinian nationalist and the political Zionist, and they've never been put together like this before."

The Palestine Poster Project Archives provides some context about the production of each poster, which typically includes the date that it was printed, the organization for which it was commissioned, and the artist's name. Sometimes information about the poster's dimensions (size) and medium are also included. Many of the posters with Arabic and Hebrew text have been translated into English.

== Presentations ==
In June 2012, the Palestinian American Research Center (PARC) sponsored Dan Walsh to present the Palestine Poster Project Archives in cities across the West Bank. This was the first time that the Palestine Poster Project Archives was formally presented in Palestine, although Walsh has made several media appearances and delivered lectures to promote the PPPA at various locations in the United States.

Walsh presented the Palestine Poster Project Archives at the following venues and locations during his 2012 tour:

- June 7 (Bethlehem) Dar Annadwa
- June 9 (Jenin) Freedom Theatre
- June 11 (Ramallah) Sakakini Cultural Center
- June 13 (Jerusalem) Al-Quds University Center for Jerusalem Studies
- June 14 (Nablus) An-Najah University
- June 15 (Haifa) Al-Warsha
- June 17 (Toulkarem) Dar Qandeel
- June 18 (Birzeit) Birzeit University Art and Ethnographic Museum
- June 21 (Al Farah, Nablus) Refugee Camp workshop with summer camp children
- June 22 Ramallah Municipality and Institute of Palestine Studies (workshop)
- June 27 (Ramallah) International Art Academy
