= Palestinian posters =

Medium for political messaging

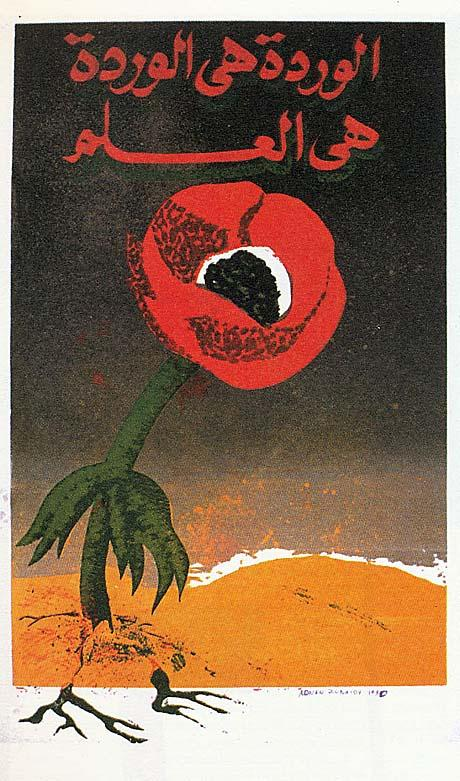
Poster created by Adnan al-Zubaidy and published by the Popular Front for the Liberation of Palestine in 1990.

Posters are a common medium for political messaging in Palestinian activism. Often depicting common national iconography such as keffiyehs, olive branches, and the Palestinian flag, posters have been instrumental in crafting a national Palestinian identity. Poster art was used as a support for the Palestinian National Movement, where it also became a vehicle for artistic expression. Posters are often categorized under topics of peace and resistance, employing images of suffering, martyrdom, and cultural heritage.

The emergence of the Palestine Poster Project Archives has made poster art much more accessible to the public; as of December 2024, the site has 22,004 posters and 4,806 artists listed. The rise of the Internet and digitization has also led to a surge of preservation efforts and increased public reception of exhibitions.

== History ==
=== Pre-1967 ===
Posters were produced in Palestine as early as the late 19th century. As a result of a broader trend of globalization, French and British companies sought to profit off of travel to the Mediterranean, financing marketing campaigns that advertised tourism in the Holy Land. The earliest known Palestine poster was published in France and depicts a landscape adorned with olive branches (presently regarded as one of the principal symbols of Palestinian identity).

Posters have been a defining feature in Palestinian visual culture since British Mandate rule (1920–1948). Initially, posters were made mostly for marketing, however, beginning in the 1930s, posters were used to advocate for Palestinian statehood. Posters were produced in the early 20th century protesting the British Mandate of Palestine. The use of posters as an art form declined during and immediately after the Nakba. Post-Nakba, a nationalist movement surged in which Palestinians sought a unified cultural identity. While previously the production of Palestinian posters was driven by commercial motives, the Israeli occupation prompted the assertion of cultural identity in Palestinian art through themes of land, exile, and resistance.

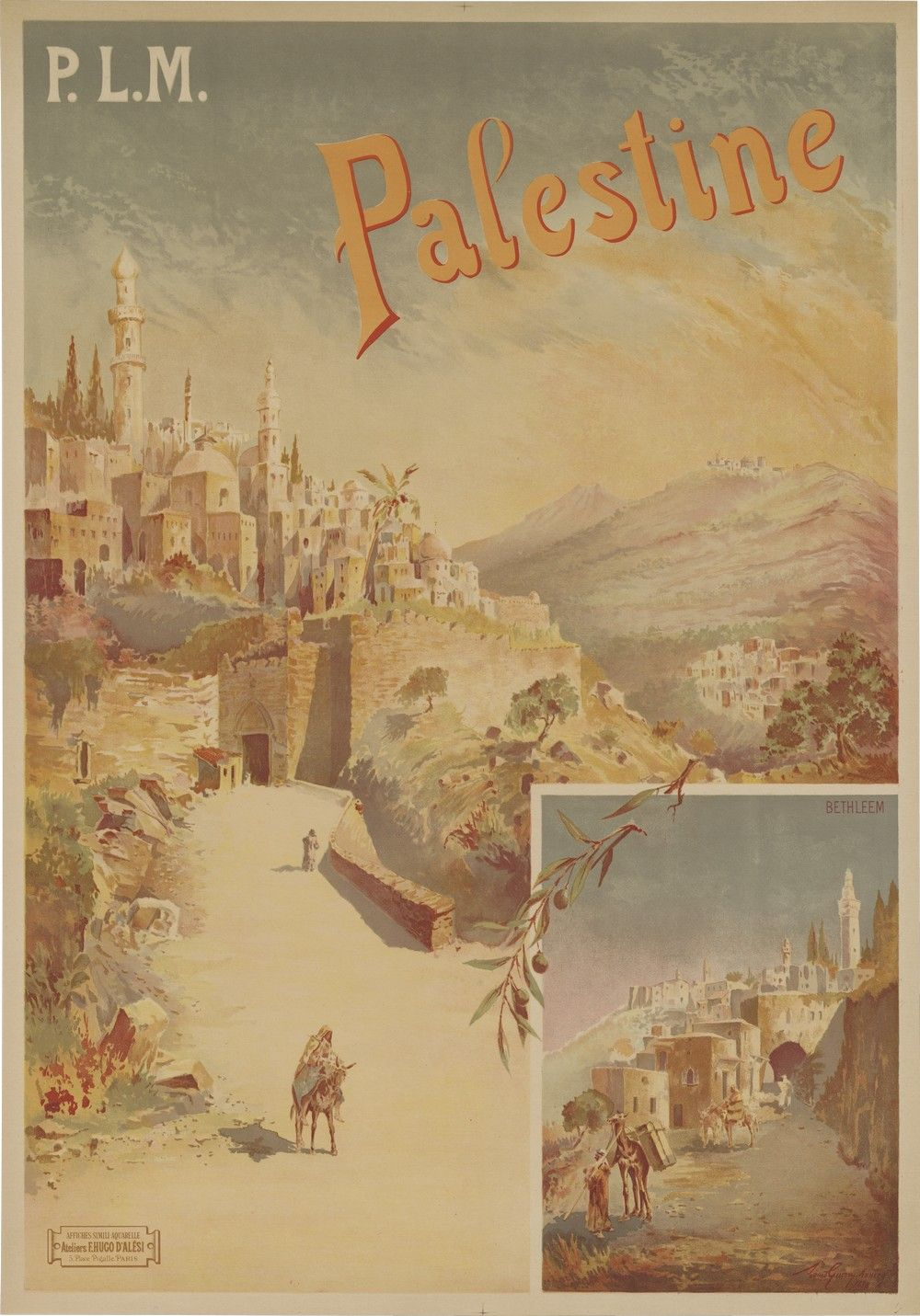
One of the earliest Palestine posters was created by French poster artist Hugo d'Alesi in 1898.

=== Post-1967 ===
At the turn of the 20th century, the poster emerged anew as a style of Palestinian art largely informed by global solidarity movements, particularly in the wake of the violent aftermath of the 1967 Six-Day War (referred to in Arabic as the Naksa). Posters were produced by numerous political organizations, mainly the Palestine Liberation Organization (PLO) as a means of mobilization and dissemination of nationalist rhetoric. Due to their ease of replication, posters were universalized and rapidly became a primary medium for resistance and artistic expression, as well as a tool of interface between those inside Palestine and those exiled outside of it.

One common theme of Palestinian posters during this period was as a way to commemorate martyrs, which includes Palestinian national heroes, militant fighters, and civilians that had been killed by the Israeli military.

=== Post-Oslo Accords ===
The use of posters to commemorate martyrs became very widespread during the Second Intifada, beginning in late 2000, and especially during and after the 2002 Battle of Jenin. One reason for this was a shift towards emphasis on memorializing martyrs as a way to express Palestinian nationalism and resistance against Israel.

The rise of the Internet allowed for a new wave of Palestinian cyber-activism. Democratized access to Palestinian poster archives meant there was an increased visibility of posters that might have not been seriously engaged with before, and the public could now interact with collections that only a select group of scholars previously had access to. Digitization of archives also meant that anyone could repurpose old posters, such as the "remixing" of the 1936 Zionist Visit Palestine poster, edited in protest of the West Bank barrier. In line with emerging technologies, posters became even more reproducible, and smaller artists could create digital posters to be platformed.

== Exhibitions of the posters ==
There have been a number of artistic exhibitions that feature Palestinian posters as either the primary focus or as a significant component. Known exhibitions have been housed in art museums and university buildings in the United States, Belgium, and Palestine.

Year	Title	Curators	Sponsors	Locations exhibited	Other information
1983	Personal collection of Daniel Walsh	Daniel Walsh	American Palestine Educational Foundation	UN General Assembly Building; New York City (1983)	Intended for exhibition at the UN International Conference on Palestine in Geneva; canceled.
1996–1997	Both Sides of Peace: Israeli – Palestinian Political Posters	Dana Bartelt Yossi Lemel Sliman Mansour Fawzy El Emrany	American Institute of Graphic Arts Raleigh Gallery Group of the Contemporary Art Museum	Contemporary Art Museum of Raleigh; Raleigh, North Carolina (1996) Colorado State University; Fort Collins, Colorado (1997)	
2008	Blue Square Posters Exhibition		Al-Quds University	Abu Jihad Museum for the Prisoners Movement Affairs; Jerusalem (2008)	The Abu Jihad Museum continually houses rotating exhibits of Palestinian posters.
2008–2013	Posters of the Palestinian Revolution: The Ezzeddin Kalak Collection	Rasha Salti	Palestinian General Delegation at the European Union, Belgium and Luxembourg Commissariat Général aux Relations Internationales International Relations Ministry in the French Community	The Mundaneum; Mons, Belgium (2008) Al Ma'mal Foundation for Contemporary Art; Jerusalem (2013)	Organized for the MASARAT Palestine initiative in Wallonie – Bruxelles.
2013	Personal collections of George Al Ama and Saleh Abdel Jawad	Inass Yassin	Birzeit University	Birzeit University Museum; Birzeit, Palestine (2013)	

== Preservation efforts and public reception ==
The Palestine Poster Project Archives (PPPA) was established by Arab studies scholar and curator Daniel Walsh as a means of accessibly preserving the history of Palestinian posters. In addition to Walsh's physical collection, digitized versions of archival materials have been made available on the project's website.

Walsh and the PPPA have been received with a number of controversies surrounding the works' public exhibition. In 1983, curated posters from Walsh's collection were exhibited in the UN General Assembly Building and were intended for display at the International Conference on Palestine in Geneva. An attending Israeli delegate submitted a formal complaint, calling the exhibition "more than anti-Israel", and the exhibit was rapidly disassembled and its presence at the Conference was cancelled. Later, Walsh curated a group of Palestine posters (entitled the Liberation Graphics Collection of Palestine Posters) to be nominated for the UNESCO International Memory of the World Register. The project was nominated and considered for the register in 2014–2015, 2016–2017, and 2023–2024. In 2015, UNESCO Director-General Irina Bokova criticized the collection, claiming that some of the included posters were antisemitic. UNESCO requested that Walsh revise the collection before it was evaluated for the register.

=== Domestic reception ===
Posters are commonly sponsored and published by different Palestinian political organizations. Major political groups in Palestine use posters to commemorate their leaders and members who have been killed in active struggle against Israeli forces, as well as Palestinian national figures. However, some political groups have posthumously claimed and associated themselves with civilians, even if the martyr was never politically active, especially in the case of young children. Because of this, some Palestinians view martyr posters specifically as political and publicity tools for various political organizations.

== Recurring visual themes ==
=== Resistance ===
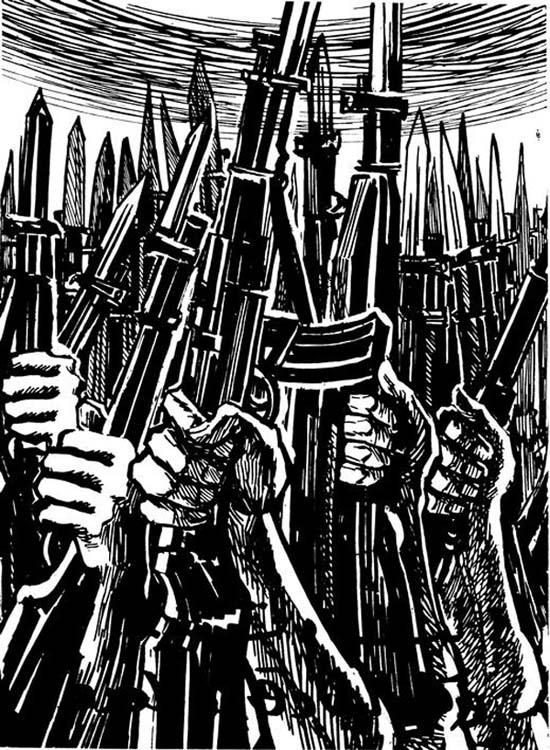
1968 Palestine poster depicting armed resistance. Created by Natheer Naba'a and published by Fatah.

Resistance has been represented in Palestinian posters in a variety of ways, such as "Anti Armor Hunters", "Graveyard for Invaders" and "Al Karameh – The Symbol". These posters depict the Battle of Karameh fought between the Palestine Liberation Organization (PLO) and Israel Defense Forces in 1968. Visually, the posters are in black and white and contain Arabic text. Militant language in their titles such as "hunters" and "invaders" gives more strength to the stakes of the armed resistance shown visually. The depictions of AK-47s, also referred to as the Kalashnikova is a recurring symbol in all three posters, but it is not only limited to the 1960s. For instance, Ghazi Iniam's 1984 poster "Through Posters and Pictures 2" highlights the importance of the Kalashnikova as a symbol of armed struggle, as it takes equal importance to the figure shown in the poster. Organizations such as the PLO, Fatah, Democratic Front for the Liberation of Palestine (DFLP), Popular Front for the Liberation of Palestine (PFLP), Palestinian Popular Struggle Front (PPSF), and the PLO Unified Information Office adopted images of armed struggle as well. In this time, artists would share their work amongst multiple organizations that included these symbols. These artists included Ghassan Kanafani, Tawfiq Abdel Al and Emad Abdel Wahhab, amongst others.

=== Cultural heritage and traditions ===
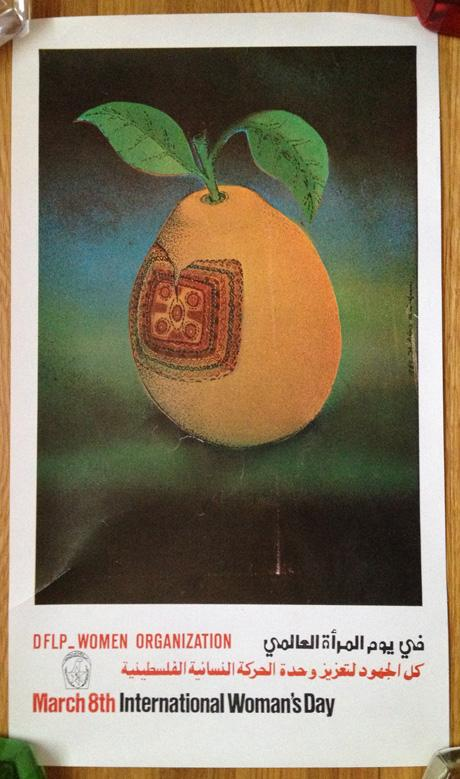
Poster by Jamal al-Afghani portraying a Jaffa orange patterned with tatreez, traditional Palestinian embroidery.

The most popular visual images and symbols of peace in Palestinian posters include the olive tree, the orange (notably the jaffa orange), the map of Palestine, the keffiyeh, and the key. The late 1970s to early 1980s saw a shift away from militant depictions of violence, instead valuing a poetic portrayal of resistance. This can be seen with artists like Helmi Eltouni and Sliman Mansour, as well as Abdel Rahman al-Muzain. The late 1970s to early 1980s saw an increase of women in poster art, including Mona Saudi and Jumana El Husseini. Emergence of tourism as a tool in Palestinian art also became popular. Julien Bousac's L'archipel de Palestine orientale sees the artistic exploration of the Oslo Accords and how they manifest geographically. Tourism posters were also published by airlines in the 1970s, including by Air France and Sabena Airlines. The original goal of the Palestinian cause sought tourism as the forefront, before the expansion into military resistance and later, symbols of peace and hope.

=== Martyrdom ===
Many Palestinian posters commemorate the anniversaries of historical events, battles, and massacres as well as days of recognition like Martyrs' Day or Prisoners' Day. Posters of individual victims of the occupation are also incredibly common, often mythologizing the subject as a martyr (Shahid, Arabic: شهيد). In Palestinian culture and society, a martyr can be anybody directly or indirectly killed by the Israeli occupation, regardless of whether or not they had been participating in active resistance or a member of a militant group.

These subjects can be prominent political figures, unnamed children, and everyday liberation fighters. These martyr posters are omnipresent in both public spaces and in the homes of the victims' families. In public, posters are often placed on walls, in shops and restaurants, on light poles, and can be shown on TV, turning their subjects into well known figures and heroic symbols of Palestinian nationalism and resistance. However, personal details are usually omitted from posters and popular memory, limited mostly to the martyr's name, and the time and place of their killing.

The practice of using posters to commemorate martyrs can be traced back to PLO-sponsored posters from the 1960s and 1970s. This method of memorialization became especially popular during the Second Intifada, with digitally designed posters being printed en-masse.

Commemorative posters are centered around a photograph of the martyr, made to look like a hero. Usually, it is a personal photograph, but posed photographs of the martyr holding guns are also common. The photograph is usually superimposed onto background scenery. Posters also can contain Palestinian national symbols, such as the flag and map of Palestine, religious sites like the Dome of the Rock and the Al-Aqsa Mosque, verses from the Quran, and symbols of various Palestinian political groups.

=== Political purposes ===
In Palestine, different political organizations claim martyrs and mainly use posters as symbolism in politically affiliated artistic expression. These posters often contain pictures of weapons along with political iconography, which can indicate the person's political allegiance. These posters not only memorialize individuals, they also participate in ongoing nationalism and martyrdom. The symbolic elements of the posters reflect different ideologies of different political groups, showing deeper meaning than tributes or typical propaganda uses, which is reflected through personal identity, common history, and memory.

== See also ==
- Palestine Poster Project Archives
- Palestinian art
- Palestinian nationalism
- Palestinian right of armed resistance
