= Beatrice Catanzaro =

Italian-Swedish artist (born 1975)

- Born: 1975 (age 50–51); San Donato Milanese
- Known for: Visual Arts

Beatrice Catanzaro (born 1975) is an Italian-Swedish artist known for her long term socially engaged art practice and exploring issues such as migration and cultural exchange. She has also worked as a professor.

== Biography ==
Catanzaro was born in San Donato, Milanese in 1975. Catanzaro has Ph.D. from Oxford Brookes University.

Between 2010 and 2015, Catanzaro lived between Jerusalem and Nablus, where she initiated Bait al Karama, a social enterprise and women community center in the Old City of Nablus. She also taught at the Art Academy of Palestine in Ramallah.

== Works ==
The Water Was Boiling at 34° 21' 29“ South, 18° 28' 19” East (2008), was an installation curated by Achille Bonito Oliva at the MART Museum of Rovereto. Singling her out from the 47 artists in the exhibition, Artforum described it as "worth commendation."

A Needle in the Binding (2011), Installation commissioned and curated by the Jerusalem Show, and the Al Ma'mal Foundation for Contemporary Art (Jerusalem). In 2008, Catanzaro discovered and became fascinated with the Prisoner's Section of the Nablus Library. The work represents the end product of research into the way that a library affected the lives of political prisoners between 1972 and 1995. A Needle in the Binding was also shown at the Ethnographic and Art Museum at Birzeit University.

Bait al Karama (2010-ongoing) is a social project that created a community center run by women in Nablus. The project generates income, along with social and educational programs. Palestinian women are beholder of gestures and tastes of the local culinary cultural heritage – a heritage that is quickly disappearing under the economical pressure of the occupation. In 2015 the project was presented at the European Parliament in Brussels. Contazaro is a co-founder of Bait al Karama.

Fatima’s Chronicles (2016) is a video installation shown at the Quadriennale, Palazzo delle Esposizioni, (Roma - Italy), and curated by Matteo Lucchetti. The Installation was inspired by the experience of Bait Al Karama, an association run by women for women in the Old City of Nablus, Palestine. The video depicts the hands of Fatima Kaddumy who is also a co-funder of Bait al Karama, mimicking the preparation of food as a gesture of hospitality. In contrast, two overhead projectors screen stories of asylum seekers and migrants encountered in Bolzano as part of another research, interwoven here with the reference to the Tessere Hospitalis, the documents used in ancient Rome to regulate access and ensure hospitality for foreigners.

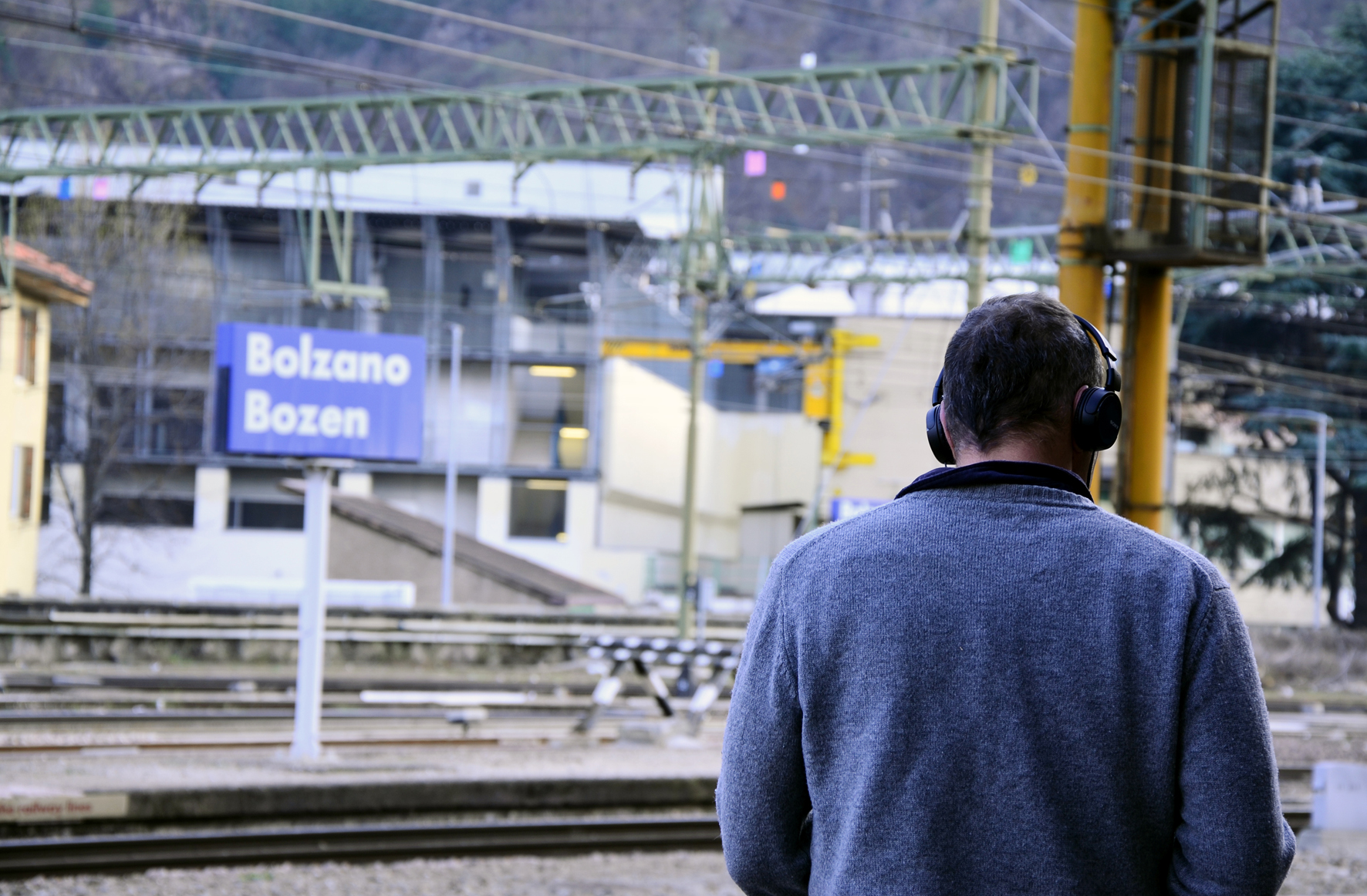
You Are But You Are Not, Beatrice Catanzaro, 2017

You Are But You Are Not, (2016–17) An audio-guide on the theme of borders and hospitality for the city of Bolzano. The project is a collaboration between Catanzaro, a geographer, Kolar Aparna, and with lyrics by Elena Pugliese. The group was invited by Lungomare in 2016 and started with an "artistic research residence." The project is a trilingual audio-guide on the theme of borders and hospitality. The work aims to offer a reflective journey into "our" procedures of hospitality in Europe. It also relies on metaphors to describe difficult concepts.
