= The Icon =

The Icon may refer to:

== People ==
- Matt Hardy (born 1974), American professional wrestler
- Shawn Michaels (born 1965), American professional wrestler
- The Sandman (wrestler) (born 1963), American professional wrestler nicknamed the Hardcore Icon
- Aaron "The Idol" Stevens (born 1982), American professional wrestler
- Sting (wrestler) (born 1959), American professional wrestler
- John Zandig (born 1971), American professional wrestler

== Other ==
- The Icon, a fictional restaurant on the British soap opera Doctors
- The Icon, a work by Palestinian visual artist Amer Shomali
