= Paul Cowan (filmmaker) =

Canadian filmmaker

Paul Cowan is a Canadian filmmaker who spent the bulk of his career with the National Film Board of Canada.

== Career ==
Cowan was nominated for an Academy Award for Documentary Feature for Going the Distance, a documentary about the 1978 Commonwealth Games. He was the director of the controversial docudrama The Kid Who Couldn't Miss and cinematographer on the Oscar-winning Flamenco at 5:15.

He is the winner of a Genie Award for his documentary Westray, on the Westray Mine disaster. He wrote and directed the 2005 documentary The Peacekeepers. He retired from the NFB in 2009, after directing a film adaptation of Margaret MacMillan's Peacemakers: The Paris Peace Conference of 1919 and Its Attempt to End War. He directed the 2012 documentary The Crash of Flight 810, part of TSN's Engraved on a Nation series of eight documentaries celebrating the 100th Grey Cup. It concerns the 1956 Trans-Canada Air Lines Flight 810 plane crash into Slesse Mountain in B.C. that killed all 62 people on board, including five football players returning from the annual East-West All-Star Game, and its impact on the players' families and Canadian football.

In 2014, Cowan completed the documentary The Wanted 18, co-directed with Palestinian artist Amer Shomali, about the efforts of the Palestinian town of Beit Sahour to establish an independent dairy industry during the First Intifada. The film premiered at the 2014 Toronto International Film Festival.

== Personal life ==
A resident of Westmount, Quebec, Cowan is married to CBC radio personality Katie Malloch.
