= Tarek Al-Ghoussein =

Kuwaiti Palestinian visual artist (1962–2022)

- طارق الغصين
- Born: 17 January 1962; Kuwait
- Died: 11 June 2022 (aged 60); New York City, USA
- Citizenship: Kuwait
- Occupation: artist

Tarek Al-Ghoussein (Arabic: طارق الغصين; 17 January 1962 – 11 June 2022), was a Kuwaiti Palestinian multi-genre artist best known for his work that investigates the margins between landscape photography, self-portraiture, and performance art. His work moved away from subjects of land, belonging, nostalgia and barriers and instead gravitated toward the metaphorical transit to his ancestral homeland - Palestine. He moved between abstraction and the explicit conditions found in certain places.

== Career ==
Tarek Al-Ghoussein was born in Kuwait to Kuwaiti parents of Palestinian ancestry who fled Ramleh, Israel during the Israeli war of independence. His father, Talat Al-Ghoussein, was a famous Kuwaiti journalist, editor and a diplomat who served as the Kuwaiti Ambassador to the United States during the 1960s. His family moved a lot during his childhood between Kuwait, United States, Morocco, and Japan. He received his bachelor's degree in photography from New York University and completed his master's degree in Fine Arts from University of New Mexico. He held several positions during his career, worked as a photojournalist, taught photography at the American University of Sharjah, and at the time of his death was a professor at New York University branch in Abu Dhabi.

== Selected exhibitions ==
- 1995 Zwemmers Fine Photographs, London, UK
- 2000 Sharjah Art Museum, Sharjah, UAE
- 2003 Randolph Street Gallery, Auckland, New Zealand
- 2004 Spectra Art Gallery, Copenhagen, Denmark
- 2004 Noorderlicht International Photography Exhibition, The Netherlands
- 2005 Sharjah International Biennial, Sharjah, UAE
- 2006 Political Realities, Heidelberg Museum, Heidelberg, Germany
- 2007 Art in Public Spaces, Light Boxes, Muscat, Oman
- 2008 Wonder, Singapore Biennale, Singapore
- 2009 In Absentia, Al Ma'mal Foundation for Contemporary Art, Jerusalem
- 2011 Emirati Expressions, Manarat Al Saadiyat, Abu Dhabi, UAE
- 2013 National Pavilion of Kuwait, 55th Venice Biennale, Venice, Italy
- 2014 K Files, Taymour Grahne Gallery, New York, USA

== Collection ==
Tarek's work has been collected by numerous museums and foundations worldwide such as Solomon R. Guggenheim Museum, New York; Victoria and Albert Museum, London; Royal Museum of Photography, Copenhagen; Darat Al-Funun, Amman, Jordan; Mathaf Museum, Doha, Qatar; Barjeel Art Foundation, Sharjah, UAE; British Museum, London, UK; Mori Art Museum, Tokyo, Japan; the Museum of Fine Arts, Houston, Texas, and the Sharjah Art Foundation in Sharjah, UAE.

== Publications ==
- Tarek Al-Ghoussein: Transfigurations
- In Absentia: Photographs by Tarek Al-Ghoussein
