= Noor Abuarafeh =

Palestinian visual artist

- نور أبو عرفة (Arabic); נור אבוארפה (Hebrew)
- Born: 1986 (age 39–40); Jerusalem
- Education: Bezalel Academy of Arts and Design

Noor Abuarafeh (born 1986, Jerusalem) is a Palestinian visual artist who works primarily with video installation, performance, and text-based art. Her work explores themes of memory, imagination, and the construction and interpretation of history.

== Education ==
Abuarafeh earned a bachelor's degree in fine arts from Bezalel Academy of Arts and Design. After graduating, she participated in the Homeworks Space Program, a one-year program at Ashkal Alwan in Lebanon.

== Career ==
Much of Abuarafeh's work is concerned with memory and archives, particularly the politics of what is included or excluded from archives. Abuarafeh is also interested in Palestinian art as a whole, especially how artwork made in Palestine reached Europe.

In 2017, she wrote the novel 'The Earth Doesn't Tell Its Secrets' -- His Father Once Said for the Sharjah Biennial 13.

In 2018, Abuarafeh competed a residency at the Delfina Foundation in London. As part of this residency, she published Rumours Began Some Time Ago, which detailed her residential research.

Abuarafeh's 2018 video piece, "Am I the ageless object at the museum?" was shown at the 2019 Mediterranea Biennale, the 11th Berlin Biennale (2020), the 59th Venice Biennale (2021), the Kamel Lazaar Foundation in Tunisia (2023), and the Fries Museum (2023-2024).

Abuarafeh had her first solo exhibition in 2019, at the Al Ma'mal Foundation for Contemporary Art in Jerusalem. In 2021, Abuarafeh had a solo exhibition at the Behna El Wekalah art space in Alexandria, Egypt. In 2023, Abuarafeh held her first solo exhibition in Germany at Kunstverein München. Her work was included in the exhibition Defenders of the Homeland at the B7L9 Art Station in January 2023. Her work is expected to appear at the 41st EVA International in August 2025.

Abuarafeh is a member of the Sharjah Art Foundation and has received a grant from the Arab Fund for Arts and Culture.
