= The Wanted 18 =

- The Wanted 18 official poster
- Directed by: Amer Shomali; Paul Cowan
- Produced by: Saed Andoni; Ina Fichman; Dominique Barneaud; Nathalie Cloutier
- Cinematography: Daniel Villeneuve; German Gutierrez
- Music by: Benoit Charest
- Distributed by: National Film Board of Canada
- Release date: 12 September 2014 (TIFF)
- Running time: 75 minutes
- Countries: Palestine, Canada, France
- Languages: Arabic, English, Hebrew

The Wanted 18 (Arabic: المطلوبون 18, romanized: al-maṭlūbūn 18) is a 2014 animated documentary about the efforts of Palestinians in Beit Sahour to start a small local dairy industry during the First Intifada, hiding a herd of 18 dairy cows from Israeli security forces when the dairy collective was deemed a threat to Israel's national security. The film combines documentary interviews with those involved in the events, archival footage, drawings, black-and-white stop-motion animation as well as re-enactments, and was co-directed by Canadian filmmaker Paul Cowan and Palestinian visual artist and director Amer Shomali. The film was the Palestinian entry for the Best Foreign Language Film at the 88th Academy Awards but was not nominated.

== Background ==
In the 1980s, as part of a Palestinian boycott of Israeli taxation and commodities, residents of Beit Sahour in the West Bank decided to form a collective and stop purchasing milk from Israeli companies, in a quest for greater self-sufficiency. They purchased cows from a sympathetic kibbutznik and set about teaching themselves how to care for the animals and milk them—even sending a member to the United States to learn dairy farming. The farm was a success, with strong local demand for “Intifada milk.” Despite the fact that the cows posed no serious economic threat to Israel, they were determined to be part of the boycott of Israeli administration, and hundreds of soldiers as well as military helicopters were used to search for the cows. The popularity of the cows increased support for the tax boycott, causing headaches for occupying forces.

== Animated sequences and visual style ==
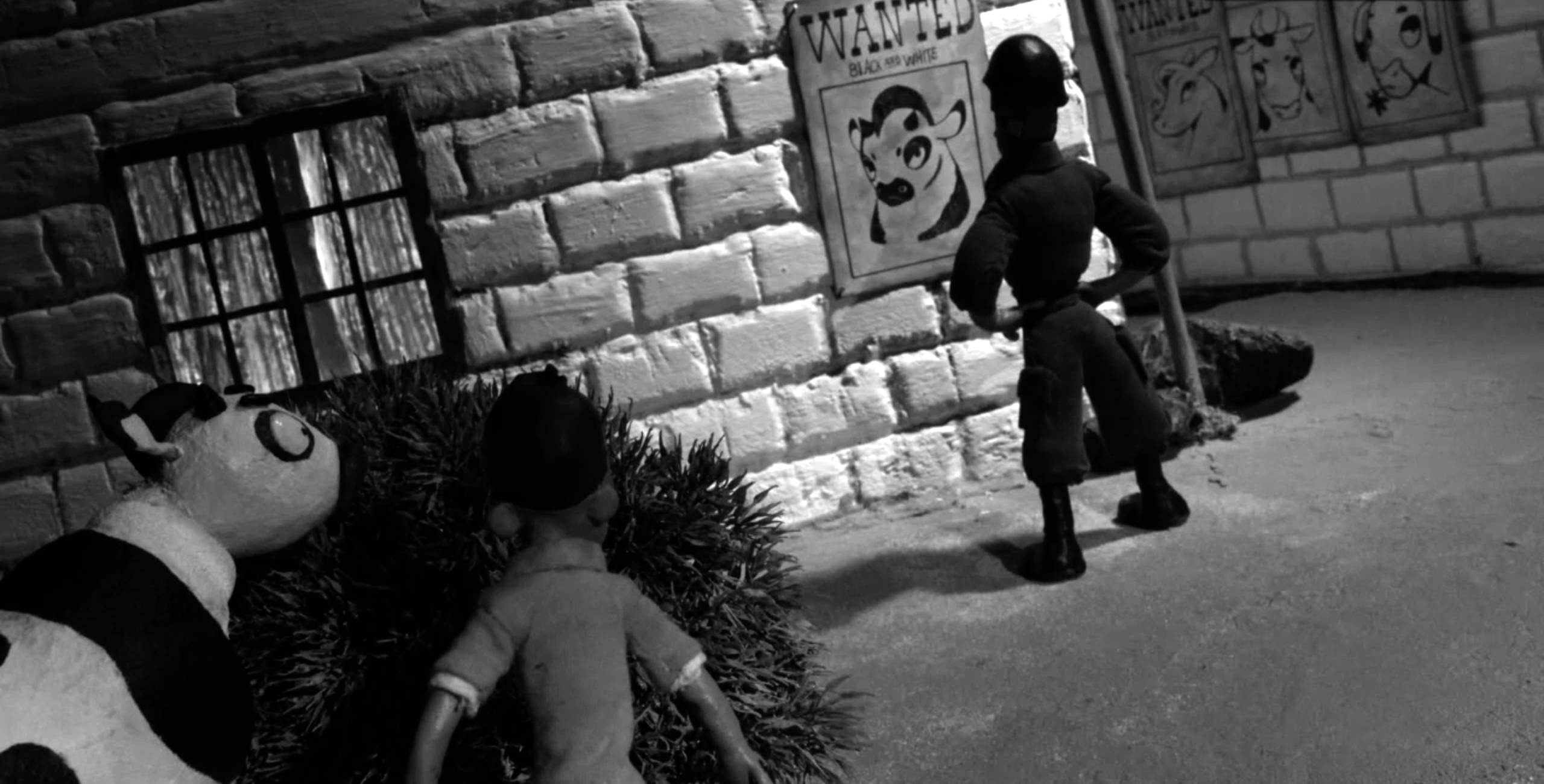
Claymation sequence from The Wanted 18

The film is framed as being told from the point of view of the cows—Rikva, Ruth, Lola and Goldie, who appear in humorous Claymation animated sequences. The filmmakers intended The Wanted 18 to have a comic book feel, even shooting live-action interviews at an angle to replicate the look of comic book panels. The director intended to use the cows point-of-view as a way for audience to sympathize with the subject matter. For Shomali, laughter is a way of non-violent disobedience.

== Production ==
The idea for the film began in Shomali's boyhood, spent largely at a Syrian refugee camp where his main escape had been reading comic books, one of which dealt with the story of the Beit Sahour cows. Montreal-based producer Ina Fichman first heard of the story when a group of producers and broadcasters at a documentary-pitch event Ramallah. Shomali's original intention had been to make a short animated film on the story. However, Fichman believed it had the makings of a feature documentary and approached veteran Montreal-based documentary filmmaker Paul Cowan. The project took nearly five years to complete—a lengthy process due to the time involved in creating the animation as well as the fact that Shomali and his Canadian collaborators lived thousands of miles apart.

Interviewed in the film are Jalal Oumsieh, a schoolteacher who had purchased the 18 cows, geology professor Jad Ishad, pharmacist Elias Rishmawi and butcher Virginia Saad. The film also interviews two members of the Israeli government: Shaltiel Lavie, then-military governor of the region, and Ehud Zrahiya, his Arab affairs adviser.

The film score is composed by Benoît Charest. The Wanted 18 is a co-production of Intuitive Pictures, the National Film Board of Canada, Bellota Films, Dar Films Productions, ARTE and 2M (see credits-end of documentary). The producers are Fichman and Nathalie Cloutier. The film received funding from the Beirut-based Arab Fund for Arts and Culture (AFAC). and from SANAD, Abu Dhabi film festival.

== Release ==
The film had its world premiere at the 2014 Toronto International Film Festival and was screened to a capacity crowd in Ramallah. Other festival screenings as of the fall of 2014 include the Abu Dhabi Film Festival, where the film received the award for Best Documentary from the Arab World, the Rencontres internationales du documentaire de Montréal, as well as the 2014 Carthage Film Festival, where the film received its Golden tanit for best documentary film. In 2015, it won Traverse City Film Festival Best Documentary award.

== Controversy ==
The film's director Amer Shomali was unable to attend a screening of the film at the Human Rights Watch International Film Festival in New York City when he was denied entry to Jerusalem by the Israeli regime on the grounds that he was an alleged security threat, and was therefore unable to attain a U.S. Visa.

== Reception ==
On review aggregator Rotten Tomatoes, the film holds an approval rating of 69% based on 13 reviews, with an average rating of 5.86/10. On Metacritic, the film has a weighted average score of 59 out of 100, based on 6 critics, indicating "mixed or average reviews".

=== Accolades ===
Award	Year	Category	Result	Ref(s).
Abu Dhabi Film Festival	2014	Best Documentary from the Arab World	Won	
Abu Dhabi Film Festival	2014	Black Pearl Award for Best Documentary Feature	Nominated	
Al Jazeera International Documentary Film Festival	2015	Al Jazeera Documentary Channel Award for Long Film	Won	
Carthage Film Festival	2014	Tanit d'Or for Documentary Feature Film	Won	
International Film Festival and Forum on Human Rights	2015	Special Mention of the Jury for Creative Documentary	Won	
Tallinn Black Nights Film Festival	2014	Best North American Independent Film	Nominated	
Traverse City Film Festival	2015	Founders Prize for Best Documentary	Won	

== See also ==
- List of submissions to the 88th Academy Awards for Best Foreign Language Film
- List of Palestinian submissions for the Academy Award for Best Foreign Language Film
