= Mahmoud Hawari =

Palestinian archaeologist and academic

Mahmoud Hawari is a Palestinian archaeologist and academic. From 2016 to 2018 he was the director of The Palestinian Museum in Birzeit (25 km north of Jerusalem), which was officially inaugurated in May 2016.

Mahmoud Hawari was born in Tarshiha, Israel, and received master's and PhD degrees from the University of London. From 2004 to 2007 he was a lecturer at the University of Oxford, and from 2009 to 2012 a visiting professor at Birzeit University, having previously taught at Al-Quds University and Bethlehem University.

He was appointed in May 2016, two weeks before the museum's opening, and succeeded Jack Persekian, who resigned over disagreements with the board after three and a half years.

Hawari was previously a research associate at the Khalili Research Centre, University of Oxford, and a curator at the British Museum in London.

In May 2016 he was preparing a book, The Citadel of Jerusalem: A Comprehensive Archaeological and Architectural Study, Monograph of the British Academy by Oxford University Press.

== Publications ==
- Ayyubid Jerusalem (1187-1250): an Architectural and Archaeological Study, (BAR International Series 1628, Archaeopress), Oxford, 2007 (ISBN 978-1407300429)
- Pilgrimage, Sciences and Sufism, Islamic Art in the West Bank and Gaza, (Palestinian Authority and Museum With No Frontiers, Electa, al-Faris), Vienna and Amman 2004 (co-author, co-editor). ISBN 1-874044-42-2
