= The Peacekeepers (film) =

- Theatrical release poster
- Directed by: Paul Cowan
- Produced by: Adam Symansky, Paul Saadoun
- Edited by: Hannele Halm
- Music by: Jean Mallet
- Production companies: 13 Production, ARTE
- Distributed by: BFS Entertainment
- Release date: 2005
- Running time: 87 minutes
- Country: Canada
- Languages: English, French

The Peacekeepers is a 2005 documentary film directed by Paul Cowan, following the United Nations mission in the Democratic Republic of the Congo in the Democratic Republic of Congo between 2002 and 2004. The film portrays the attempts of UN Peacekeepers to avert a crisis similar to Rwanda in 1994. The film mixes footage from the actual conflict with that of UN officials behind the lines, to give a comprehensive portrayal of the conflict.

== Synopsis ==
Paul Cowan presents the United Nations Department of Peacekeeping and their determined, if not desperate efforts to avert a disaster in the Democratic Republic of Congo similar to that of Rwandan. Cowan alternates between activity in the United Nations headquarters in New York, and what was happening in the DRC, on the ground.

== Filming ==
Set 3 years into the start of the Ituri conflict, the film is an in-depth look into the violent conflicts taking place in the region borne out of the Rwandan genocide, where ethnic tensions, a massive influx of arms, and the formation of warlord-led militias plagued the fragile country of the Democratic Republic of Congo between 1999 and 2003. The events of the documentary start 1 year and 1 day after the events of the September 11, 2001 attacks on the World Trade Center. Then president George W. Bush, leads the 57th UN General Assembly bringing the Ituri conflict to light. During this time, a contingent of Ugandan and Rwandan troops act as security deterrence for the region. UN Secretary General, Kofi Annan, chaired the meeting as he looked to expand on the current UN peacekeeping mission in the region.

The Congo mission by 2002 was non-military and consisting of unarmed military observers reporting on the conflict, but not actively engaging combatants. Since the 1999 to 2002, the United Nations has spent over $6 million USD to keep the peace in the region, but local warlords still continue to use violence as a means of controlling the population, often resulting in entire villages being massacred. It is during this time that troops from Uganda and Rwanda came into Congo as a means to keep some semblance of order. This fragile peace held together from the 2 countries is successful in keeping the conflict at a low level, but links between the troops and local warlords begin to emerge as UN investigators uncover rumours of collusion in the Ituri region.

The province of Bunia becomes sight of the Bogoro Massacre, in which some 200 villagers are killed, many of them hacked to death with machetes traditionally used by local militia. UN investigators are sent to the area to report on the situation, as rumours of Ugandan troops allowing the massacre to happen makes the UN question whether Uganda has ulterior motives in the region. To avoid more bloodshed, the UN sends 700 Uruguayan guard troops to the region to relieve the 5000 strong Ugandan force in the region. The situation becomes more hazardous on the ground, but the UN has a higher level of confidence in the UN peacekeeping force assigned to the area. As the situation intensifies, the UN brings talks of a multi-national force to keep order in the region to avoid another Rwandan genocide. France is asked to lead the mission, but only agrees for a limited amount of time due to having forces spread out in Afghanistan and other African nations.

Before a French force is able to arrive, Bunia erupts into a war zone among the militants in the region, causing a wave of refugees to flee from the countryside to into the city. The Uruguayan force, unable to engage the militias, are stationed at the UN headquarters and airport in Kinshasa. Due to the violence, refugees flood in into both UN compounds to seek refuge from the fighting. A humanitarian disaster is looming over the region, but France sends a battalion sized force to the region bringing back order and some stability to the region. The French force will not be there long however, as the UN decides on how allocate funding and military personnel to the region. Factions within the UN oppose the sending of a larger multinational force to the region citing cost of deployment and man-power being too high, which is estimated to cost $10 million USD per year to operate. Instead, a UN-Ituri force is to be assembled with the help of military advisers.

As the situation on the ground intensifies, UN forces are allowed a chapter 7 mandate, the ability to shoot on site against any forces they deem a threat. French-led military operations in the area stabilizes the Ituri region, declaring Bunia "weapons free" for a period of time. The French are scheduled to leave on September 1, 2003, replacing them is a multinational force of Pakistani, Indian, and Bangladeshi UN troops given their chapter 7 mandate to fight against the local militia. During this time, the first Ituri security brigade is raised from tribes of the local area given the task of defending and stabilizing their home region. UN military advisers are tasked with helping train, assist, and advise the Ituri brigade in order for them to become a self-sufficient force. As combat in the area decreases to a low-level insurgency, the UN was able to assess their mission on the ground level. Many of the military and policy makers become aware of what could have been a second Rwandan style genocide being averted as a result of the mission.

== Background ==
The Democratic Republic of Congo itself was borne out of the First Congo War, after the ousting of Mobutu Sésé Seko by the Alliance of Democratic Forces for the Liberation of Congo-Zaire(ADFL or ADFLC) in 1997. The instability caused by the First Congo War created the volatile conditions necessary for local warlords vying for control of conflict minerals and as a result, regional power formed from strength of arms and violence. Ethnic tensions between the Lendu and Hema tribes compound an already vulnerable state in Ituri, which started the larger Second Congo War. Much of the conflict can be traced back to conflict minerals that local warlords and militias controlling areas fight over, which are exacerbated by ethnic tensions.
