= Paul Devens =

Dutch artist

- Born: 1965 (age 60–61); Maastricht, the Netherlands
- Education: Academy of Fine Arts
- Alma mater: Jan van Eyck Academy
- Known for: Artist
- Style: Contemporary

Paul Devens (born 1965 in Maastricht, the Netherlands) is a Dutch contemporary artist. He lives and works in Maastricht.

Drawing on a research-based approach within his artistic practice, Paul Devens develops bodies of works that connect sound and architectural elements. As he generates and collects site-specific audio recordings, Devens actively considers the physical space and social context. He does this through the method of “acousmatic listening”: selecting aspects from particular situations and implementing them in a new one, oftentimes critiquing the original situation. His research manifests in sound-based installations, architectonic interventions, performances, and CD and vinyl releases. He considers the presence of the audience as an integral part of his installations and performances. His art practice furthermore alludes to infrastructures around value, preconception and code in civil society.

== Biography ==
Paul Devens studied at the Academy of Fine Arts and the Jan van Eyck Academy in Maastricht. He undertook residencies at the Kunstenus Hus in Oslo and Pepinières Europeènnes pour Jeunes Artistes in Grenoble, among others. He occasionally works as a curator and advisor, in addition to teaching at the Bachelor course at MaFAD.

Previous solo exhibitions include Les Brasseurs (Liège, 2019); bb15 (Linz, 2016); The Museum of Fine Art (Split, 2015); Z33, Z-out (Hasselt, 2012); Diapason Gallery (New York, 2011); OCA/ISP (Oslo, 2004).

His work has also been performed, screened and featured in group exhibitions in Ctrl_Alt_Del (Istanbul, 2003, 2005, 2007); Kunsthal Charlottenborg (Copenhagen, 2010); D-0 ARK Biennial of Bosnia-Herzegovina (Sarajevo, 2013); Jerusalem show (Jerusalem, 2014); Stimulating Synapse, EMAA (Nicosia, 2015); Hacking Habitat (Utrecht, 2016) among others.

== Art practice ==
Paul Devens's work stems from a longstanding investigation into how the historical, political and social layers of a specific context can be processed through sound in relation to the role of architecture within that given landscape. His field research results in sound installations that show the social situation of the place in a way that integrates the voice of political minorities, consequently amplifying an amendment to what is considered ‘reality’.

Throughout his artistic career, he is continuously exploring a new visual and audible vocabulary in order to catch the relevance of a moment and place. This language is formed by the economical, historical or political circumstances that are informing the work. The transformation of the original information into a work of art happens through a process of isolating sound from the original context, molding it manually and presenting it in a new context, to that end giving the act of recording new meaning. In recent projects he has been adopting the medium of radio, enabling him to address and involve (local) communities.

=== Works ===
His most notable body of work is the series ‘Folly’, made in respectively 2015 and 2016. Both works use architecture as a metaphor to showcase a shift in history. The first installation of the series is a wooden scale model of an abandoned store in the inaccessible UN-controlled buffer zone of the divided city of Lefkoşa / Lefkosia in Cyprus. As the mock-up decreases, a composition of sounds that were recorded in the area is played, touching upon the political conflict that characterizes the city. The original building this work is based on, is inaccessible since a long time. Devens revitalizes the building by projecting a composition of sounds from both North and South Cyrus in a 1:8 scale maquette, in a way that mimics the acoustic quality of the original building.

In sequel, Paul Devens created ‘Folly 2 / Igman Hotel’ as a result of his visit in Sarajevo. Following ‘Folly’, this installation consists of a wooden mock-up of the original hotel, which was built for the Sarajevo Olympics of 1984. After the Bosnian war the hotel was found to be in ruin – abandoned after the destructive assault of the area. The architectural model of the original hotel deconstructs over a period of ten minutes, reminiscing of the collapsing political system in former Bosnia Herzegovina during the war. This work builds upon Paul Virilio’s theory of the ‘integral accident’, in which he argues that the construction of a building simultaneously creates the condition for its collapse.

In this work, Devens refers to what Armando called ‘schuldig landschap’ (guilty landscape). With this phrase, Armando typified the landscape as a witness of what has happened at that location before. In this case, an abandoned hotel as a result of the Bosnian war. The landscape can be considered guilty because it facilitated the tragic. Nowadays it carries a loaded past; the landscape is not a neutral circumstance, but colors the events that happen in it. Devens deals with the landscape as a myth, carrying stories and remembrances, sometimes explicitly, at other times implicitly. Therefore, he makes audible the correlation between sound and contested happenings from the past.

The work ‘City Chase’, made in 2011-2012, consists of four rails with four speakers attached, each slowly moving from side to side along the rails. Each time this work has been exhibited, Devens conducted field recordings in the local area. All recordings for this work were made while cycling, making the recorded sounds of a transient nature, which recurs in the movement of the four speakers playing the sound recordings. In this way, the work reconstructs the movements of a city in sound, evoking a cinematographic experience. Yet, ‘City Chase’ is about movement in multiple dimensions: the movement of the sounds of the city, the movement of the speakers playing the sound composition, as well as the movement of the work itself, since the work has been traveling to multiple countries. In each city the sound library of the work grows. ‘City Chase’ offers the visitor a new way of experiencing sounds of their environment, enabling the environment to gain new meaning.

Early 2019, Devens presented his newest work ‘Dock / Ancien Palais de Justice’ at Les Brasseurs in Liège. For this work, the floor plan of the old Palais of justice in Dakar was used as a point of reference, and thereupon scaled down to fit the exhibition space of Les Brasseurs. This floor plan was drawn by aluminum sections carried by microphone tripods, providing rails through which audio tape was running. A tape-recorder interrupting the running tape meanwhile recorded the sounds produced by visitors in the space. The sound was simultaneously given back to the space, making the original sound increasingly obscure, mimicking the Alvin Lucier effect, as in the work ‘I’m sitting in a room’. The timespan of the delayed sound equaled the timespan of the tape to go around the floor plan once.

The work brings together various elements that initially don't belong together: the reference to the architecture of the original Palais of justice as well as the dimensioning of the floor plan serving as a stage for sound. Wanting to project the past onto the present day, ‘Dock / Ancien Palais de Justice’ delivers critique onto colonial history through highlighting and displacing the modernist architectural influence, and makes this audible in sound. Sounds of today are projected onto a framework of the past. Next to the spatial sound installation, Devens worked as a curator in collaboration with Cedrik Fermont and developed a listening space revolving around the theme of ‘habitat’. Sound artists from all over the world were asked to contribute with a sound piece around the potentiality and lack of having a habitat.

Paul Devens is currently preparing a major solo show at the Bonnefantenmuseum in Maastricht (NL), planned to open in 2020. In autumn 2019, he will be undertaking a residency at the Instituto Buena Bista in Curaçao (CW) as a continuation of his residency period in 2018.

=== Music and performance ===
Devens has performed internationally at venues such as The Pipefactory, GI (Glasgow, 2018), Dani Performansa (Varazdin, 2016), Al Ma'mal Foundation for Contemporary Art, with darbuka player Raed Saeed (Jerusalem, 2014), Extrapool (Nijmegen, 2011), Radiaator, Radio Art Festival Tallinn (2011) and Phill Niblock's EI festival (New York, 2006, 2009). These concerts and performances were based upon improvisations with home made electronics, laptop, synthesizers and occasionally percussion instruments. In 2016 Devens co-founded the band Otomax. This collective can be defined as an improvisational non-pop band and is characterized by its use of circuit-bent instruments, analogue synthesizers, voice and Game Boy. Otomax profiles itself also as an artists group at art spaces. Other, more incidental projects and cooperations are electro-noise / impro band Kendo Bahn Orchestra (with drummer Roy Moonen) and the Buena Bista Bare Bone Band, a student band with homemade instruments (IBB, Curaçao, 2018).

== Bibliography ==
- Budé, Frans; Devens, Paul (1998). MODEL(book): Paul Devens (in Dutch). Maastricht: Devens. ISBN 9789080433410. OCLC 68058308.
- Bosch, Bert van den; Stichting Hedah, centrum voor hedendaagse kunst (Maastricht) (2000). H5 (in Dutch). Maastricht: Hedah, Stichting Centrum voor Hedendaagse Kunst. ISBN 9789090143460. OCLC 67397550.
- 'Art-Ist 6'; Magazine, article by Bașak Şenova; Güncel Sanat Seçkisi; 2003
- Bex, Florent; Gielen, Pascal; Braeckman, Inge; Albers, Anthony; Nuyts, Rebecca; D'Hooge, Robin; Platform Limburg Beeldende kunsten; Provincie Limburg (2007). Power plays; Artist collected : interior desires, exterior spaces. Hasselt Hasselt Platform Limburg Beeldende kunsten Provincie Limburg. ISBN 9789074605311.
- 'Gonzo Circus 105'; Magazine, co-written and edited section about project 'Panels'; Gonzo Circus VZW; 2011
- 'Resonance'; group catalogue; European Sound Art Network 2010 - 2014; 2014
- Senova, Basak; Miljević Hozić, Sandra, eds. (2015). Project D-0 ARK. Sarajevo: Association Biennial of Contemporary Art, Sarajevo. ISBN 978-9958-0966-1-7.
- 'Residu 3, Pompgemaal Den Helder 2012 - 2015'; group catalogue; Mondriaan Fund; 2015
- Lomme, Freek (2014). Paul Devens. Waving platforms. EINDHOVEN: Onomatopee. ISBN 9789491677137. OCLC 894202186.
- Ozanne, Anna (June 2017). "Quand l'écho devient l'énoncé". Dérivations. 4: 184–187. ISBN 978-2-930878-05-8.

== CD / vinyl releases (selection, solo) ==
- Signs Signals Tunes (Jan van Eijck Academy Maastricht,1992) – audio CD
- Belt 3 (le Magazin / l'Ecole des Beaux Arts, Grenoble, 1994) – audio CD & folder
- DJ Lait Russe (2001) – audio CD
- Exwork (MOAB Records, 2008) – audio CD
- Ink Summit (MOAB records, 2009) – 12" vinyl album
- Tracker (D-0 Ark, Sarajevo / MOAB records, 2013) – 12" vinyl album
- Tracker / Axis (Province of Limburg / MOAB records, 2014) – 12" vinyl album
