= Faisal Darraj =

Palestinian literary and cultural critic

Faisal Darraj (born 1943) is an Arab literary and cultural critic.

== Selected works ==
- Marxism and Religion (1977)
- Reality and Utopia: A Contribution in Literary Politics (1989)
- The Misery of Culture in the Palestinian Institution (1996)
- The Future of Arabic Criticism (1998)
- The Theory of the Novel and the Arabic Novel (1999)
- Memory of the Defeated: Defeat and Zionism in the Palestinian Literary Discourse (2002)
- The Novel and the Hermeneutics of History (2004)
- Retreating Modernity: Taha Hussein and Adonis (2005)
