= Jumana Emil Abboud =

Palestinian artist

Jumana Emil Abboud (Arabic: جمانة إميل عبّود) is a Palestinian artist living and working in Jerusalem.

Abboud was awarded the AFAC GRANT and the Pernod Ricard Fellowship, in addition to the Sharjah Art Foundation production grant. Her work has been included in exhibitions at the Sydney Biennial, Venice Biennale, Sharjah Biennal, and the Istanbul Biennial. the Bahrain National Museum in Manama, the Arab World Institute in Paris, The Jerusalem Show, the Darat al Funun in Amman, at the Carré d'Art in Nîmes. at the Gallery for Contemporary Arts in Leipzig and at the Museo Fundacion Antonio Perez in Cuenca.

== Life ==
Jumana Emil Abboud was born in 1971, in Shefa-Amr (or Shfar'am) and moved to Canada with her family when she was eight years old. Her interest for visual arts started after moving to Canada while adapting to a school in the English language, when Abboud turned to art courses offered by the school, including drawing, still-life painting and calligraphy. Abboud studied at the Ontario College of Arts in Toronto between 1989 and 1991. Her studies were abruptly interrupted in 1991 when she returned to Shefa-Amr with her siblings and mother after the sudden death of her father. Abboud later enrolled at the Bezalel Academy of Art and Design in Jerusalem, where she graduated in 1996.

== Work ==
Abboud uses a combination of drawing, video, installation, speech, performance, text and sculpture to portray themes of memory, loss, belonging, and longing. Abboud draws on her own background and Palestinian culture and traditions in her installations. She explores memory, storytelling and oral history through the body and her use of Palestinian folklore and fairy tales, frequently featuring the Palestinian landscape.

Abboud reinterprets fairytales in her work. She uses the well-known story of Rapunzel to explore the life of Arab women. In this series she uses pencil sketches, photos, lace, and seeds to comment on and depict the woman's normative place in society.

Hide Your Water from the Sun is a three-channel video installation that highlights the 1920 study performed by Dr. Tawfiq Canaan about water demons and "haunted" sites such as springs. The essay "Hide Your Water from the Sun: A Performance for Spirited Waters" was written as part of a performance by Abboud at the Khalil Sakakini Cultural Center in 2016. With the help of photographer Issa Freij, the artist identified spirited water spots in the topography of Palestine, based on her childhood memories and a 1922 study on Haunted Springs and Water Demons in Palestine.

Abboud worked with Issa Freij, a Palestinian filmmaker, to document the sites. The installation features video of the sites featured in the 1920 study that once contained springs and other water features that have since been lost, but whose locations are a part of Palestinian folklore.

Abboud has shown her work 'Suspicions' (mixed media in wood box) in London in 1998 in an exhibition at Candid Arts Trust called Story Time (Arabic: وقت القصة, Hebrew: זמן סיפור) which was curated by Anna Sherbany. This is the first exhibition of work by Jewish and Palestinian Arab artists living in Israel/Palestine to be held in London. The curator has annotated that she describes Israel/Palestine, the territory that has and continues to be repositioned, through partition, occupation and colonisation. Abboud has shared a reflection about her work in the exhibition catalogue:

“The inspiration for my work derives mainly from my experiences as a Palestinian woman. The experiences are not always necessarily personal ones. Listen. I observe. I contemplate. The environment contributes to my imaginary sense – I walk down the narrow street of an Arabic market, crowded with layer upon layer of wealth. I visit a house deeply-rooted in traditional and ornamental spirits. I am told a story. And another. Life is so fragile. I devote myself to the fragility, to the nostalgic, to the ironic. I seek out the presence of a woman; or perhaps it is she whoo seeks me out…I attempt to express her intimate voice. To copy the embroidered smile (or frown) of her soul; her womanhood. Everything speaks itself to me in symbols with transparent, or not so transparent, metaphors. The canvas with which I begin is never white, never bare.. Rather it is clothed to the fullest so that my work ends up being the ‘taking away from’, the disarming, the undressing part by part until I have found the appropriate element to fixate on for the moment.”

== Exhibitions ==
Solo Exhibitions

- Jumana Emil Abboud, BALTIC Centre for Contemporary Art, Gateshead (May–October 2016)

Group Exhibitions

- ‘Palestin(a) - Eight Woman Artists’, Al Wasiti Art Center, Jerusalem. (1998–1999)
- Mediterranean Biennial for Young Artists, Rome. (1999)
- 'Gateway’, National Gallery of Fine Arts, Amman. (1999)
- ‘Palestinian Artists Today’, Drammens Museum, Norway. (1999)
- Murals in the city, Jericho Winter Festival, Jericho. (1999)
- ‘Look Mama Look’, Art Focus, Jerusalem. (1999)
- The Last Drawing of the Century’, Zerynthia Center for Contemporary Art, Rome. (2000)
- 'Empathy’, Galerie im Kornerpark, Berlin. (2000)
- La Havana International Biennial, Havana. (2000)
- 'DisOrientation’, House of World Culture, Berlin. (2003)
- 'Unscene’, Stephen Lawrence Gallery, London. (2004)
- 'Shame’, Holon Center for Digital Art, Holon. (2004)
- 'Belonging’, The Seventh International Sharjah Biennial, U.A.E. (2005)
- 'Streams of Story’, Tramway, Glasgow International, Glasgow. (2006)
- 'Liminal Spaces’, Gallery for Contemporary Arts, Leipzig. (2006)
- 'Re-Considering Palestinian Art', The Antonio Pérez Foundation, Cuenca, Spain. (2006)
- 'Blindes Vertrauen', Galerie Nord | Kunstverein Tiergarten, Berlin. (2010)
- Sharjah Biennial, Sharjah (2017)
- 'The Unbearable Halfness of Being', documenta fifteen, Grimmwelt Kassel, Kassel. (2022).
