= Al Ma'mal Foundation for Contemporary Art =

Art museum in Jerusalem

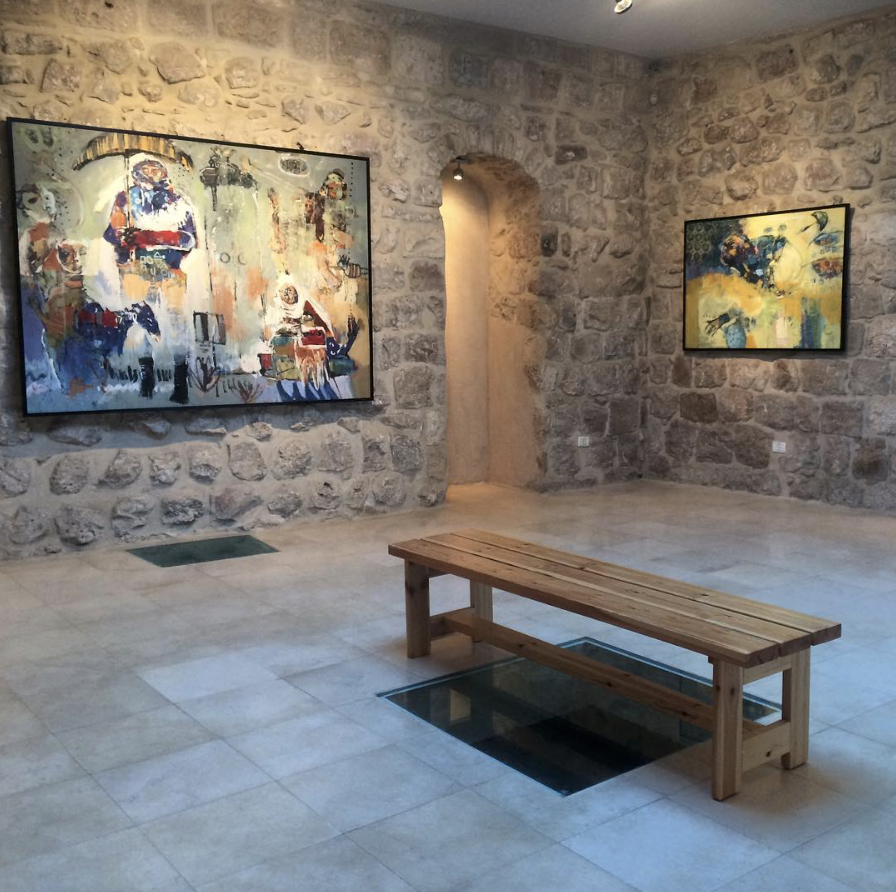
- Established: 1998; 28 years ago
- Location: Old City of Jerusalem, Israel
- Type: Non-profit art institution
- Website: almamal.org

Al Ma’mal Foundation for Contemporary Art is a non-profit arts organization founded in 1998 in the Old City of Jerusalem, Palestine. Its programming includes contemporary art exhibitions, live music, an artist residency program, and workshops.

== History ==
Al Ma’mal is situated in the former Kassissieh Tile Factory; Ma’mal means “factory” in Arabic. In 1900, the Kassissieh family established a tile factory in the Old City. The factory produced patterned floor tiles commonly found in Palestinian homes. Eventually, the factory became one of the main tile factories in Palestine. It was active until the mid-1970s, when the Jerusalem Municipality withdrew licenses from all factories operating inside the Old City.

In 1992, artist and curator Jack Persekian founded the Gallery Anadiel in the Old City, as the first independent gallery in the Palestinian territories under Israeli occupation, with a focus on contemporary Palestinian artists. By the mid-1990s, a group of artists and activists decided to initiate a contemporary art foundation in Jerusalem. The planning began at Gallery Anadiel, where Issa Kassissieh proposed renovating the tile factory building and turning it into the headquarters for the new art foundation. After an agreement with the Kassisseh family was reached, the Al Ma’mal Foundation was officially founded in 1998.

In 2013, the foundation moved into the former tile factory.

== Exhibitions ==
Al Ma’mal has been described as "the nucleus for the latest Palestinian art revival in East Jerusalem."

Al Ma’mal hosts exhibitions by both Palestinian and international artists, including Tarek Al-Ghoussein, Johny Andonia, Alice Creischer, Nicola Saig, Suzan Hijab, Noor Abuarafeh, Benji Boyadgian, Mohammad S. Khalil, Inas Halabi, Fazel Sheikh, Beatrice Catanzaro, Bruno Fret, Paul Devens, Tanya Habjouqa, Emily Jacir, and others.

== Programs ==
Al Ma’mal hosts an artist residency program. For the artist-in-residence program, local and international artists live in East Jerusalem and develop, produce and present new work, while participating in a cultural exchange with the city.

Al Ma’mal biannually presents The Jerusalem Show, an event consisting of exhibitions, performances, workshops, talks, film screenings, and guided tours in the Old City. The Show is part of Qalandiya International, a biennial celebration of Palestinian art and culture organized in partnership with other Palestinian institutions.
