= Matteo Lucchetti =

Italian art critic and curator (born 1984)

Matteo Lucchetti (born in 1984 in Sarzana, Italy) is a curator and contemporary art critic based in Brussels. He is curator, together with Judith Wielander, of the Visible project, a research and biennial award for socially engaged artistic practices in a global context, initiated and supported by Cittadellarte - Fondazione Pistoletto and Fondazione Zegna.

His main curatorial interests are focused on artistic practices that claim to redefine the role of art and the artist in society. His curatorial projects include: First Person Plural: Empathy, Intimacy, Irony, and Anger, (BAK, Utrecht, 2018), Marinella Senatore:Piazza Universale/Social Stages (Queens Museum, New York, 2017), De Rerum Rurale, (16th Rome Quadriennale, Rome, 2016); Don’t Embarrass the Bureau, (Lunds Konsthall, Lund, 2014); Enacting Populism in its Mediæscape, (Kadist Art Foundation, Paris, 2012); and Practicing Memory, Fondazione Pistoletto, Biella, 2010. In the projects he curated, Lucchetti has worked with artists such as Lawrence Abu Hamdan, Rossella Biscotti, Nástio Mosquito, Marinella Senatore, Jonas Staal, SUPERFLEX, Stefanos Tsivopoulos, Pilvi Takala, and Stephen Willats, among others. He served as Curator of Exhibitions and Public Programs at BAK, Utrecht in 2017–2018.

Lucchetti has worked as curator in residence at Para Site, Hong Kong; Kadist Art Foundation, Paris; and AIR, Antwerp. During his residency at BAK in 2010, Lucchetti worked in the frame of the Former West project to develop curatorial and discursive possibilities for the new online platform of the research—the digital archive. He has organized and taken part in several seminars, talks, and debates at various institutions, such as the Centre d’Art Contemporain, Geneva; Steirischer Herbst, Graz; and the Centre for Historical Reenactments, Johannesburg. He lectured as a guest professor at HISK, Gent; Piet Zwart Institute, Rotterdam; Sint Lucas Antwerpen, Antwerp; and Accademia di Belle Arti di Brera, Milan, and contributed to magazines such as Mousse Magazine, Manifesta Journal, and Art Agenda.
