= Amer Shomali =

Palestinian visual artist

Amer Shomali (Arabic: عامر شوملي, born 1981) is a Palestinian interdisciplinary visual artist who uses conceptual art, painting, digital media, films and comics to explore Palestinian sociopolitical issues and revolution iconography.

== Early life and education ==
Shomali was born in Kuwait in 1981 and lives in Ramallah, West Bank. He holds a master's degree in animation from the Arts University Bournemouth in the United Kingdom and a bachelor's degree in architecture from Birzeit University, West Bank, Palestine.

== Selected work ==
In 2006, he was one of 13 artists in the Palestinian Filmmakers’ Collective to contribute a short work to the anthology film, Summer 2006, Palestine, offering a portrait of Palestinian society. In 2011, Shomali exhibited his work The Icon a portrait of Leila Khaled made of 3500 lipsticks.

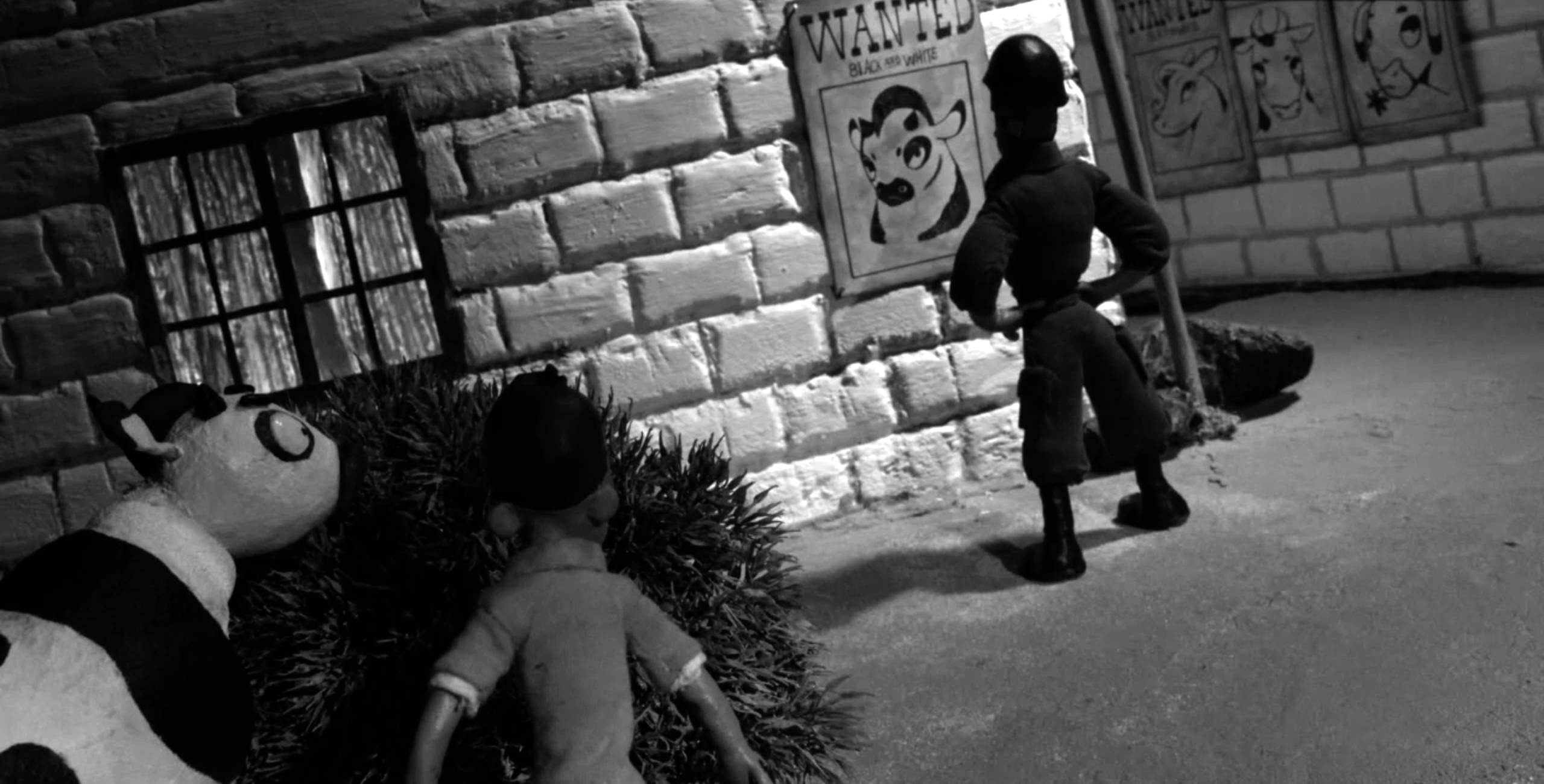
From The Wanted 18

In 2014, Shomali completed the documentary The Wanted 18, co-directed with Canadian director Paul Cowan, about the efforts of his Palestinian town of Beit Sahour to establish an independent dairy industry during the First Intifada. The film premiered at the 2014 Toronto International Film Festival. The idea for The Wanted 18 began in Shomali's boyhood, spent largely at a Syrian refugee camp, where his main escape had been reading comic books, one of which dealt with the story of the Beit Sahour cows. He had originally intended to make a short animated film about the story and he had previously created a sculpture, life size cow (200*85*95 cm) entitled Pixelated Intifada made of 58.000 wooden cube commenting on the same story in 2012. The Wanted 18 was named Best Documentary from the Arab World at the 2014 Abu Dhabi Film Festival., the Best Documentary at Carthage Film Festival.

On October 3, 2023, The Palestinian Museum announced Shomali as the new General Director of the museum.
