= The Palestinian Museum =

Palestinian museum, located in Birzeit, West Bank, Palestine

- المتحف الفلسطيني
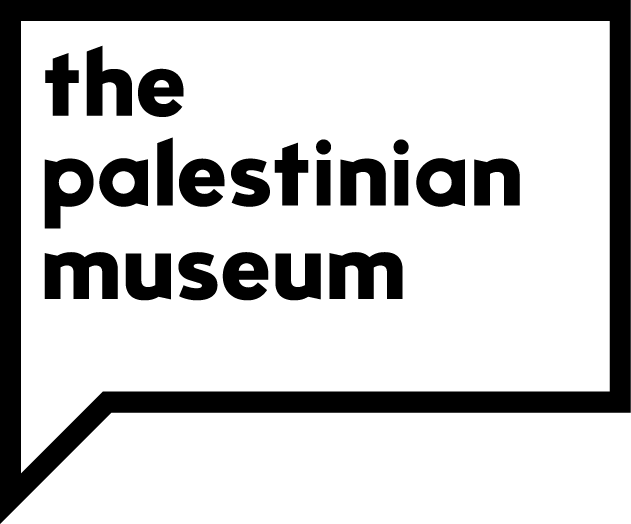

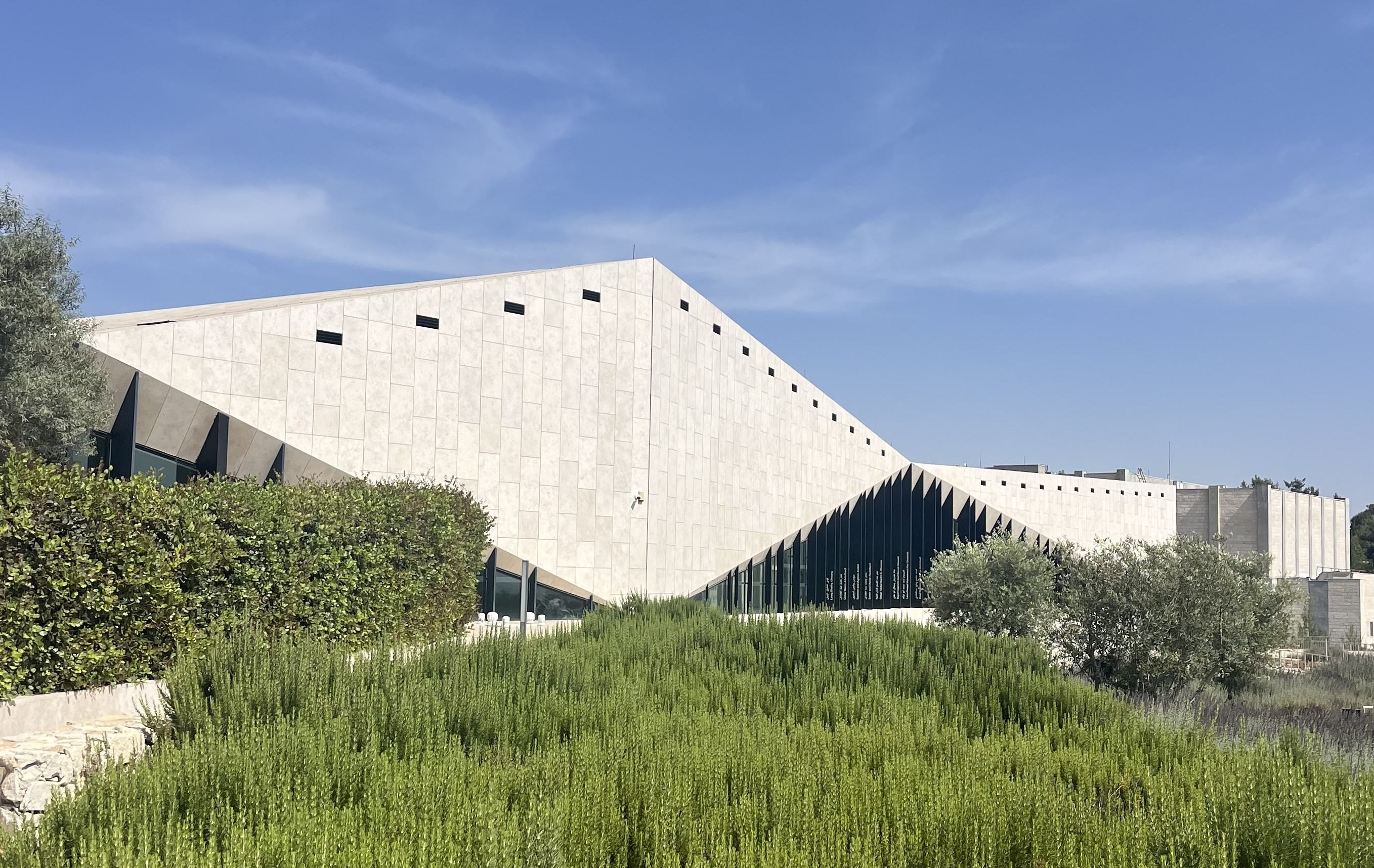
- Established: 18 May 2016; 10 years ago
- Location: Birzeit, West Bank, Palestine
- Coordinates: 31°57′46.69″N 35°11′0.42″E
- Type: Art and history museum
- Director: Amer Shomali
- Website: palmuseum.org/en

The Palestinian Museum is a museum in Birzeit, in the West Bank, Palestine, that was inaugurated on 18 May 2016. It is a flagship project of the Welfare Association (Taawon), a non-profit organization for developing humanitarian projects in Palestine. Representing the history and aspirations of the Palestinian people, the museum aims to discuss the past, present, and future of Palestine.

The museum building is located 25 km north of Jerusalem. The inaugural exhibition, "Jerusalem Lives", was opened on 26 August 2017.

On 29 August 2019, the museum received the Aga Khan Award for Architecture.

== Museum without borders ==
Representing the history and aspirations of the Palestinian people, the Palestinian Museum aims to discuss the past, present, and future of Palestine. The museum's research programs develop knowledge that is relevant inside and outside Palestine. Through its digital platforms and international partners, the museum aims to connect with about 10 million Palestinians^{[5]} scattered around the world, and with all those interested in Palestine.

The museum aims to transcend political and geographical borders, and address the mobility issues due to the Israeli–Palestinian conflict. Through local, regional and international partnerships and affiliate centers, the museum seeks to connect Palestinians worldwide. With an extensive network of partnerships within the region, it hopes to act as a hub for cultural activity there.

== History ==
The idea of developing a museum was initiated in 1997 by the London-based Welfare Association to commemorate the Nakba, and later developed to a broader viewpoint to documenting Palestinian history, society, art and culture from the beginning of the 19th century.

"It is not necessarily to start or stop at the Nakba, but nevertheless to look at Palestinians before that and after that … take that history and that memory as a means to reflect on what's happening today and as a way to think through ideas, concepts and propositions for the future." Jack Persekian, former director of the Palestinian Museum.

In May 2016, it was announced that Mahmoud Hawari would succeed Jack Persekian as director, who was ousted by the board after three and a half years. Writer and academic Dr. Adila Laïdi-Hanieh was appointed as Director General in September 2018. She developed the first five years programs strategy of the museum, and established two new departments focusing on curating, and on research and knowledge programming. She led the museum's COVID-19 lockdown programming in 2020, that enabled it to increase and continue providing its activities online without interruption, while diversifying its audiences. In 2022 the museum received a grant from the Aliph Foundation to establish a textile conservation studio – the first in Palestine – in collaboration with the UK's Victoria and Albert Museum. On October 3, 2023, the museum board announced interdisciplinary visual artist Amer Shomali as the new General Director.

== Architecture ==
The architectural firm responsible for the building was Heneghan Peng, who designed the Grand Egyptian Museum. The building offers a combination of exhibition spaces, research facilities and classrooms. Through its digital platforms and international partners, the museum seeks to connect with about 10 million Palestinians^{[5]} scattered around the world, and with all those interested in Palestine.

The Palestinian Museum is notable as a winner of the 2019 Aga Khan Award for Architecture. When it was shortlisted for the award earlier in the year, the museum was noted for marrying an aesthetically pleasing design with environmental responsibility.

Located atop a terraced hill, the museum building overlooks the Mediterranean. With a design inspired by the surrounding rural landscape, the building integrates seamlessly into its environment. The building's facade is made of local limestone and its cascading gardens represent the history of Palestinian vegetation and agriculture.

Builders laid terraces by hand, incorporating artisanal knowledge and skill. Outdoor garden spaces extend interior spaces to facilitate outdoor exhibitions and blend the building with its environment. The building's interior contains galleries, educational and research facilities, and administrative offices.

The museum's sustainable construction earned it LEED Gold certification. The building design and operations take sustainability into account. To reach LEED standards, the builders needed to implement systems control technologies that were new to the area's building industry.

The museum building is built on nearly ten acres of land donated by Birzeit University near Ramallah, and the cost of the building is estimated at US $24 to $30 million. Funds were contributed by "over 30 private Palestinian families and institutions", including the A. M. Qattan Foundation, the Bank of Palestine (privately owned), and the Arab Fund for Social and Economic Development.

The museum was inaugurated by Mahmoud Abbas on 18 May 2016, but it was "plagued by a series of cost overruns and delays", with some blaming Israel Customs authorities for those delays.

== Exhibitions ==
- Labour of Love: New Approaches to Palestinian Embroidery (2018)
- Intimate Terrains (2019)
- Glimmer of a Grove Beyond (2020)
- A People by the Sea: Narratives of the Palestinian Coast

In addition, the Palestinian Museum also hosts an online archive featuring 419 collections, 147,453 archival resources, and a total of 363,574 digitized items as of March 2025. The archive contains photographs, illustrations, diaries, maps, films, audio, and other media.

== Directors ==
- Jack Persekian (2012/13 - 2016)
- Mahmoud Hawari (2016-2018)
- Adila Laïdi-Hanieh (2018–23)
- Amer Shomali (2023 on)

== See also ==
- List of museums in the State of Palestine
- List of Palestinian artists
