= Khalil Sakakini Cultural Center =

Cultural center in Ramallah, Palestine

Coordinates: 31°53′55.05″N 35°12′6.46″E

Khalil Sakakini Cultural Center مركز خليل السكاكيني الثقافي
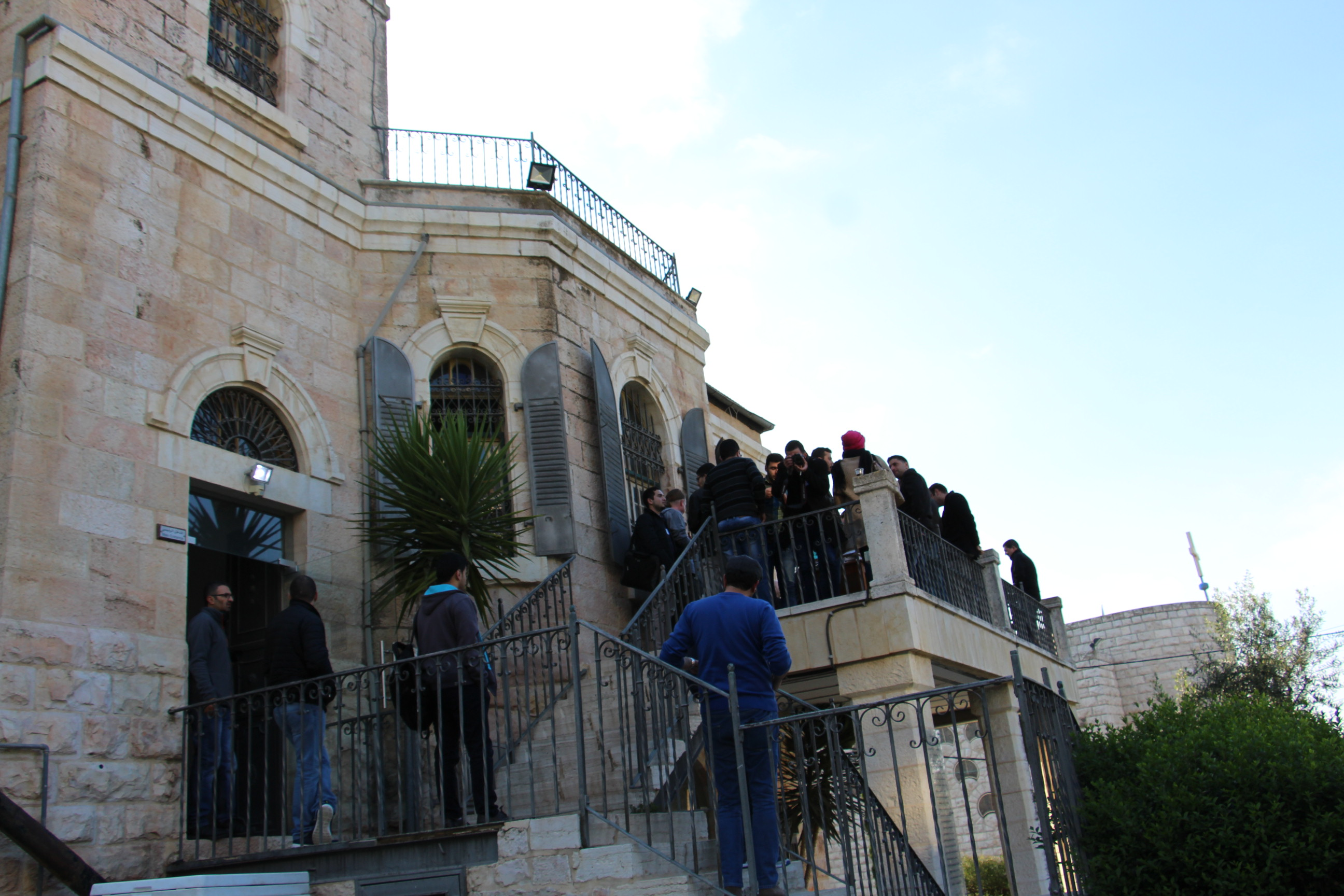
- Founded: 1996
- Type: Non-profit
- Location: Ramallah, Palestine
- Region served: Arts and Cultural
- Key people: Yazan Khalili (Director) Alhareth Rayyan (Programs manager)
- Website: http://www.sakakini.org

Khalil Sakakini Cultural Center (Arabic: مركز خليل السكاكيني الثقافي) is a Palestinian arts and culture organization that aims to create a pluralistic, critical liberating culture through research, query, and participation, and that provides an open space for the community to produce vibrant and liberating cultural content. Located in Ramallah, KSCC is housed in a renovated building, dating back to the early 20th century, based on traditional Palestinian architecture. Initially established in May 1996 as a branch of the Palestinian Ministry of Culture, KSCC was registered as a non-profit non-governmental organization (NGO) in 1998. The center is named after the Jerusalemite scholar, poet, and nationalist, Khalil Sakakini.

The centre holds art exhibits, book readings, poetry readings, children's activities and film screenings. Additionally to long term projects KSCC has also transferred some of its activities to facilities outside Ramallah, such as to Birzeit, Gaza City, and Bethlehem, to enable continuation of the projects during Israeli imposed curfews.

Adila Laïdi-Hanieh was the first director of the centre between 1996 and 2005. Yazan Khalili has been the director since 2015.

== See also ==
- Khalil al-Sakakini
- Palestinian Heritage Center
