= Ruangrupa =

Indonesian art collective

Ruangrupa, stylised as ruangrupa and abbreviated as ruru, is a contemporary art collective based in Jakarta, Indonesia. Founded in 2000 by a group of seven artists, ruangrupa provided a platform in South Jakarta for organising exhibitions, events, and festivals, also conducting publishing services, workshops, and research.

Ruangrupa functions as a non-profit organisation that supports contemporary art within the urban and cultural contexts of Indonesia and beyond, often involving artists and practitioners from other disciplines such as the social sciences, politics, and technology. The collective also supports the development of video art through research, documentation, and their biennial video art festival, OK Video, first held in July 2003.

As a collective, they co-directed documenta fifteen, which took place 2022 in Kassel, Germany; notably the first Asian group and the first art collective to curate the large-scale international exhibition. While the collective has no fixed number of members, ten of the group's core members engaged in the directorship role, including director Ade Darmawan, Ajeng Nurul Aini, Daniella Fitria Praptono, Farid Rakun, Indra Ameng, Iswanto Hartono, Julia Sarisetiati, Mirwan Andan, Narpati Awangga, and Reza Afisina.

In 2022, ruangrupa topped the ArtReview Power 100 list for their defense of artistic freedom amidst the controversies of documenta fifteen, as well as their influential mode of nonhierarchical working that continues to inspire ongoing collaborations across the art world.

== History ==
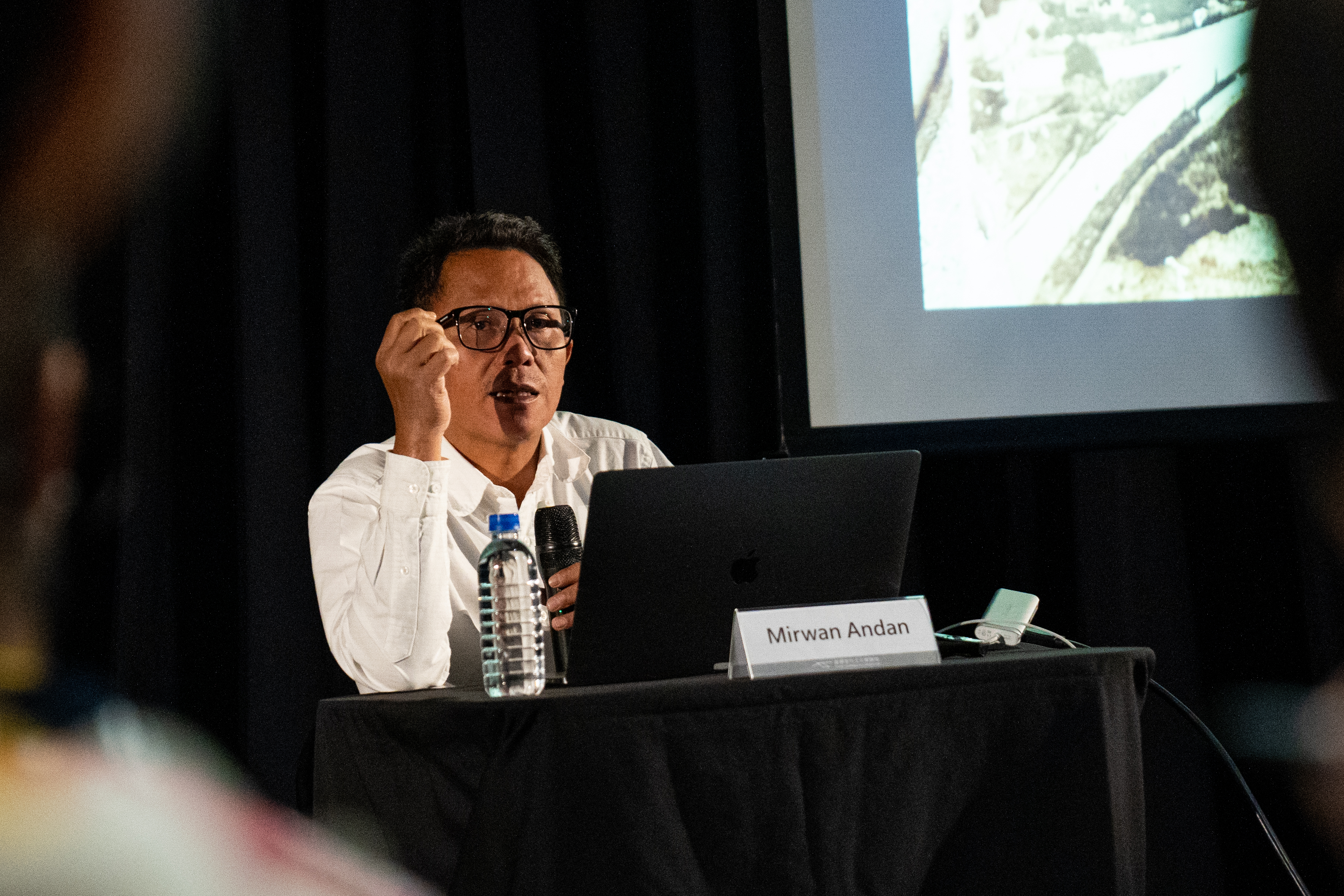
Mirwan Andan

Loosely translated from the Indonesian language to mean "a space for art" or "a space form", ruangrupa was founded in 2000 by artists seeking to create much-needed space where artists could work intensively with an emphasis on critical analysis, rather than production. Established two years after the fall of the authoritarian Suharto regime, the collective notably emerged at a moment of newfound freedom for Indonesia. ruangrupa is also a part of the Ford Foundation and Arts Collaboratory organisation network, receiving financial support from these networks.

In July 2003, the collective held their first biennial video art festival, OK Video, to support the development of video art through research and documentation.

Since its founding, ruangrupa has changed its format and organisational structure twice. In 2015, ruangrupa developed the cultural platform Gudang Sarinah Ekosistem (GSE) together with a number of art collectives in Jakarta, an interdisciplinary space seeking to support creatives, communities, and institutions. The platform takes its name from Gudang Sarinah, their new headquarters located in Pancoran, South Jakarta. In 2018, together with two other Jakarta-based art collectives, Serrum and Grafis Huru Hara, ruangrupa initiated GUDSKUL: Contemporary Art Collective and Ecosystem Studies, a public learning space.

== documenta fifteen ==
=== Curatorial concept ===
In 2019, it was announced that ruangrupa would serve as artistic director for documenta fifteen collectively, the first time an Asian group or an art collective would curate the large-scale, international exhibition, particularly from the Global South.

The curatorial concept prepared by ruangrupa for documenta fifteen centres upon the notion of lumbung, a rice barn that stores the communally-produced common resource of rice for future use. Documenta fifteen is thus conceived as a collective resource pot, operating under the logics of the commons to mend today's injuries that are rooted in colonialism, capitalism, and patriarchy; echoing the original intent of Documenta, an event launched to heal European war wounds. The curatorial approach involved the invitation of an international network of localised, community-based art organisations, including groups such as Black Quantum Futurism, Nha San Collective, and Asia Art Archive.

=== Controversies ===
In January 2022, five months before documenta fifteen opened, factually inaccurate claims of ties to the Boycott, Divestment and Sanctions (BDS) movement were leveled against Documenta by the blog, Alliance Against Anti-Semitism Kassel, due to ruangrupa's inclusion of the Palestinian art collective The Question of Funding. Despite factual inaccuracies in the blog post, major German and Israeli media outlets picked up on and circulated accusations of antisemitism.

Refuting the claims, ruangrupa attempted opening up dialogue by organizing the forum "We Need to Talk! Art, Freedom and Solidarity," a series of talks meant to take place across 8, 15, and 22 May 2022 to address the "fundamental right of artistic freedom in the face of antisemitism, racism and Islamophobia."

On 4 May 2022, the forum was cancelled after Josef Schuster, president of the Central Council of Jews in Germany, addressed the event in a letter to Claudia Roth, Germany’s state minister for culture and media, leading ruangrupa and several panellists to believe that free and productive discussion would not be possible.

In April 2022, multiple anti-Muslim stickers were found outside the ruruHaus exhibition venue with slogans like “Freedom Not Islam!” "No Compromise with Barbarism!" and "Fight Islam Consistently!" On 27 May 2022, a month before the opening, The Question of Funding's exhibition venue in Kassel was broken into and vandalized, which ruangrupa filed a criminal complaint for. Phrases such as "PERALTA" were spray-painted on walls, an alleged reference to Isabel Medina Peralta, the leader of a Spanish far-right youth group who previously faced charges for inciting violence against Muslims. On 2 June 2022, artists and organizers involved with documenta fifteen issued a statement of support for ruangrupa, stating that the collective was erroneously accused of antisemitism.

Days after the 18 June 2022 opening of documenta fifteen, a mural titled People's Justice (2002) by the Indonesian group Taring Padi came under intense controversy over what the German and Israeli governments condemned as antisemitic imagery, and the mural was subsequently covered up and taken down, sparking major political, artistic, and social debates in Germany. Originally collaboratively created in Yogyakarta, Indonesia in 2002, the mural illustrates Indonesian politics as a battle of the people against oppressors, capitalists, and polluters. The mural is a critique of Suharto's military dictatorship and the complex power relationships that sustained it, with a section depicting the involvement of the government of Israel through the use of Jewish caricatures.

The artists and ruangrupa apologized for the use of stereotype in the artwork, while denouncing antisemitism and discrimination in any form. Israeli media outlets reported on the controversy as a scandal, framing Documenta as having ignored earlier accusations of antisemitism, and accusing ruangrupa of antisemitic attitudes. Jörg Sperling, chairman of the Documenta-Forum, criticized the removal of the mural, identifying the work's connection to the broader historical context of the Israel-Palestine conflict, later stepping down from his chairman position. Sabine Schormann, general director of the documenta fifteen, later announced her resignation after initial resistance to stepping down.

By August 2022, a "scientific advisory panel" was appointed by the Supervisory Board of Documenta to review artworks in documenta fifteen on the basis of antisemitism, despite vigorous opposition from ruangrupa, who spoke out against the censorship of artworks. After the preliminary findings of the advisory panel argued that Documenta "allowed an anti-Zionist, anti-Semitic and anti-Israeli mood to prevail," an open letter titled "We are angry, we are sad, we are tired, we are united," was published on 10 September 2022, co-signed by ruangrupa and 65 participating artists from documenta fifteen. The letter highlighted the continued harassment and discrimination faced by ruangrupa and documenta fifteen artists, speaking out against the methods and claims of the advisory panel as pseudoscientific, racist, and Eurocentric, "a way of projecting onto and transposing German guilt and history into the Palestinian and other anti-colonial struggles."

In November 2022, ruangrupa topped the ArtReview Power 100 list for their defense of artistic freedom amidst the controversies of documenta fifteen, as well as their influential mode of nonhierarchical working that continues to inspire ongoing collaborations across the art world.

Scrutiny continues to be placed upon ruangrupa, with the investigation findings released in January 2023 claiming that documenta fifteen "served as an echo chamber for Israel-related antisemitism and sometimes pure antisemitism."

By 17 November 2023, amidst the escalating conflict in Israel and Palestine, the entire Documenta 16 selection committee collectively resigned after accusations of antisemitism for committee members' support of the BDS movement. In their resignation letter, they state:

"In the current circumstances we do not believe that there is a space in Germany for an open exchange of ideas and the development of complex and nuanced artistic approaches that documenta artists and curators deserve."

== Publications ==
- The Collective Eye/ Emma Nilsson, Dominique Lucien Garaudel, Heinz-Norbert Jocks (Edit): The Collective Eye in conversation with ruangrupa—Thoughts on Collective Practice, ISBN 978-3-95476-466-2

== Major exhibitions and projects ==
Year	Title	Type	Location
2001	ruangrupa joins the Rain Artists' Initiatives Network (RAIN)	-	-
July 2003	OK Video	Biennial video art festival	National Gallery of Indonesia, Jakarta
2008	Oberhausen – International Short Film Festival	Special screening program	Oberhausen, Germany
2010	Singapore Night Festival	Exhibition	Singapore Art Museum, Singapore
2010	DECOMPRESSION#10 – Expanding The Space and Public	Public art project exhibition, workshop, film screening, seminar, bazaar, music festival, and publication launches to commemorate ruangrupa's 10th birthday	Jakarta, Bandung, and Yogyakarta, Indonesia
2011	The Singapore Fiction	Exhibition	Singapore Biennale, National Museum of Singapore, Singapore
2012	THE KUDA: The Untold Story of Indonesian Underground Music in the 70s	Exhibition (commissioned)	The 7th Asia Pacific Triennial of Contemporary Art (APT7), QAGOMA, Brisbane, Australia
2012	The Sweet and Sour Story of Sugar	Exhibition and collaboration project with Noorderlicht, Netherlands	Galeri Kuntskring,[Jakarta, Indonesia
2016	SONSBEEK '16: transACTION	Curator	Park Sonsbeek dan Museum Arnhem, Arnhem, Netherlands
2016	OK: Food, OK. Video 2017 in "Food Today: Indonesian Food, Society and Media Art"	Archive exhibition	Asia Culture Center, Gwangju, South Korea
2019	Speculative Collective	Exhibition as Gudskul	14th Sharjah Biennial, Sharjah, United Arab Emirates
2022	documenta fifteen	Artistic director	Kassel, Germany
