= UGATLahi Artist Collective =

UGATLAHI's Official Logo was lifted from a photograph of a boy from an urban poor community holding a huge papier-mâché mask in one of UGATLahi's community workshops.

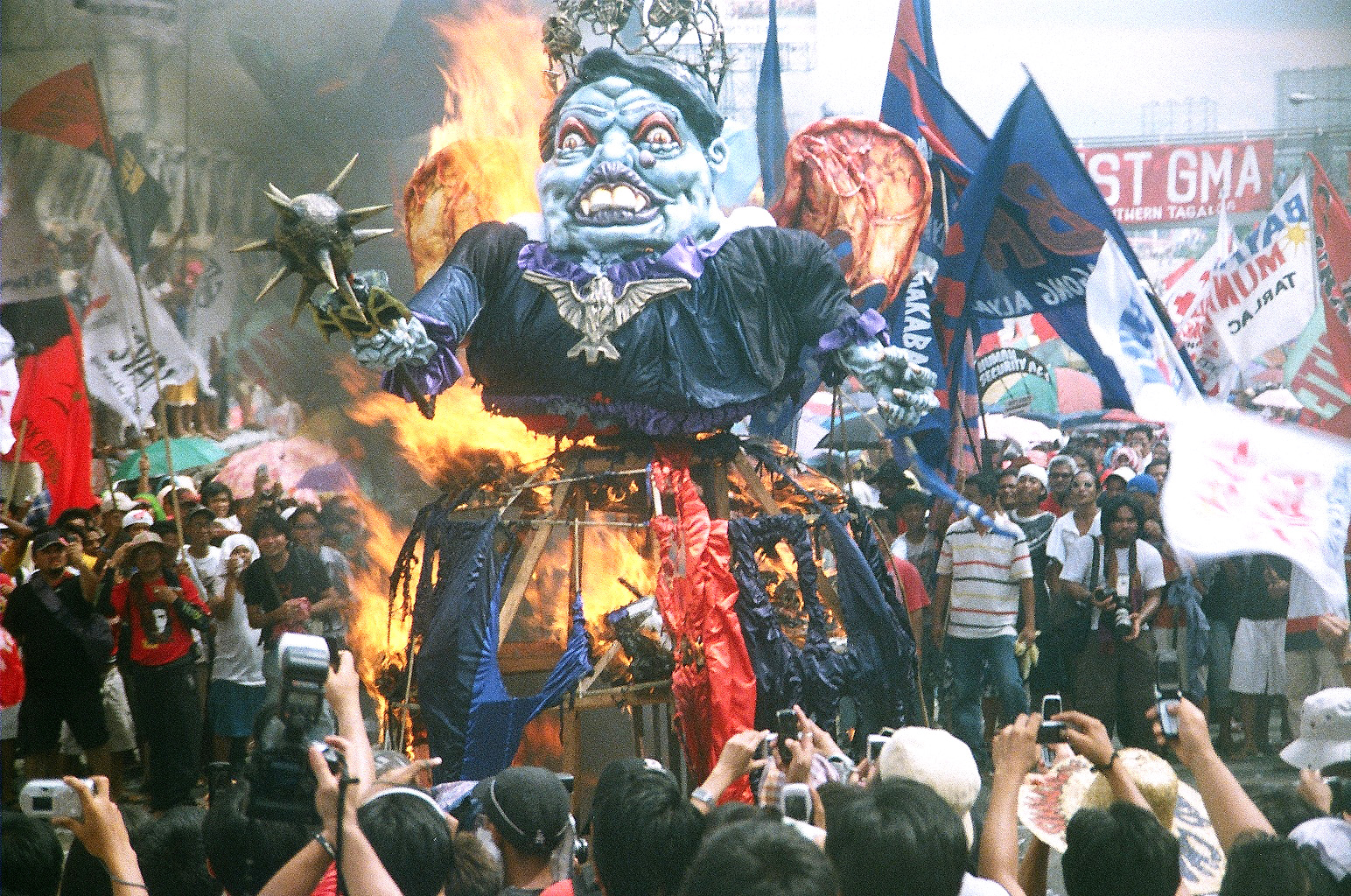
An effigy, created by the UGATLahi Artist Collective, is set aflame by protesters at an anti-government rally held along Commonwealth avenue during the 2007 State of the Nation Address (SONA) by Philippine President Gloria Macapagal-Arroyo.

UGATLahi Artist Collective is a visual artists' organization based in the Philippines. The group was started in the early 1990s. The group creates images of protest. Since 2001, they have created effigies of the Philippine president for each State of the Nation Address. The group is also active in performance and installation art.

Most UGATLahi artists are often nicknamed as 'artists of social conscience'.

== Formation ==
In 1992, UGATLahi Artist Collective was formed in response to the growing concerns of Filipino students regarding the role of culture and the visual arts in nation-building. Initially, UGATLahi was a multi-disciplinary arts collective, which later evolved into an organization focusing on the visual arts.

== Principles and Practices ==
UGATLahi believes that art and culture has a big role in giving voice to the marginalized social sectors. It supports cultural initiatives from these sectors, helping to develop their potential to recognize and realize their role in the country's future.

It urges the campaign for a nationalist culture through engaging in projects and collaborations with other art groups by helping to organize and support the struggles of workers and urban poor communities throughout the country's National Capital Region.

Most of the group's significant works were made during the Oust Erap campaign in the year 2000, where murals and papier-mâché effigies were created and displayed during rallies, peoples’ assemblies and in picket lines.

UGATLahi seeks to promote awareness of human rights. In 2010, after the hostage taking incident in Manila, the group called for swift justice for those responsible for the incident.

A year after the Maguindanao massacre, the group constructed an effigy of the prime suspects in the killing riding a backhoe.

== Influences ==
UGATLahi's influences include notable art collectives such as Bread and Puppet and Taring Padi, an Indonesian art collective which also explores political art.

== Student Involvement ==
Though universities are not directly involved with UGATLahi, a lot of students from prestigious universities in the Philippines such as the University of the Philippines, University of Santo Tomas, and Adamson University have closely collaborated with this group.

== Effigies ==
- In 2011, Ugatlahi constructed Philippines' president Noynoy Aquino's second effigy, which resembled a gigantic rotten egg atop a military humvee.
- In 2010, Ugatlahi created the very first effigy that was not burned. It was a 14 feet by 15 feet effigy of the newly elected president Benigno "Noynoy" Aquino III. The group portrayed the Philippine president as a magician conjuring illusions."
- In 2009, Ugatlahi had created the largest and bulkiest effigy of former president Gloria Macapagal Arroyo which was around 11 feet long and 10 feet wide. According to the Bagong Alyansang Makabayan (Bayan), Arroyo’s “Gloria Forever” effigy portrayed her desire to stay in power."
- In 2008, they created a 21 foot tall effigy that portrayed a sinking ship and President Arroyo on an airplane.
- Early 1990s, Ugatlahi has started facilitating this effigy burning since president Joseph Estrada's term. They have worked closely with the activist group, BAYAN.

== Collaborations ==
UGATLahi links up with other artists initiative such as TutoK. UGATLahi regularly performs at NeoAngono's annual Public Art Festival.

== Giving Back ==
UGATLahi is also involved in some humanitarian activities with fellow artist groups such as:

- Sagip Sining Art 2 D Rescue - a fundraising activity to help typhoon victims.
- Asia Focus - a mural project addressing violence in a creative context.

== See also ==
- Artist collective
- Protest art
