= Documenta fifteen =

2022 art exhibition in Kassel, Germany

documenta fifteen
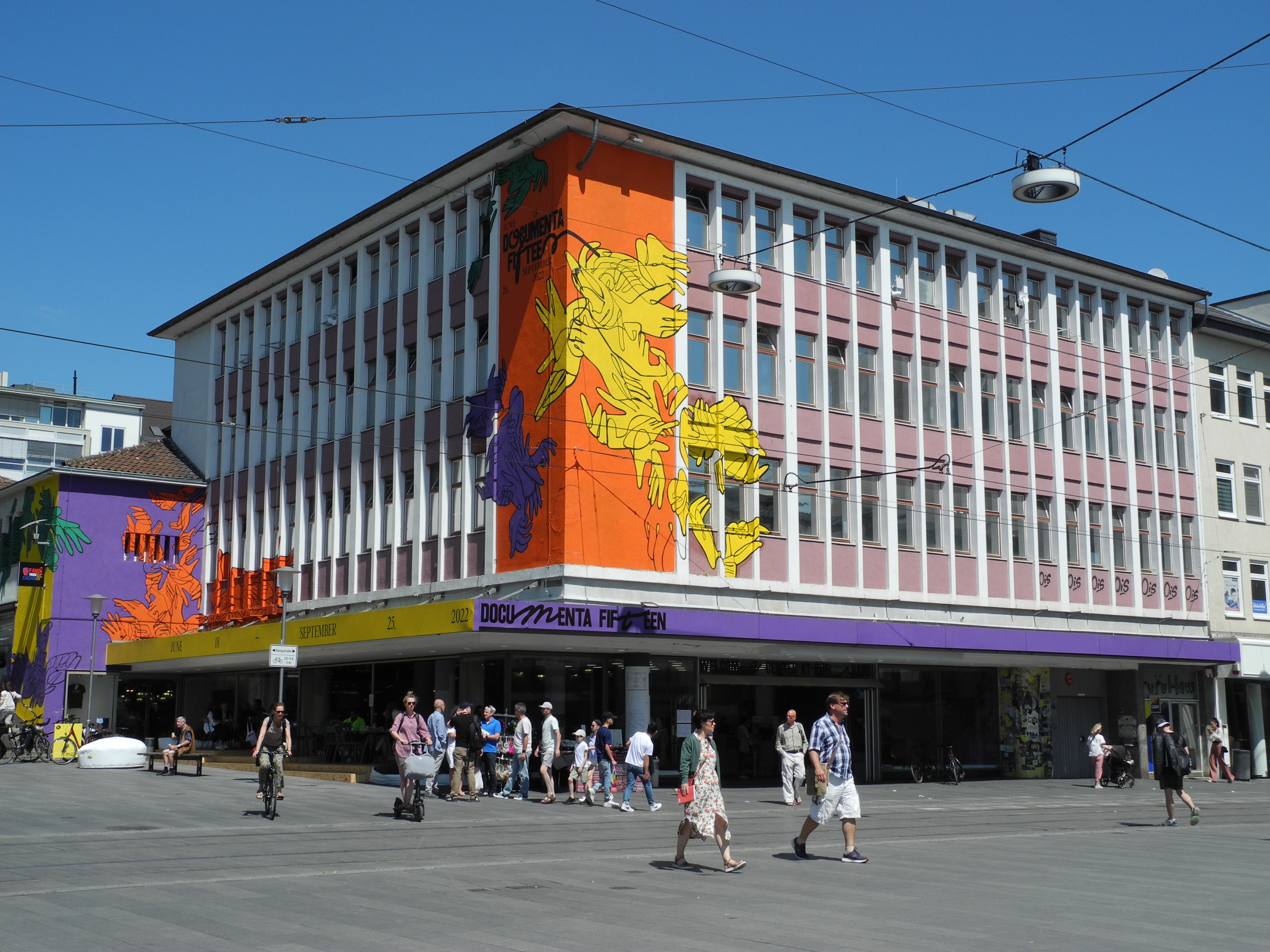
- ruruHaus, the documenta fifteen Visitor Center, in Kassel, Hesse, Germany.
- Genre: Art exhibition
- Begins: 18 June 2022
- Ends: 25 September 2022
- Location: Kassel
- Country: Germany
- Previous event: documenta 14 (2017)

Documenta fifteen, stylized as documenta fifteen, is the 15th edition of Documenta, a major international contemporary art exhibition held every five years in Kassel, Germany.

The Indonesian art collective ruangrupa served as artistic director for documenta fifteen collectively, the first time an Asian group or an art collective would curate the large-scale, international exhibition, particularly from the Global South.

The curatorial concept centers upon the notion of lumbung, a rice barn that stores the communally-produced common resource of rice for future use. This involved the invitation of an international network of localized, community-based art organizations.

== Planning and concept ==
It was announced in 2019 that Indonesian art collective ruangrupa would serve as documenta fifteen's artistic director. It would be the first time an Asian group or an art collective would curate the large-scale, international exhibition, particularly from the Global South.

The curatorial concept prepared by ruangrupa for documenta fifteen centers upon the notion of lumbung, a rice barn that stores the communally-produced common resource of rice for future use. Documenta fifteen is thus conceived as a collective resource pot, operating under the logics of the commons to mend today's injuries that are rooted in colonialism, capitalism, and patriarchy; echoing the original intent of Documenta, an event launched to heal European war wounds. The curatorial approach involved the invitation of an international network of localized, community-based art organizations, including groups such as Black Quantum Futurism, Nhà Sàn Collective, and Asia Art Archive.

Initially, a postponement to 2023 due to the COVID-19 pandemic was considered in 2021, though it was eventually decided that documenta fifteen would continue to run in 2022 from 8 June to 25 September.

== Participants ==
=== * ===
- *foundationClass* collective

=== A ===
- Agus Nur Amal PMTOH
- Alice Yard
- Amol K Patil
- Another Roadmap Africa Cluster (ARAC)
- Archives des luttes des femmes en Algérie
- Arts Collaboratory
- Asia Art Archive (AAA)
- Atis Rezistans | Ghetto Biennale

=== B ===
- Baan Noorg Collaborative Arts and Culture
- Black Quantum Futurism
- BOLOHO
- Britto Arts Trust

=== C ===
- Cao Minghao & Chen Jianjun
- Centre d’art Waza
- Chang En-Man
- Chimurenga
- Cinema Caravan & Takashi Kuribayashi

=== D ===
- Dan Perjovschi

=== E ===
- El Warcha
- Erick Beltrán

=== F ===
- FAFSWAG
- Fehras Publishing Practices
- Fondation Festival sur le Niger

=== G ===
- Graziela Kunsch
- Gudskul

=== H ===
- Hamja Ahsan

=== I ===
- ikkibawiKrrr
- INLAND
- Instituto de Artivismo Hannah Arendt

=== J ===
- Jatiwangi art Factory (JaF)
- Jimmie Durham (1940–2021)
- Jumana Emil Abboud

=== K ===
- Keleketla! Library
- Kiri Dalena
- Komîna Fîlm a Rojava (Rojava Film Commune)

=== L ===
- La Intermundial Holobiente
- LE 18

=== M ===
- MADEYOULOOK
- Marwa Arsanios
- Más Arte Más Acción (MAMA)
- Mukenge/Schellhammer

=== N ===
- Nguyễn Trinh Thi
- Nhà Sàn Collective (NSC)
- Nino Bulling

=== O ===
- OFF-Biennale Budapest
- ook_reinaart vanhoe

=== P ===
- Party Office B2B Fadescha
- Pınar Öğrenci
- Project Art Works

=== R ===
- Richard Bell

=== S ===
- Sada [Regroup]
- Safdar Ahmed
- Saodat Ismailova
- Sa Sa Art Projects
- Serigrafistas queer
- Siwa Plateforme
- Station of Commons
- Sourabh Phadke
- Subversive Film

=== T ===
- Taring Padi
- The Black Archives
- The Question of Funding
- The Nest Collective
- Trampoline House

=== W ===
- Wajukuu Art Project
- Wakaliga Uganda

=== Y ===
- Yasmine Eid-Sabbagh

=== Z ===
- ZK/U – Center for Art and Urbanistics

== Controversies ==
=== Initial allegations ===
In January 2022, five months before documenta fifteen opened, incorrect claims of ties to the Boycott, Divestment and Sanctions (BDS) movement were leveled against Documenta by the blog, Alliance Against Anti-Semitism Kassel, due to ruangrupa's inclusion of the Palestinian art collective The Question of Funding. Despite factual inaccuracies in the blog post, major German and Israeli media outlets picked up on and circulated accusations of antisemitism. German law bars the use of federal funds for groups with ties to the BDS movement, which is a global campaign calling for economic sanctions against Israeli goods and initiatives.

Refuting the claims, ruangrupa attempted opening up dialogue by organizing the forum "We Need to Talk! Art, Freedom and Solidarity," a series of talks meant to take place across 8, 15, and 22 May 2022 to address the "fundamental right of artistic freedom in the face of antisemitism, racism and Islamophobia." The talks would have featured figures such as Israeli author Omri Boehm; Marina Chernivsky, an anti-Semitism scholar and the German government’s commissioner for Jewish life; German curator Anselm Franke; and Israeli-born architect Eyal Weizman, founder of the group Forensic Architecture.

On 4 May 2022, the forum was cancelled after Josef Schuster, president of the Central Council of Jews in Germany, addressed the event in a letter to Claudia Roth, Germany’s state minister for culture and media, leading ruangrupa and several panellists to believe that free and productive discussion would not be possible.

=== Vandalism of exhibition venues ===
In April 2022, multiple anti-Muslim stickers were found outside the ruruHaus exhibition venue. These stickers included slogans like “Freedom Not Islam!” "No Compromise with Barbarism!" and "Fight Islam Consistently!"

On 27 May 2022, a month before the opening, The Question of Funding's exhibition venue in Kassel was broken into and vandalized. Phrases spray-painted on walls included "187" and "PERALTA," the "187" an alleged reference to the Penal Code of California for the crime of murder, and "PERALTA" an alleged reference to Isabel Medina Peralta, the leader of a Spanish far-right youth group who previously faced charges for inciting violence against Muslims.

Documenta filed a criminal complaint with the city of Kassel following the vandalism, and artists and organizers involved with documenta fifteen issued a statement of support for ruangrupa. The statement claimed that the collective was erroneously accused of antisemitism.

=== Mural controversy ===
Days after the 18 June 2022 opening of documenta fifteen, a mural titled People's Justice (2002) by the Indonesian artist group Taring Padi came under intense controversy over what the German and Israeli governments condemned as antisemitic imagery, and the mural was subsequently covered up and taken down, sparking major political, artistic, and social debates in Germany. Originally collaboratively created in Yogyakarta, Indonesia in 2002, the mural illustrates Indonesian politics as a battle of the people against oppressors, capitalists, and polluters. The mural is a critique of Suharto's military dictatorship and the complex power relationships that sustained it, with a section depicting the involvement of the government of Israel through the use of Jewish caricatures. These figures included a soldier with a pig's face and a Star of David, as well as a man with sidecurls, sharp teeth and SS runes on his hat. Some of these figures have been identified as Jewish, Islamic, or American statesmen involved in colonial wars, support of the 1965 genocide and the occupation of East Timor, acts of terrorism, or economic exploitation of Indonesia and Irian, e.g. Henry Kissinger.

The artists and ruangrupa apologized for the use of stereotype in the artwork, while denouncing antisemitism and discrimination in any form. Israeli and German media outlets reported on the controversy as a scandal, framing Documenta as having ignored earlier warnings by the Central Council of Jews in Germany, and accusing ruangrupa of antisemitic attitudes.

Claudia Roth, Federal Government Commissioner for Culture and the Media, declared in an official statement that its removal was "overdue" and "is only a first step." Jörg Sperling, chairman of the Documenta-Forum, criticized the taking-down of the mural, connecting the work to the historical context of the Israel-Palestine conflict, a "subject that lies outside of art" and that Documenta could not solve. He later stepped back from his position as chairman of the Documenta-Forum. Sabine Schormann, general director of the documenta fifteen, resigned on 17 July 2022 after initial resistance to stepping down.

The controversy triggered a debate as to whether the Documenta itself should have a future. German President Frank-Walter Steinmeier (SPD) said at the show's official opening, "there are limits” to what artists can do when they address political issues. He declared: “As justified as some criticism of Israeli policies, such as the building of settlements, is, recognizing Israeli statehood means recognizing the dignity and security of the modern Jewish community.” Steinmeier pointed out that the Documenta management should not "outsource their responsibility to the Indonesian curators", but instead should take on the role of mediators and “create appropriate structures" for debate. Federal Chancellor Olaf Scholz (SPD) demonstratively announced that he would stay away from the Documenta this year. Art professor Bazon Brock commented about the failure of the Documenta management during a radio interview hosted by the German public broadcaster Deutschlandfunk: "People liquidated art in the name of artistic freedom."

=== Scientific advisory panel ===
By August 2022, a "scientific advisory panel" was appointed by the Supervisory Board of Documenta to review artworks in documenta fifteen on the basis of antisemitism, despite vigorous opposition from ruangrupa, who spoke out against the censorship of artworks. After the preliminary findings of the advisory panel argued that Documenta "allowed an anti-Zionist, anti-Semitic and anti-Israeli mood to prevail," an open letter titled "We are angry, we are sad, we are tired, we are united," was published on 10 September 2022, co-signed by ruangrupa and 65 participating artists from documenta fifteen.

The letter highlighted the continued harassment and discrimination faced by ruangrupa and documenta fifteen artists, arguing that the methods and claims of the advisory panel were pseudoscientific, racist, and Eurocentric, "a way of projecting onto and transposing German guilt and history into the Palestinian and other anti-colonial struggles."

ruangrupa asserted that documenta fifteen featured many artists involved in grassroots movements who have struggled with and are still struggling with colonial regimes, with the Palestinian anti-colonial struggle emerging as a topic in many artworks because of the historical solidarities between anti-colonial struggles across the world.

== After documenta fifteen ==
documenta fifteen closed as planned on 25 September 2022, citing very good attendance figures.

In November 2022, ruangrupa topped the ArtReview Power 100 list for their defense of artistic freedom amidst the controversies of documenta fifteen, as well as their influential mode of nonhierarchical working that continues to inspire ongoing collaborations across the art world.

Scrutiny continues to be placed upon ruangrupa, with the investigation findings released in January 2023 claiming that documenta fifteen "served as an echo chamber for Israel-related antisemitism and sometimes pure antisemitism."

By 17 November 2023, amidst the escalating conflict in Israel and Palestine, the entire Documenta 16 selection committee collectively resigned after accusations of antisemitism for committee members' support of the BDS movement. In their resignation letter, they state:

"In the current circumstances we do not believe that there is a space in Germany for an open exchange of ideas and the development of complex and nuanced artistic approaches that documenta artists and curators deserve."
