= Hamja Ahsan =

English-born writer and activist (born 1981)

- Born: 17 March 1981 (age 45); London, England
- Education: Central St. Martins, Chelsea College of Art
- Notable work: Shy Radicals: Anti-systemic politics of the militant introvert
- Awards: Grand Prize 2019 Ljubiana Biennial of Graphic Arts

Hamja Ahsan (born 17 March 1981) is a radical left wing artist, writer, curator and activist. A multi-disciplinary artist, his practice has involved conceptual writing, building archives, performance, video, sound and making zines. His work explores state crime, contemporary Islamophobia, repression of civil liberties under the war on terror, and prison solidarity, among other themes.

Ahsan is the author of Shy Radicals: The Antisystemic Politics of the Militant Introvert, published by Book Works in 2017.

In 2019, he was awarded the Grand Prize at the thirty-third Ljubljana Biennial of Graphic Arts for the artwork "Aspergistan Referendum" based on Shy Radicals. Ahsan exhibited work at Documenta fifteen.

== Life ==
Ahsan was born in London in 1981 to Bengali Muslim parents. He grew up in Tooting and Mitcham and attended Graveney Secondary School. In 2005, Hamja attend Central St. Martin's and completed a BA Fine Art, receiving a first. He was taught by Anne Tallentire. He then completed an MA in Critical Writing and Curatorial Practice at Chelsea College of Arts.

He lives and works in London.

== Shy Radicals ==
In 2017, Ahsan's book Shy Radicals: The Antisystemic Politics of the Militant Introvert was published by Book Works. Shy Radicals is a work of speculative fiction that conjures a new structuring of the world defined by "extrovert supremacy" and a global resistance of shy and introvert activism. Ahsan has described the text as a manifesto for a Black Panther-like party for shy people. The book currently in its fourth edition.

Ahsan has been invited to do readings or teach modules on his work across the United Kingdom, Europe and North America, and the book has been taught in university classes on subjects such as neurodiversity (Brown University) and utopias (Queen Mary University of London.

In 2020, Shy Radicals was adapted into a short film, produced by Ridley Scott's Black Dog Films and directed by Tom Dream.

== Art and curatorial practice ==
Ahsan has been an artist, writer, curator and cultural organiser since the early 2000s.

He is the co-founder of the DIY Cultures Zine Festival in 2013. He has presented art projects at the NY Art Book Fair at MOMA PS1; Tate Modern, London; Gwangju Biennale; Shanaakht festival, Karachi; and Ujazdowski Castle Centre for Contemporary Art (CCA) in Warsaw and was a resident artist at Jan van Eyck Academie in Maastricht in 2020–21.

In 2019, he was awarded the Grand Prize at the thirty-third Ljubljana Biennial of Graphic Arts for the artwork 'Aspergistan Referendum' based on Shy Radicals. Ahsan was selected as a participating artist for Documenta fifteen.

Radical Chicken, his current project, is invested in a critical reading of fried chicken stalls and fried chicken as a critical object to understand spaces for community gathering globally.

== Activism ==
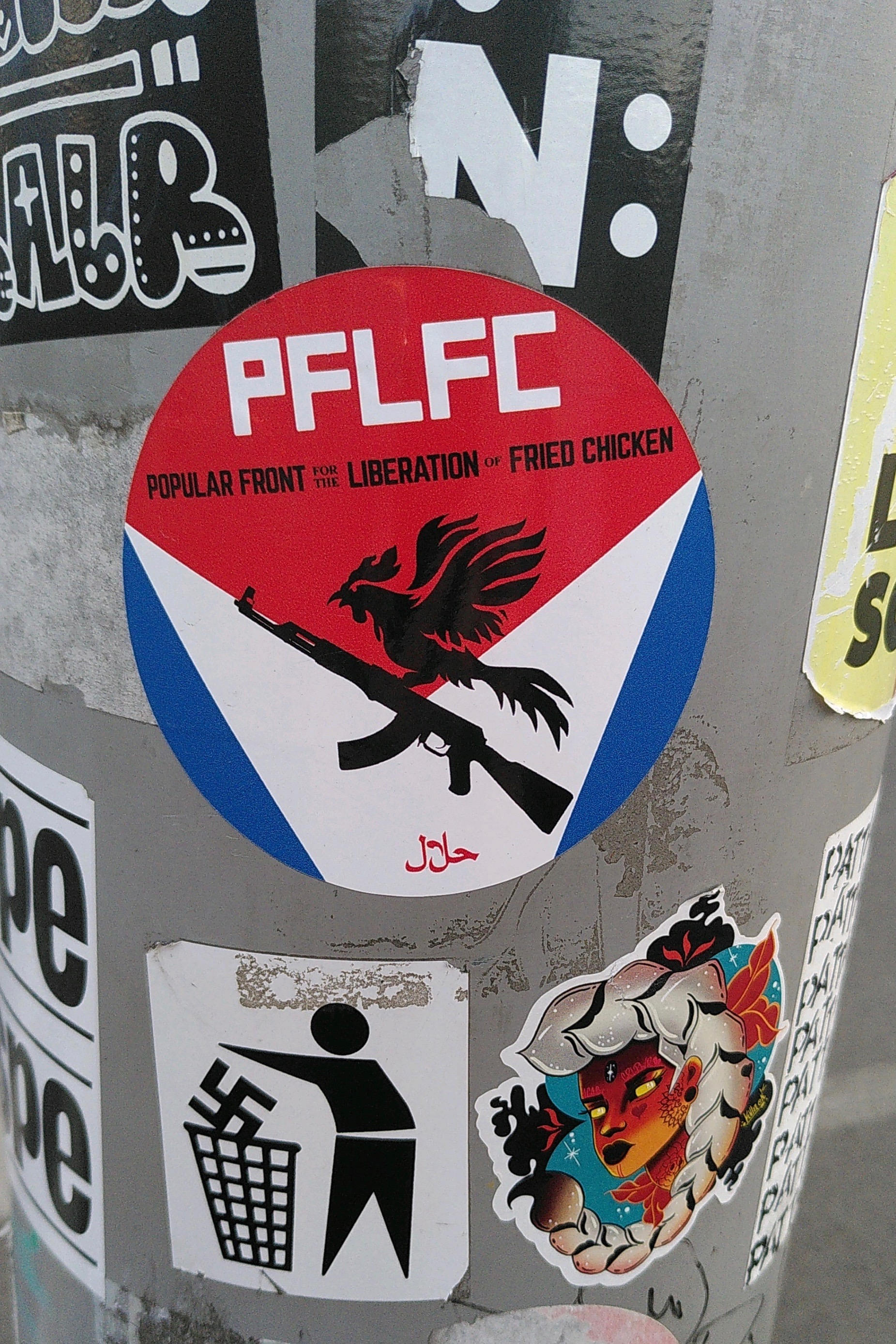
Sticker inscribed with "PFLFC - Popular Front for the Liberation of Fried Chicken", photographed in Brussels in June 2023.

Ahsan was a campaigner for the release of his brother, Syed Talha Ahsan, who was detained for over six years without a trial or charge. In 2012, he was shortlisted for the Liberty Human Rights award for the 'Free Talha Ahsan' campaign on extradition and detention without trial under the war on terror, highlighting the effective use of creative practice, art and film. The 'Free Talha' campaign received support from many figures across the world, including Riz Ahmed, Caroline Lucas and A.L Kennedy.

As both artist and campaigner, Ahsan has also championed various other causes that deal with state violence.

In 2022, Ahsan called German Chancellor Olaf Scholz a “neoliberal fascist pig” in a Facebook post. President of the German-Israeli Society (DIG), Volker Beck, then accused him of relativizing National Socialism. Ahsan's statement raised criticism in Germany and he was banned from Documenta fifteen. However, his works continued to be shown at the exhibition. His work has attracted criticism in the context of the Documenta fifteen anti-Semitism controversy, as one of the light boxes exhibited as part of his work is inscribed with "PFLFC - Popular Front for the Liberation of Fried Chicken", which alludes to the Popular Front for the Liberation of Palestine, classified as a terrorist organisation by the EU and the US.

Ahsan has supported the Palestine BDS campaign ever since Operation Cast Lead, which he described as a genocide.
