= Oomleo =

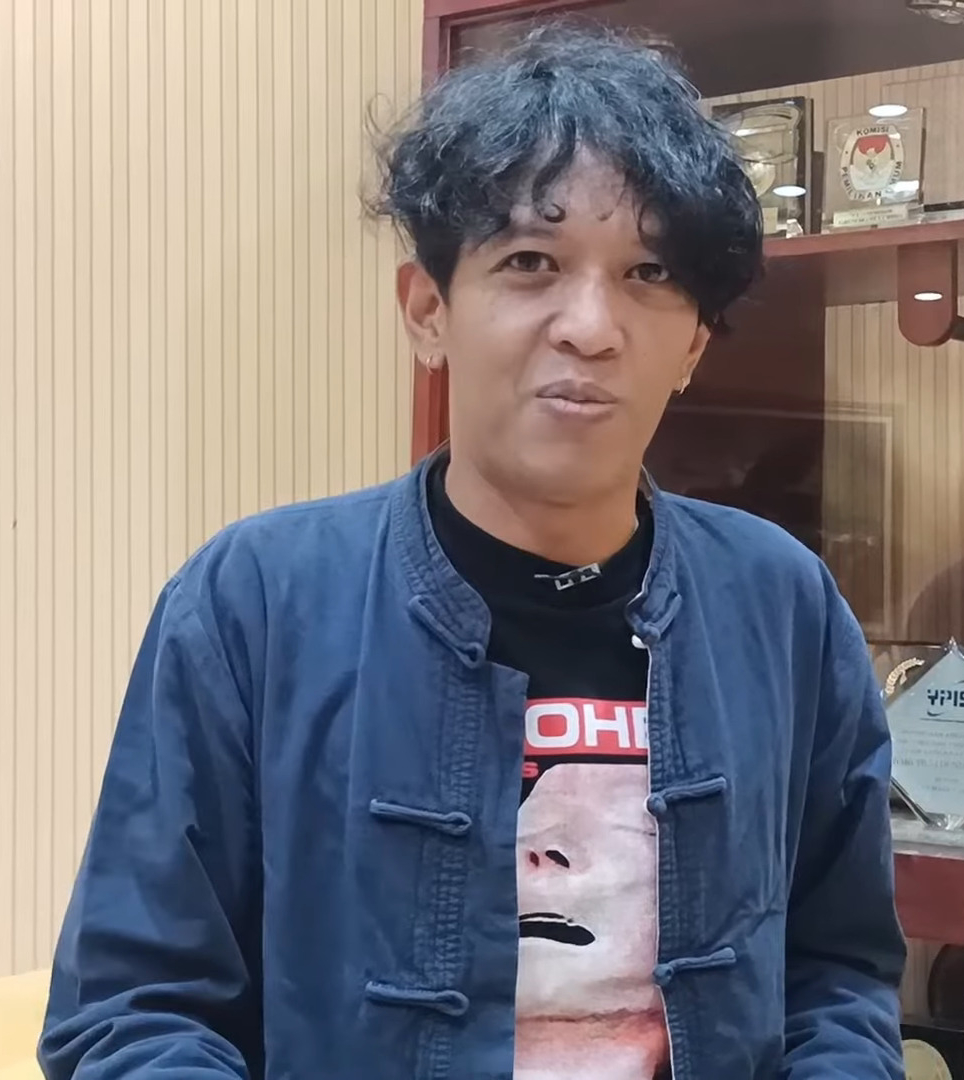
- Oomleo on Ngobras in 2023
- Born: Narpati Awangga; Jakarta
- Occupation: Artist
- Known for: Pixel art
- Musical career
- Genres: Electronic
- Years active: 2003–present
- Member of: Goodnight Electric

Narpati Awangga, better known as Oomleo, is an Indonesian pixel artist, electronic musician, and karaoke guide. Oomleo is a member of Indonesian art collective Ruangrupa, the director of Rururadio (Ruang Rupa Radio), and a member of Indonesian band Goodnight Electric. As a karaoke guide, he formed the Oomleo Berkaraoke team and has been called a mass-karaoke pioneer in Indonesia by Indonesian mass media.

== Early life ==
Oomleo was born in Jakarta. Oomleo studied in Indonesia Institute of the Arts Yogyakarta before dropping out and returning to Jakarta in 2002.

== Visual arts ==
As a visual artist, Oomleo works in the field of pixel art. In this field, Oomleo is inspired by the pixel art group, eBoy. Yvonne Spielmann in the Contemporary Indonesian Art: Artists, Art Spaces, and Collectors book described Oomleo's work method as "to alter pictorial components of urban life, like the structures of city maps and traffic, with simple computer software in such a way that they can be presented in animations as iconographic pixel art." Besides pixel art, Oomleo is also interested in three-dimensional art and line art, as part of the process for making pixel artworks.

In 2015, Oomleo held an exhibition titled Angkutan (English: "Transporter") that exclusively exhibited his works. The works exhibited include pixel artworks that were printed on acrylic and animated GIFs. The exhibition was themed around Oomleo's memories, especially the ones about memorable vehicles in his life. Oomleo also held a film-poster exhibition Mé-REKLAMé-KAN PELéM (English: Advertising Film) with other artists in 2016.

=== Ruangrupa ===
After dropping out of college and returning to Jakarta, Oomleo hanged out with a local art collective, Ruangrupa, whose members had already been friends with Oomleo, including the director Ade Darmawan. Because Oomleo had no job, Ade requested Oomleo to help create a computer network for Ruangrupa. By 2003, Oomleo had joined Ruangrupa. Oomleo described his job description at the time as an entertainer and a technician.

In Ruangrupa, Oomleo is the director of Rururadio (Ruang Rupa Radio), a streaming-radio chapter of Ruangrupa that was created in 2010 and published in 2015.

== Music ==
Oomleo's musical background came from his father who was a jazz drummer and had many jazz cassette tape. In high school, Oomleo used to play guitar and bass. While in school and college, Oomleo tried to learn as much as possible about music, including computer software for music such as Fruity Loops. In spite of his career as a musician, Oomleo said in 2020 that he considered his musical activities as a side job compared to his visual arts.

=== Oomleo Berkaraoke ===
Oomleo's interest in karaoke began at the end of 2003. Oomleo said that he wanted to create a karaoke system due to not having the tools needed to sing-along a song. Once he figured out the karaoke format that he wanted, Oomleo held a karaoke in a Ruangrupa party. Oomleo began to guide karaoke in public starting with a showing in the Perc nightclub in Jakarta. Oomleo also tried other karaoke formats such as a karaoke competition in 2005 and including a karaoke in an exhibition. As of 2019, Oomleo Berkaraoke consists of five teams and has other guides besides Oomleo such as Arie Dagienkz, Adit Insomnia, and Ruru Radio Berkaraoke.

=== Goodnight Electric ===
Goodnight Electric is an Indonesian electronic band formed by Henry "Batman" Foundation in 2003. Oomleo's participation in the group began when he gave advice to Batman on software and MIDI. Batman then recorded Goodnight Electric's first album alone and asked Oomleo to mix some parts. After Henry recruited Bondi Goodboy to the band, Oomleo requested to join the band as well.

During Goodnight Electric's early performances, Oomleo merely hit the play button of the CDJ and pretended to play the synthesizer if there was one on stage. After the band had enough money to buy a keyboard, Oomleo studied how to play it using his knowledge of music basics. By the time Goodnight Electric recorded their second album, Oomleo and Bondi had begun to play their own instruments.

=== Others ===
During the early days when he hanged out with Ruangrupa, Oomleo played guitar and wrote songs with some members of the Indonesian band White Shoes & The Couples Company. One of Oomleo's song, "Senja" (English: "Dusk"), was included in the band's 2005 self-titled album. When White Shoes & The Couples Company recorded their second album, Vakansi, Oomleo requested to be allowed to send another song, and his song "Kisah dari Selatan Jakarta" (English: "A Story from South Jakarta") was included.

In January 2020, Oomleo collaborated with Indonesian boyband Smash on the single "Jadi Milikku", which is produced with the composer trio Laleilmanino. Oomleo said that the collaboration began when he met one of Smash's member, Benny. Before the collaboration, Smash and Oomleo collaborated in Synchronize Festival 2019. Oomleo also has often played Smash' song.
