= Mukenge/Schellhammer =

Congolese-German artist duo

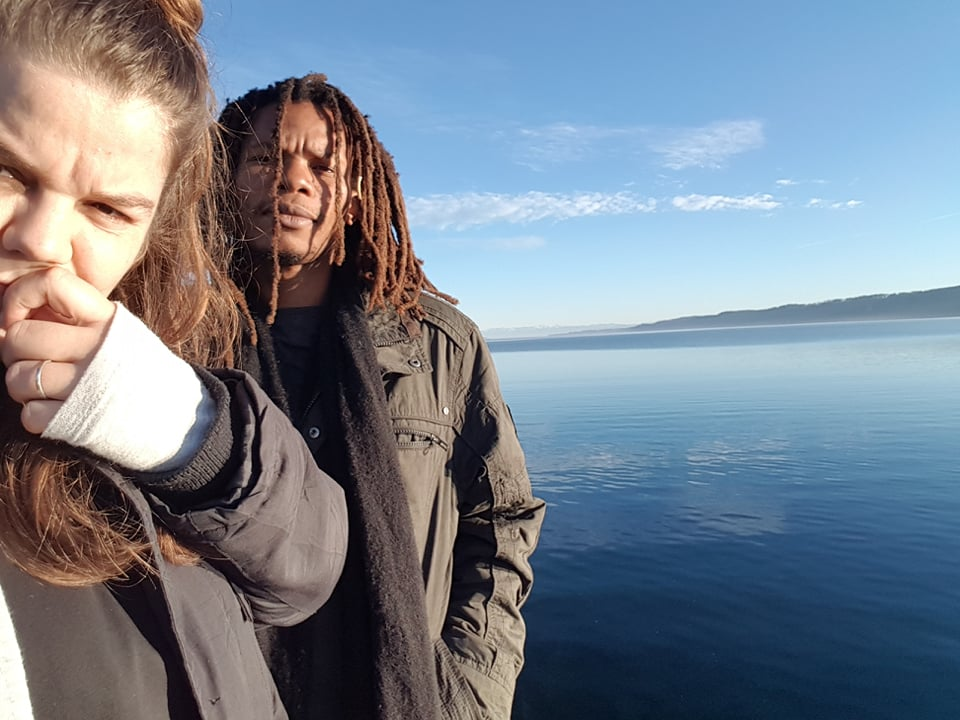
- Christ Mukenge & Lydia Schellhammer, 2022
- Born: Christ Mukenge 1988 (age 37–38) Kinshasa, DRC; Lydia Schellhammer 1992 (age 33–34) Konstanz, Germany
- Education: Christ Mukenge: Institut des Beaux-Arts, Kinshasa (ceramics), Académie des Beaux-Arts de Kinshasa (painting) Lydia Schellhammer: University of Augsburg (art pedagogy), Académie des Beaux-Arts de Kinshasa (painting)
- Known for: Painting, performance, video art, digital art, AR, VR
- Website: mukengeschellhammer.com

Mukenge/Schellhammer is a Congolese–German contemporary artist duo working across painting, performance, video, digital media, including augmented and virtual reality and grounded in a post-digital understanding of painting. Based between Kinshasa and Berlin, their practice combines Congolese and Western painting traditions as well as contemporary popular culture, within a formal approach that treats painting as a site of friction between cultural systems, images and bodies. The duo consists of Christ Mukenge (born 1988 in Kinshasa, Democratic Republic of the Congo) and Lydia Schellhammer (born 1992 in Konstanz, Germany).

== Biography ==
=== Early life and education ===
Christ Mukenge completed his secondary education with a specialisation in ceramics at the Institut des Beaux-Arts in Kinshasa from 2000 to 2006. He studied painting at the Académie des Beaux-Arts de Kinshasa from 2012 to 2017.

Lydia Schellhammer studied extracurricular art pedagogy with a focus on painting at the University of Augsburg from 2013 to 2017 and painting at the Académie des Beaux-Arts de Kinshasa with Prof. Dr Henri Kalama from 2016 to 2017.

The collaboration of Christ Mukenge and Lydia Schellhammer started in 2012 in Kinshasa, although the duo Mukenge/Schellhammer was not officially created until 2016. The two artists started working together at a squat at the Académie des Beaux-Arts of Kinshasa called "Noyaux", later renamed "Carré Magique" (2000–2016). It was the birthplace of Kontempo (Note: Kontempo is a term that emerged as a neologism in Kinshasa's independent art scene. As a counter-narrative to Western-influenced academic discourse, Kontempo has emerged as a new code and reinterpretation of the term "contemporary" in Kinshasa.) which included different artistic movements such as urban performance and Partagisme, (Note: Partagisme defines a movement of radically collective practice in Kinshasa, founded in 2014 by students of the Académie des Beaux-Arts de Kinshasa together with artists. The term derives from the French verb "partager" (to share) and, through the addition of the suffix "-ism", becomes a theory of collective authorship.) which continue to influence Mukenge/Schellhammer's working methods.

The collaboration began as a necessity, working between the Democratic Republic of Congo and Europe, they are confronted with traces of the colonial past, economic inequalities and structural racism and it was this political pressure gave rise to the fusion of the two artists as the duo, Mukenge/Schellhammer.

Mukenge/Schellhammer founded Laboratoire Kontempo, a digital and analogue platform for experimental contemporary art in Kinshasa.

== Artistic Work ==
Working together on the same support and co-signing all works, Mukenge/Schellhammer developed a visual language shaped by the transcultural encounter of the two artists, arising from a culture clash of different artistic traditions and moving beyond categories of nationality, geographical origin and gender. The duo has been defined by the artists as an entity independent of them, with its own formal specificities and aesthetics, shaped by the conditions of the present.

Mukenge/Schellhammer's first solo show was Komplexé at the Institut Français of Kinshasa in 2019. An early work by the duo is the film Your Exoticism is My Daily Bread, which introduces Mukenge/Schellhammer's concept of "strategic auto-exoticisation", while the film has been shown at the Pan-African video festival BodaBoda Lounge titled Now Bite the Hand that Feeds You (2020), the Guggenheim Museum in New York (2021), and Documenta fifteen (2022). The Pool Malebo work series deals with painting in the local context of Kinshasa in relation to international art scenes and the art market. It has been presented at Ifa Galerie Stuttgart (2022), the National Museum of Kinshasa (2021), and Haus der Statistik, Berlin (2022).

Mukenge/Schellhammer's hybrid, multimedia painterly approach is consolidated in the exhibitions Barking Dogs in the Head (Plateforme Contemporaine Kinshasa, 2022) and Undigested Images (Kunststiftung Baden-Württemberg, Galerie Barbara Thumm, 2023). The combination of digital and analogue paintings and the radically collaborative working process lays the foundation for a new aesthetic. As a result, the artists declare the duo to be an entity: "a double-headed monster, shaped and deformed by the pressure of the conditions of our present."

Exploring the medium of painting in the post-digital age, the duo uses virtual and augmented reality techniques, giving rise to an interweaving of painterly, digital and real spaces. This expanded painterly approach has been visible in the group exhibition Between Pixel and Pigment at Marta Herford (2024), Fellbach Triennale (2025), and Rohkunstbau (2025), among others.

For Mukenge/Schellhammer, radical collaboration is a formal approach and this understanding gives rise to transdisciplinary collective projects such as the multilingual publications Kinzonzi and Pool Malebo, or interdisciplinary performances such as Mbok'Elengi at the Yango Biennale in Kinshasa. Since 2019, the duo has also established the Laboratoire Kontempo platform in Kinshasa as a space where artists and theorists can work without the influence of institutional power dynamics.

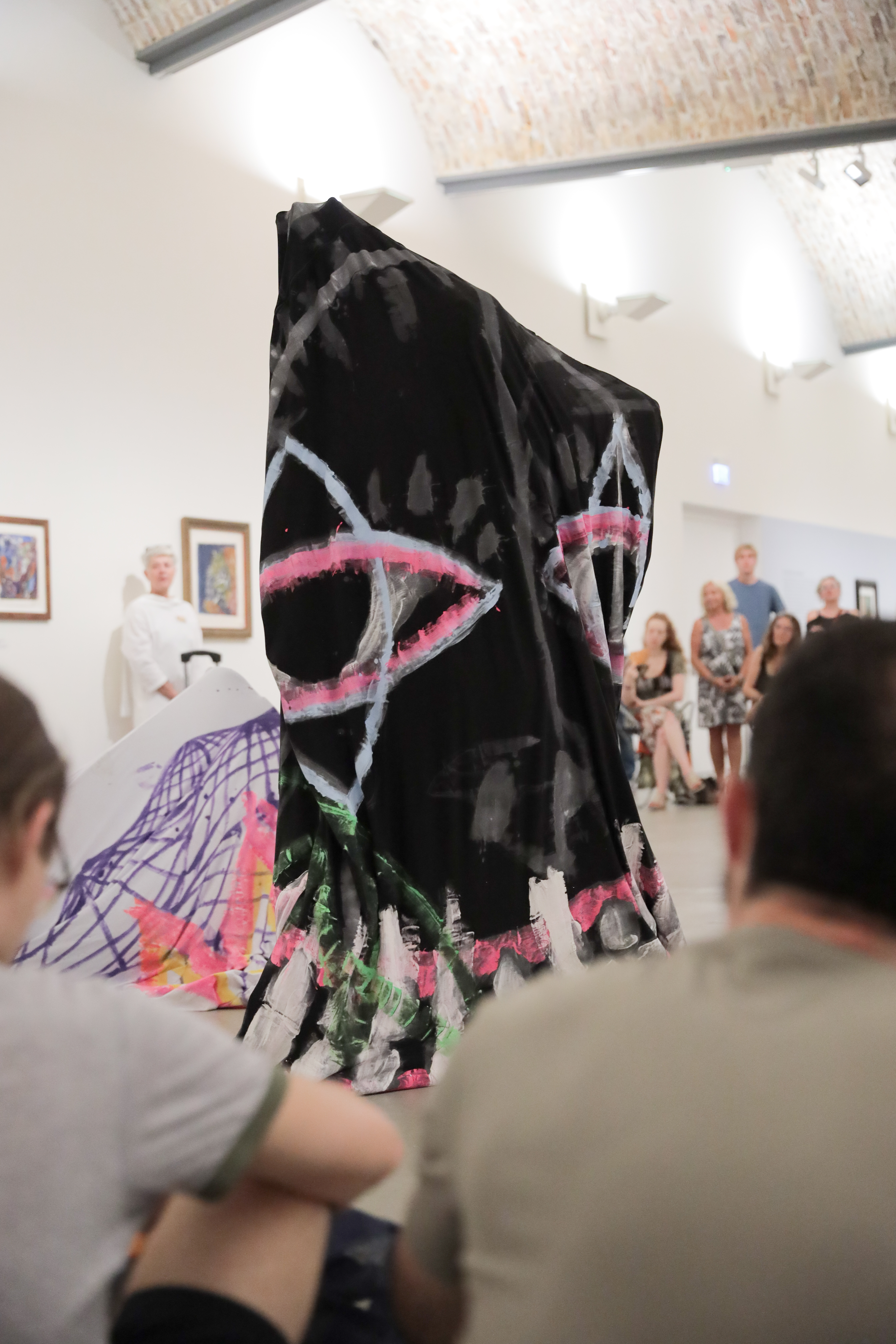
Stretching the Notion of Painting, 2025

Forward Flight, Galerie Barbara Thumm, 2024

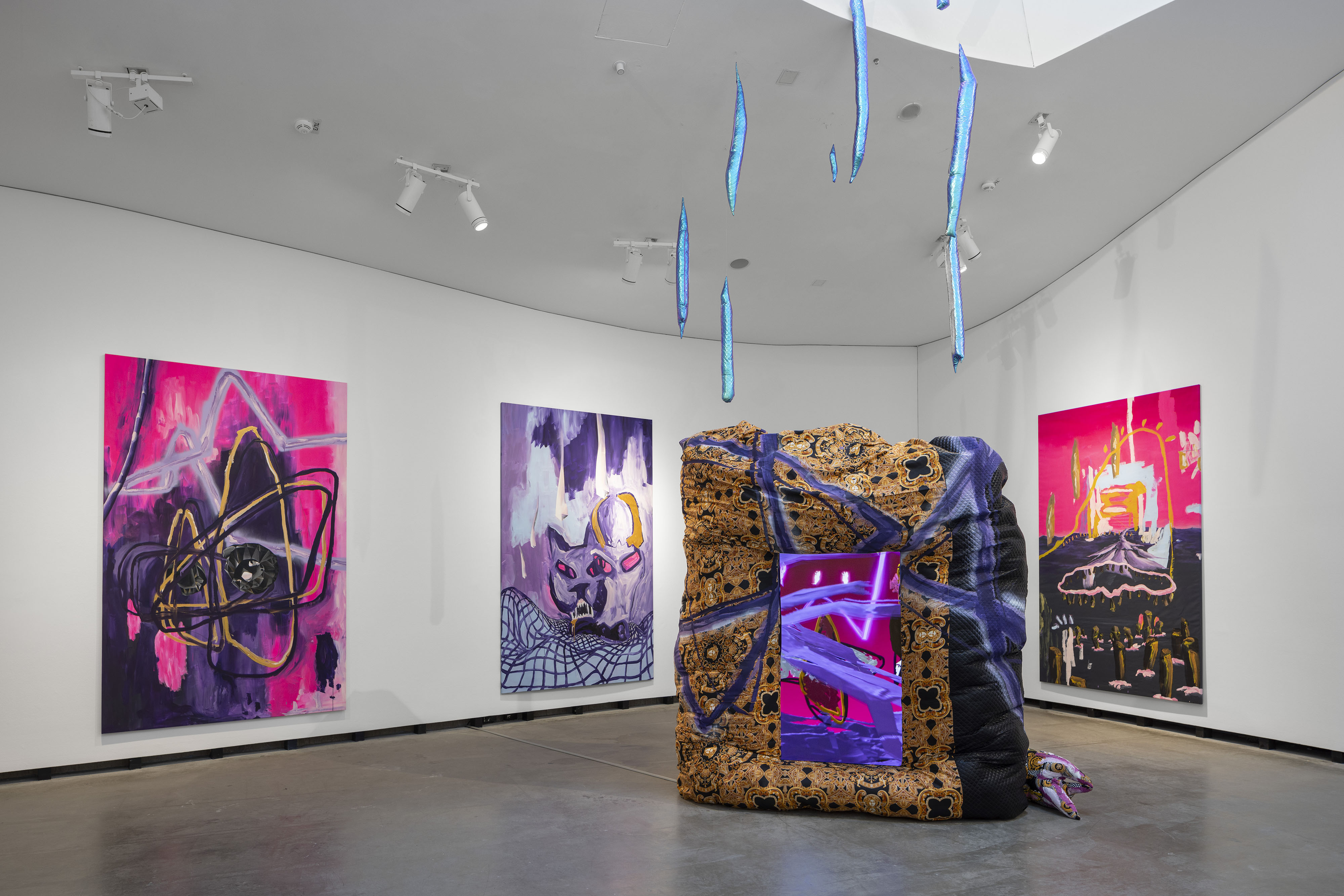
Between Pixel and Pigment, Marta Herford, 2024

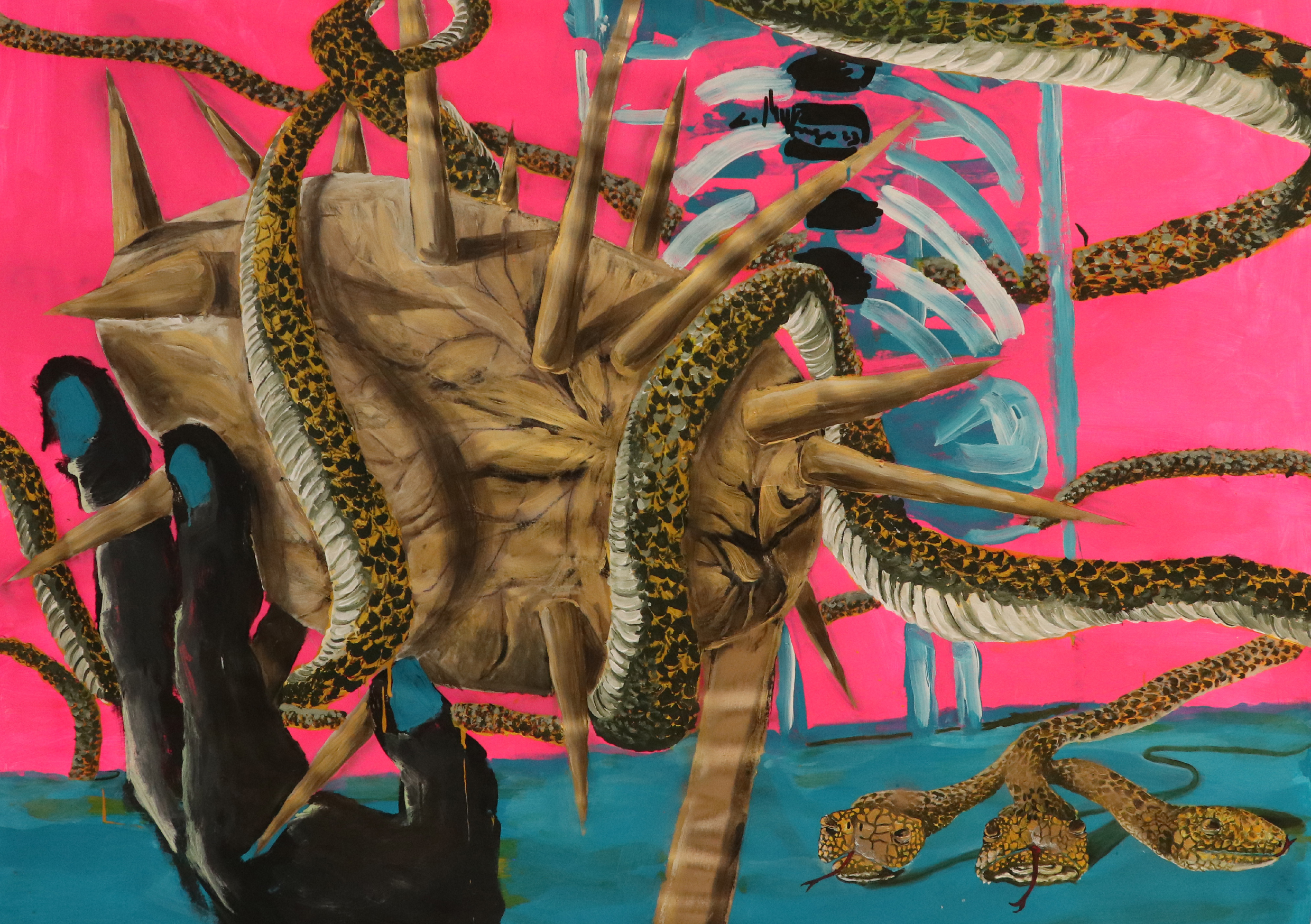
Resting Monsters, 2023

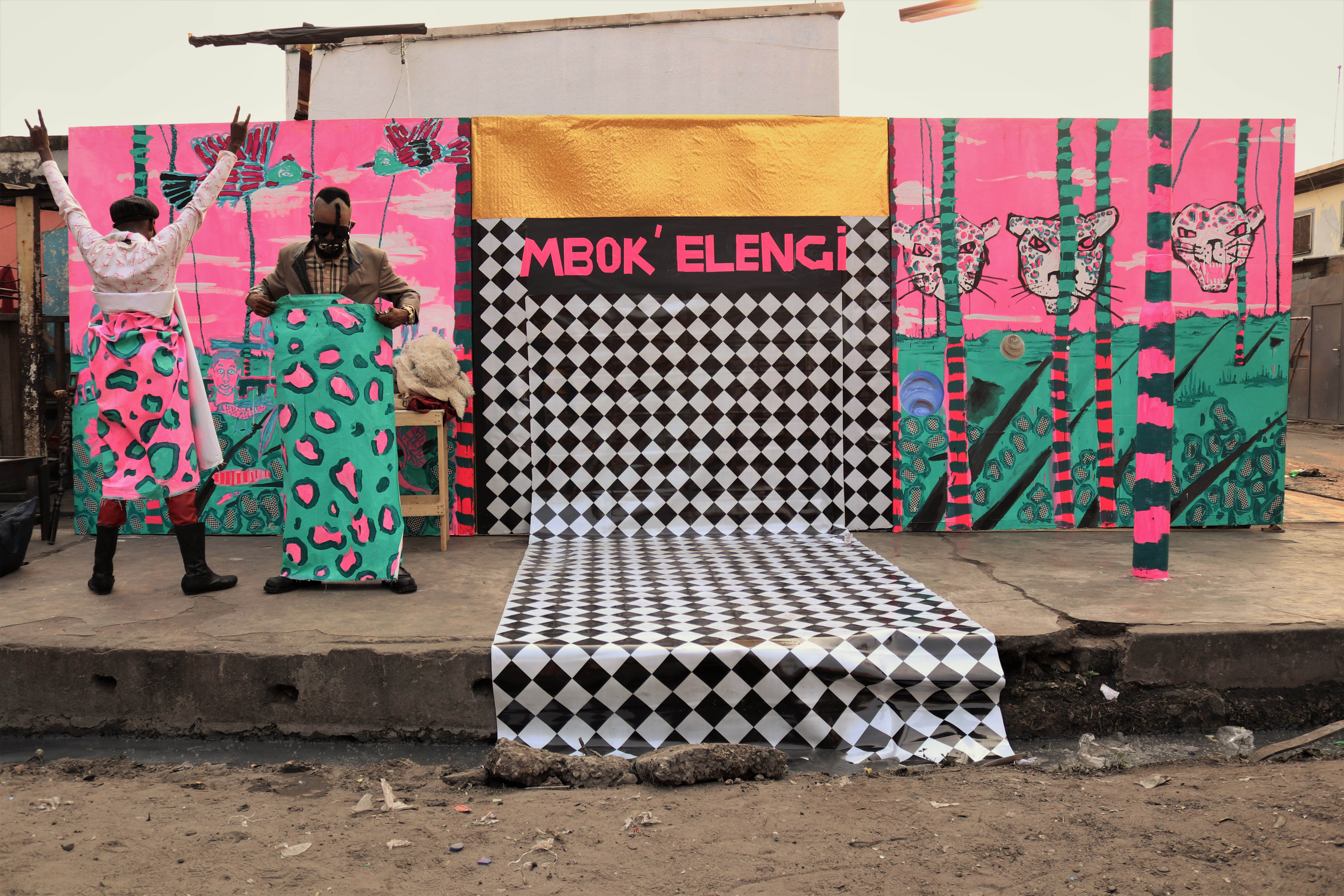
Mbok'Elengi, 2022

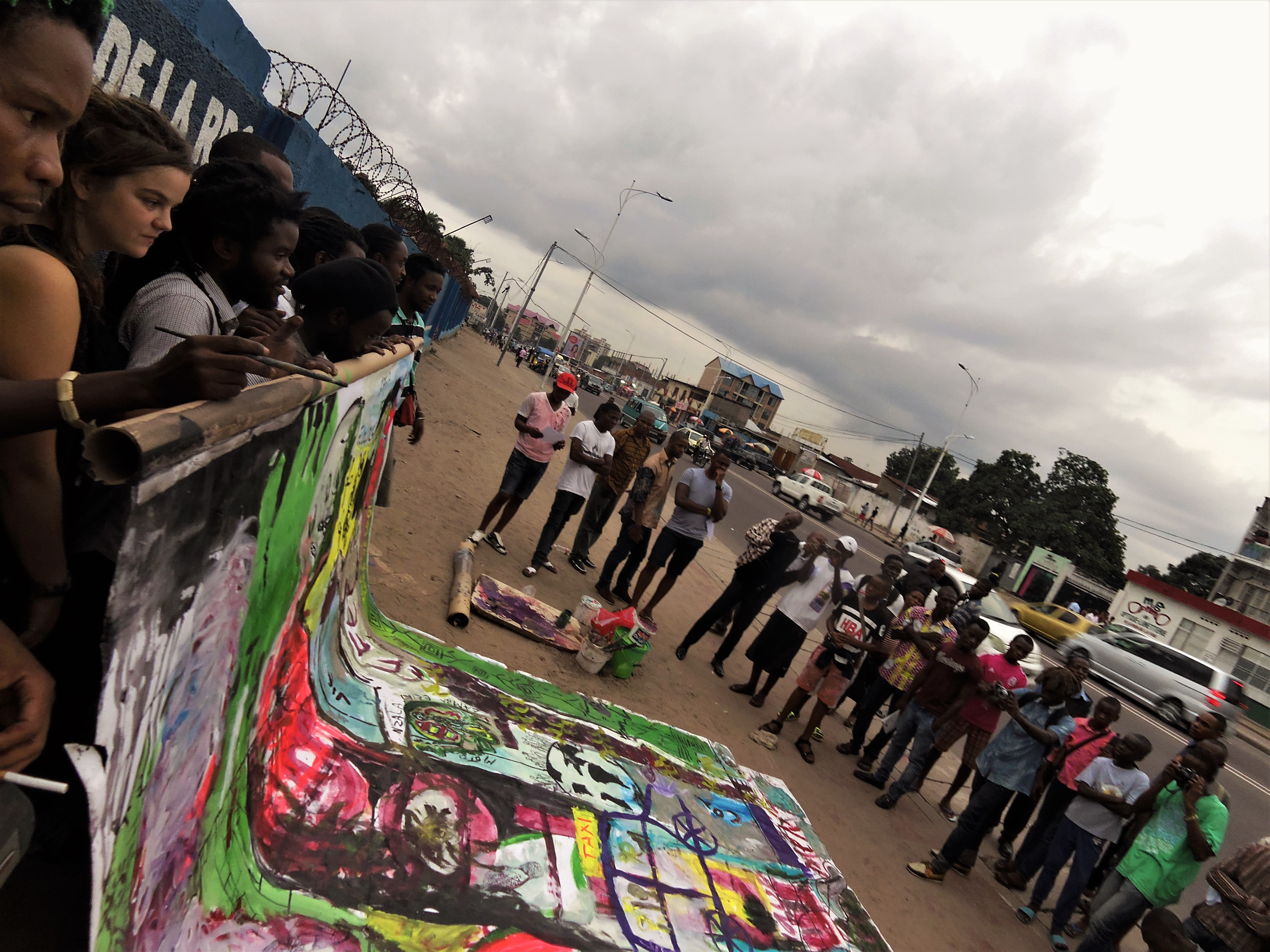
Partagisme, 2016

== Exhibitions ==
=== Solo shows (selected) ===
- 2026: Elima - NoBody (Part I), Musée de l’art Contemporain et de Multimédia, Kinshasa, DRC
- 2026: Elima - NoBody (Part II), Kunsthalle Giesen, Germany
- 2025: Lost in Translation, Frieren Room, Berlin, Germany
- 2024: Forward Flight – Flucht nach vorn, Galerie Barbara Thumm, Berlin, Germany
- 2023: Undigested Images, multimedia exhibition, Galerie Barbara Thumm, Berlin and Kunststiftung Baden-Württemberg, Stuttgart, Germany
- 2022: Barking Dogs in the Head, multimedia exhibition, Plateforme Contemporaine, Kinshasa, DRC
- 2022: Pool Malebo, ifa Gallery, Stuttgart, Germany
- 2019: Komplexé, Institut Français, Kinshasa, DRC

=== Group shows (selected) ===
- 2025: Aesthetic Rearmament, Rohkunstbau, Schloss Altdöbern, Germany
- 2025: Habitats. (Un)Safe Spaces, Triennale Kleinplastik, Fellbach, Germany
- 2024: Art Basel Miami Beach, Galerie Barbara Thumm, USA
- 2024: Between Pixel and Pigment. Hybrid Painting in Post-Digital Times, Marta Herford and Kunsthalle Bielefeld, Germany
- 2024: Singenkunst, Kunstmuseum Singen, Germany
- 2023: Art Basel Miami Beach, Galerie Barbara Thumm, USA
- 2023: Weaving, Stitching, Painting, Galerie Andréhn-Schiptjenko, Paris, France
- 2023: Plural Perspectives, Soft Power, Berlin, Germany
- 2023: Planetary Skins – The Future of Demonstration, an art series by Sylvia Eckermann and Gerald Nestler, Galerie Elisabeth & Klaus Thoman, Innsbruck, Austria
- 2022: Lumbung Film by Centre d'art Waza, Documenta fifteen, Kassel, Germany
- 2022: Re/Projections: Video, Film and Performance for the Rotunda, Guggenheim Museum, New York, USA, invited by Christian Nyampeta
- 2021: Boda Boda Lounge, cross-continental digital, multimedia and video art festival featuring in over 20 spaces throughout Africa
- 2020: QP, Quartiers-Parcours, Art3Kultur, Augsburg, Germany
- 2019: Freiheit – Grenzenlos frei?, Galerie Noah, Germany
- 2017: Erniedrigung ist nicht das Ende der Welt by Gintersdorfer/Klaßen, Skulptur Projekte Münster, Germany

=== Performances (selected) ===
- 2025: Stretching the Notion of Painting, Kunstmuseum Ravensburg, Germany
- 2025: Memory, Speak!, Akademie der Künste, Berlin, Germany
- 2025: Kasala Kontinuum // Ancestors, References, Initiations, Plateforme Contemporaine, Kinshasa, DRC
- 2024: Nager dans l'opulence, Galerie Andréhn-Schiptjenko, Paris, France
- 2023: Intégration, Académie des Beaux-Arts de Kinshasa, Symposium Formes, lettres, identités?, Kinshasa, DRC
- 2017: Dialog direkt Kinshasa – Berlin by Gintersdorfer/Klaßen, Double Vision, Kinshasa, DRC
- 2016: Mbongwana, exhibition and performance, Grand-Hotel Cosmopolis, Augsburg, Germany

=== Projects by Laboratoire Kontempo ===
- 2025: Le Partage du Travail Sensible: Landscape, group show curated by Dereck Marouço Sant'Anna da Silva, Mokili Na Poche, Kinshasa, DRC
- 2025: Kokende Liboso Eza Kokoma Te, group show curated by Dzekashu MacViban, Mokili Na Poche, Académie des Beaux-Arts de Kinshasa, Institut Français, Kinshasa, DRC
- 2022: Kinzonzi, collaborative multimedia exhibition, Haus der Statistik and Acud Galerie, Berlin, Germany
- 2022: Kinzonzi 2.0, exhibition, talks and exchange, online
- 2021: Kinzonzi, collaborative multimedia exhibition, National Museum of Kinshasa, DRC
- 2020: Laboratoire Kontempo 2020, a dialogue between visual art, critical theory and everyday life, virtual exhibition, Kinshasa, DRC
- 2019: Laboratoire Kontempo, a dialogue between visual art, critical theory and everyday life, Plateforme Contemporain/Aw'art/DoubleVision, Kinshasa Bandal, DRC

=== Curated shows (selected) ===
- 2022: Fiction is Never Innocent, online space "New Viewings" by Galerie Barbara Thumm, Berlin, Germany
- 2021: Fiction Might Be Speculative and Inspire Particular Developments, ArtClub Augsburg, Germany
- 2020: Popular Images, Congolese Perspectives, Urban Scenes and Global Networks, Erlangen International Comic-Salon, Germany
- 2016: Ateliers Ouverts, Urbain Museum Lingwala, Goethe Institut Kinshasa, DRC

=== Scenography (selected) ===
- 2025: Cité d'Or, by La Fleur, Theater Rampe and Staatsoper Stuttgart, Germany
- 2025: Josephine Baker, by Monika Gintersdorfer and La Fleur, Theater Freiburg, Germany
- 2021: Sturmtief O'Hara, La Fleur collectiv, Theater Oberhausen, Germany
- 2020: Nana kriegt keine Pocken, by La Fleur, Theater Bremen, Germany and La Commune, Paris, France
- 2019: Nana ou est-ce que tu connais le baras, MC93 Paris, Theater Bremen, Theater Rampe, Stuttgart, Germany
- 2017: Dialog Direkt Kinshasa-Berlin, Gintersdorfer/Klaßen, HAU 2, Berlin, Germany

=== Artworks in public space ===
- 2024: Hommage Skelly aka the Rare Bird, the Son of the Wind, the Machete, the Son of Abla Pokou and the Virgin Mary, interactive mural project, Bouaké, Côte d'Ivoire
- 2023: Gestural Living, multifunctional paintings, Brechtfestival, Augsburg, Germany
- 2022: Mbok'Elengi, Mukenge/Schellhammer feat. Pigeon de la Terre and Beauté Sauvage, painting, Yango Biennale de Kinshasa, DRC
- 2018: Urban Museum, Kinshasa, supported by Swiss Embassy Kinshasa and Goethe Institut, DRC
- 2016: Yaka Totala, Urbain Museum Kinshasa, supported by Goethe Institut Kinshasa, DRC

=== Articles and publications (selected) ===
- 2025: Between Pixel and Pigment: Painting in the Postdigital Present, ISBN 978-3-496-01714-1
- 2023: Pool Malebo, exhibition catalogue, ifa Galerie Stuttgart, Germany
- 2023: Laboratoire Kontempo Kinzonzi, exhibition catalogue, Laboratoire Kontempo, Kinshasa, DRC and ACUD Macht Neu, Berlin, Germany
- 2023: "Shattering the Structure", interview with Christ Mukenge, Lydia Schellhammer and Sorana Munsya, e-flux
- 2022: "Laboratoire Kontempo Embraces the Art of Conflict", interview by Enos Nyamor, Contemporary And C&
- 2022: "Das Potential von Fremdheit", by Agata Hofrichter, Missy Magazine

=== Talks and lectures (selected) ===
- 2024: Lost in Translation, artist talk, Miss Read Berlin, Germany
- 2024: Artist talk, Utopies Urbaines, MingiWingi, Académie des Beaux-Arts de Kinshasa, DRC
- 2022: Dinnertime Talk, DHBW Ravensburg, Germany
- 2020: Spam 3, a radio program of undesired-desired messages, ACUD macht neu, Berlin, Germany

=== Residencies and grants (selected) ===
- 2024: Brandenburg work package fellowship
- 2023: Fellowship of the Baden-Württemberg Art Foundation
- 2023: Rostock fellowship
- 2021–2022: Fellowship Visual Art and Media Practice Field, Akademie Schloss Solitude
