= Arts Collaboratory =

- Founded: 2007
- Founder: Hivos, DOEN Foundation in collaboration with Mondriaan Foundation
- Purpose: Visual arts and social innovation
- Location: The Hague
- Method: Grants, funding, artistic exchanges
- Website: www.artscollaboratory.org

Arts Collaboratory is a program promoted by Hivos and DOEN Foundation to support independent visual arts organizations in Africa, Asia and Latin America and social innovation. The program is having a major role in providing fundings for contemporary art and practices in countries where few resources in this field are available.

== History ==
The program was established in 2007 by the Dutch organizations Hivos and DOEN Foundation and it is implemented in collaboration with Mondriaan Foundation.

== Activities ==
The program provides funding and it supports knowledge sharing and artistic exchange. The fundings are

- Long term support for independent visual arts organizations focusing on collaborative art practices and social innovation. The supports addresses independent visual organizations based in Africa, Asia and Latin America and it is provided for a 28 month-programme.
- Project Fund for ‘Visual Arts and Social Innovation’ (up to 15'000 euro per project).

Partner	Country	Project	Period	References	Note
Ugandan Arts Trust	Uganda	Artistic Exchange David Bade and 32º East	open		
African Artists' Foundation	Nigeria	LagosPhoto Festival	open		
ArtBakery	Cameroon	Present Perfect!	open		
ArtEast	Kyrgyzstan	Art East Summer School, Boom Boom	open		
Ateliers Sahm	Congo		open		
Britto Arts Trust	Bangladesh	Britto 4th International Artists' Workshop, Britto International Artists' Workshop 2013, Britto New Media Festival 2009	open		
Casa Tres Patios	Colombia	Residency Programme in Medellín	open		
CCA Lagos - Centre for Contemporary Art Lagos	Nigeria	On Independence and the Ambivalence of Promise	open		
CEIA	Brazil	Conversations, Drawing Revisited, MIP2 – Manifestaçao Internacional de Performance, Permeabilities	open		
Centre Soleil d'Afrique	Mali	Festival Africain d’Images Virtuelles Artistiques (FAIVA), Kevin Dalton Johnson’s Art Residency at Centre Soleil d’Afrique	open		
Coeur d’Artistes	Congo		open		
doual'art	Cameroon	doual'art - SUD 2010, Le Jardin Sonore de Bonamouti	open		
Enough Room For Space	The Netherlands	Present Perfect!	open		
First Floor Gallery Harare	Zimbabwe		open		
Hotel MariaKapel	The Netharldans	Elopement: A lovable exchange between The Netherlands and Cameroon	open		
Invisible Borders	Nigeria		open		
Kër Thiossane	Senegal	Afropixel #3	open		
KHOJ International Artists Association	India	Empire Project, Ghoomakkad Toli – A Community Theatre Project at Khirkee Village, Khoj International Residency Programme, Khoj's Satpula Super Series II, Reconciling Ecologies in the Millenium City, The Khoj Marathon by Hans Ulrich Obrist: A Series of Public Conversations	open		
KIOSKO	Bolivia	"Salta Charcos", Artists residencies in Santa Cruz de la Sierra, Curator-in-Residence Programme at KIOSKO, Make a Forest	open		
L'Artocarpe	Guadeloupe		open		
Les Palettes du Kamer	Cameroon	RAVY international festival of visual arts	open		
Lugar a Dudas	Colombia	Sala de Estar, Sala de Estar: Workshop with Juan Mejía	open		
Made in Mirrors Foundation	The Netherlands, Brazil, China, Egypt		open		
Makan	Jordan		open		
Making Snowballs	The Netherlands		open		
Más Arte Más Acción	Colombia	Chocó Base, Nuevatopia	open		
MAVA	Benin		open		
Mohile Parikh Center for Visual Arts (MPCVA)	India	Traversing Precincts in Art	open		
NIMk, Nederlands Instituut voor Mediakunst	The Netherlands		open		
Nubuke Foundation	Ghana		open		
PICHA ASBL	Democratic Republic of Congo	Rencontres Picha, Biennale de Lubumbashi 2013 – Andrea Stultiens, Rencontres Picha, Biennale de Lubumbashi 2013 – Lard Buurman	open		
Raw Material Company	Senegal		open		
ruangrupa	Indonesia	A Joburger in Jakarta: notes on Ruangrupa and the Art of the Network, Ok.Video Comedy, ruangrupa and the shared history between Indonesia and the Netherlands	open		
Sàn Art	Vietnam		open		
SMBA	The Netherlands	Focus on doual'art	open		
Taleb Cherche Midi	Morocco	Arab Media Lab, Digital Marrakech	open		
Taller Multinacional	Mexico	Circulo de Ocio, Viernes Social	open		
The One Minutes Africa	The Netherlands, Egypt		open		
Theertha	Sri Lanka	A Land Where Thousands of Eyes and Minds are Pleased, Mapping Broken Hands and Goodwill Hardware, Sethusamudurum Art Project, Sethusamudurum Art Project - Work in Progress	open		
Time_Frame	The Netherlands		open		
Townhouse Gallery	Egypt	Speak, Memory; Townhouse Independent Study Program	open		
Triangle Arts Trust	International	International Art Residencies at Batiscafo, Knowledge and Skills Sharing Residency Programme	open		
Vasl Artists/Collective	Pakistan	Vasl International Artists' Workshop, Vasl International Artists' Workshop, 2012	open		
Very Real Time	South Africa	Going inside time	open		
Artellewa	Egypt	Artellewa Artist-in-Residence Programme, STOP: Artist Residency at Artellewa	closed		
Bat Centre	South Africa		closed		
Cascoland	The Netherlands	ArtEast and Cascoland, 'the real Kyrgyzstan artists', Dye Fixing	closed		
CCAEA	Kenya	Amnesia, NomadicMILK	closed		
Centraal Museum Utrecht	The Netherlands		closed		
el despacho	Mexico	'Breakfast, Lunch and Dinner'	closed		
Espira / La Espora	Nicaragua	TACON at Espira/La Espora, Themes and contents of pedagogical art practice	closed		
Greatmore Studies	South Africa	Visiting Artists' Residency at Greatmore	closed		
IVAA	Indonesia	The Archive Development Series Programme	closed		
Kuona Trust	Kenya	15 Years Legacy of Kuona Trust, Urban Wasanii International Artist's Workshop 2008	closed		
LOT - La Otra Orilla	Peru	Jan Fabre inspires Peruvian theatre company LOT, LOT project about sustainable landscape development in Peru	closed		
MOCA	United States		closed		
MUA	Honduras	Moving the Map	closed		
Museo Blanes/Harto espacio	Uruguay		closed		
n.e.w.s.	The Netherlands		closed		
P.A.P.A., Participating Artists Press Agency	The Netherlands	P.A.P.A. Labs	closed		
PULSE	South Africa		closed		
Showroom Mama	The Netherlands	Project(OR) Art Fair	closed		
TEOR/éTica	Costa Rica		closed		
Troca-Trocas	Brazil		closed		

== See also ==
- Hivos
- DOEN Foundation
- Prince Claus Fund

== Bibliography ==
- Jos Schuring, Artscollaboratory, programme by Hivos, DOEN and Mondriaan Stichting in "The Power of Culture", June 2007.
- Arts Collaboratory: Best Practice Presentation, res artis, Amsterdam, 2008.
