= DOEN Foundation =

Dutch foundation supporting culture

Stichting DOEN
- Purpose: To support a green, socially inclusive and creative society
- Location: Amsterdam
- Region served: The Netherlands, worldwide programs
- Method: Grants, funding, lans, campaigns
- Key people: Carol Gribnau (CEO)
- Revenue: 30 million euro received as a net proceeds of the Dutch Postcode Lottery, BankGiro Lottery and FriendsLottery in 2012
- Website: www.doen.nl

The DOEN Foundation (in Dutch Stichting DOEN, from Dutch doen = to do, to act, take action) is a Dutch foundation supporting initiatives in the field of culture and cohesion and in the field of green and inclusive economy. The focus of the foundation is on sustainable, cultural and social innovation. DOEN receives the net proceeds of the Dutch Postcode Lottery, BankGiro Lottery and FriendsLottery.

== History ==
The DOEN Foundation was established by the Dutch Postcode Lottery in 1991 to pursue the same objectives as the lottery (people and nature) and to complement the lottery's work. In 1998 the foundation starts receiving an annual contribution from the FriendsLottery (former SponorBingo Lottery); and in 2004 it received annual contributions from the BankGiro Lottery. At the beginning of its mandate the foundation supported development cooperation, human rights, nature and the environment; since 2006 its focus also includes social cohesion.

== Activities ==
DOEN Foundation supports pioneers who work hard to establish a greener, more socially-inclusive, and more creative society, in which:

1. the capacity of the planet is the starting point (green);
2. everybody can participate, where people work together and help each other with respect for individual needs and possibilities (socially inclusive);
3. art and culture are at the heart in the belief that society can not do without (creative).

== Bibliography ==
- Directory of non-governmental organisations active in sustainable development: Europe, OECD Publishing, 1996.
- Jos Schuring, DOEN's 15th anniversary in "The Power of Culture", September 2006.* Gertrude Flentge, Microcredit for African art sector: opportunities and threats in "The Power of Culture", June 2008.
- Interview with Nina Tellegen of DOEN Foundation in "aidenvironment journal", issue 4, November 2010, p. 2.
