= Sembungan =

- Location in Central Java and Indonesia Sembungan (Indonesia)
- Coordinates: 7°14′8.5″S 109°54′56.9″E
- Country: Indonesia
- Province: Central Java
- Regency: Wonosobo Regency
- District: Kejajar District
- Elevation: 7,566 ft (2,306 m)

Population (2010)
  - Total: 1,215
- Time zone: UTC+7 (Indonesia Western Standard Time)

Sembungan is a village in Kejajar district, Wonosobo Regency in Central Java province, Indonesia. Its population is 1215.

== Climate ==
Sembungan has a subtropical highland climate (Cwb) with heavy to very heavy rainfall from October to May and moderate to little rainfall from June to September.

Climate data for Sembungan
Month	Jan	Feb	Mar	Apr	May	Jun	Jul	Aug	Sep	Oct	Nov	Dec	Year
Mean daily maximum °C (°F)	18.1 (64.6)	18.5 (65.3)	18.7 (65.7)	18.5 (65.3)	18.6 (65.5)	18.6 (65.5)	18.2 (64.8)	18.0 (64.4)	18.6 (65.5)	18.9 (66.0)	19.2 (66.6)	18.8 (65.8)	18.6 (65.4)
Daily mean °C (°F)	14.1 (57.4)	14.2 (57.6)	14.5 (58.1)	14.5 (58.1)	14.4 (57.9)	14.0 (57.2)	13.3 (55.9)	12.8 (55.0)	13.7 (56.7)	14.3 (57.7)	14.7 (58.5)	14.5 (58.1)	14.1 (57.4)
Mean daily minimum °C (°F)	10.1 (50.2)	10.1 (50.2)	10.4 (50.7)	10.5 (50.9)	10.2 (50.4)	9.4 (48.9)	8.4 (47.1)	7.6 (45.7)	8.8 (47.8)	9.7 (49.5)	10.3 (50.5)	10.2 (50.4)	9.6 (49.4)
Average rainfall mm (inches)	371 (14.6)	428 (16.9)	433 (17.0)	250 (9.8)	154 (6.1)	83 (3.3)	53 (2.1)	35 (1.4)	57 (2.2)	171 (6.7)	232 (9.1)	388 (15.3)	2,655 (104.5)
Source: Climate-Data.org
