= Taring Padi =

Indonesian art movement

Taring Padi is a collective of underground artists in Yogyakarta, Indonesia. The group was formed in 1998 during the general upheaval following the fall of Suharto.

Taring Padi are well known for the production of posters embedded with political and social justice messages, using the cukil (woodcut) technique onto paper or canvas. In addition to their print work, they also create murals, banners, puppetry, sculptures, street theater performances, punk rock and techno music.

== History ==
After the fall of Suharto, Taring Padi occupied an abandoned art school which they used as a residence and workspace for creating art, music and theatre. Following the 2006 Yogyakarta earthquake, Taring Padi moved their base to a studio in Sembungan village, Bantul, Yogyakarta. The group is well known among international art collectors and underground communities such as the Just Seeds Artists Cooperative and has collaborated broadly internationally.

Works by Taring Padi have been shown in many formal and non-formal settings, including the National Gallery of Indonesia in Jakarta and at the 31st Century Museum, Chiang Mai, Thailand. Taring Padi was also included in the group show Sisa: re-use, collaborations and cultural activism from Indonesia at the University of Technology, Sydney gallery.

In 2004 a film about Taring Padi by filmmakers Jamie Nicolai and Charlie Hillsmith,Indonesian Arts, Activism and Rock 'n' Roll, was screened on SBS TV in Australia. A short cut of this film can be seen online. Filmmaker Rohan Langford has made a brief profile of Taring Padi artist Aris Prabawa, who in 2010 held solo shows at the 4A Centre for Contemporary Asian Art and Casula Powerhouse Arts Centre in Sydney.

In 2018 Taring Padi celebrated its 20-year anniversary with a critically-acclaimed retrospective exhibition at the Yogyakarta Institute of Art (ISI).

== Collaboration ==
In May 2010 Taring Padi and networks, together with the victims of Siring Village and surrounds, collaborated to commemorate the 4th anniversary of the Lapindo Mud disaster near Surabaya. They held etching, screenprinting, painting and singing workshop activities culminating with a carnival and a people's stage show on the edge of the dam containing the mud. A film documenting this project can be seen and downloaded at engagemedia.org.

Taring Padi often run workshops at their studio and undertake collaborative projects with communities and national and international art and political groups. In 2010 in Chiang Mai, Thailand (hosted by Empty Space) and 2012 in Yogyakarta, Taring Padi collaborated with Thai and Myanmar artists in the project Under, After and In Between. Under, After and In Between focused on the different circumstances of each country and group and how they can influence the purpose of artistic work. The projects culminated in performances in Chiang Mai, Bangkok, Yogyakarta and Kulon Progo.

Taring Padi published Seni Membongar Tirani (Art Smashing Tyranny) in 2011 in Indonesian and English, which covered 10 years of the collective's work, including art work and academic articles. The book was launched in a number of cities in Indonesia in 2012 and is now available for free download as an e-book.

In 2023 the exhibition Tanah Merdeka presented at Framer Framed in Amsterdam, the Netherlands brought together works by Taring Padi and various collaborators to reflect on the concept of land and its socio-political implications through a cross-cultural network of solidarity. During a one-month residency in Brazil, four members of Taring Padi developed a new work in collaboration with Framer Framed, with Casa do Povo and the Brazilian landless workers movement Movimento dos Trabalhadores Rurais Sem Terra (MST). During the exhibition in Amsterdam these collaborations took form in an extensive public program and newly developed artworks among others Retomar Nossa Terra / Rebut Tanah Kita (2023) and De Levende Erfenis van Koloniaal Geweld / Evolusi Kekerasan Kolonial. In 2024 the exhibition traveled to the Griffith Art Museum in Brisbane, Australia under the title Tanah Tumpah Darah (2024), including new works produced in collaboration with the Indigenous artist collective ProppaNOW.

== 2022 Documenta controversy ==
At documenta fifteen in 2022, Germany's foremost art exhibition, Taring Padi gained notoriety for imagery critics claimed to be anti-Semitic in its billboard painting "People's Justice" (2002), resulting in it being covered up and later removed. The eight-meter high painting was criticized by the state minister of culture Claudia Roth, representatives of Jewish organizations, the Israeli embassy, and others. Among the many figures in the painting a soldier with a pig's face, with the star of David and with the word Mossad on his helmet could be detected. Another figure with animal-like fangs is depicted wearing a suit and tie, sidelocks and a Bowler hat with SS runes.

Taring Padi denied any discrimination of specific parts of the population. According to them, the billboard painting belongs to a campaign against militarism and the violence experienced during the dictatorship in Indonesia. More specifically, it recalls the 1965-66 Indonesian mass killings in which they lost many of their friends. These killings began as an anti-communist purge following a failed coup d'état that made about one million victims. In the center of the painting this is represented by a mass grave. The perpetrators were never called to account. In the painting, drafted as a people's tribunal, they are depicted as dogs, pigs, skeletons and rats on the left side, on the right side are the victims, the simple citizens, farmers and workers.

== See also ==
- Post-Suharto era
- Printmaking
